= List of the Cenozoic life of Colorado =

This list of the Cenozoic life of Colorado contains the various prehistoric life-forms whose fossilized remains have been reported from within the US state of Colorado and are between 66 million and 10,000 years of age.

== A ==
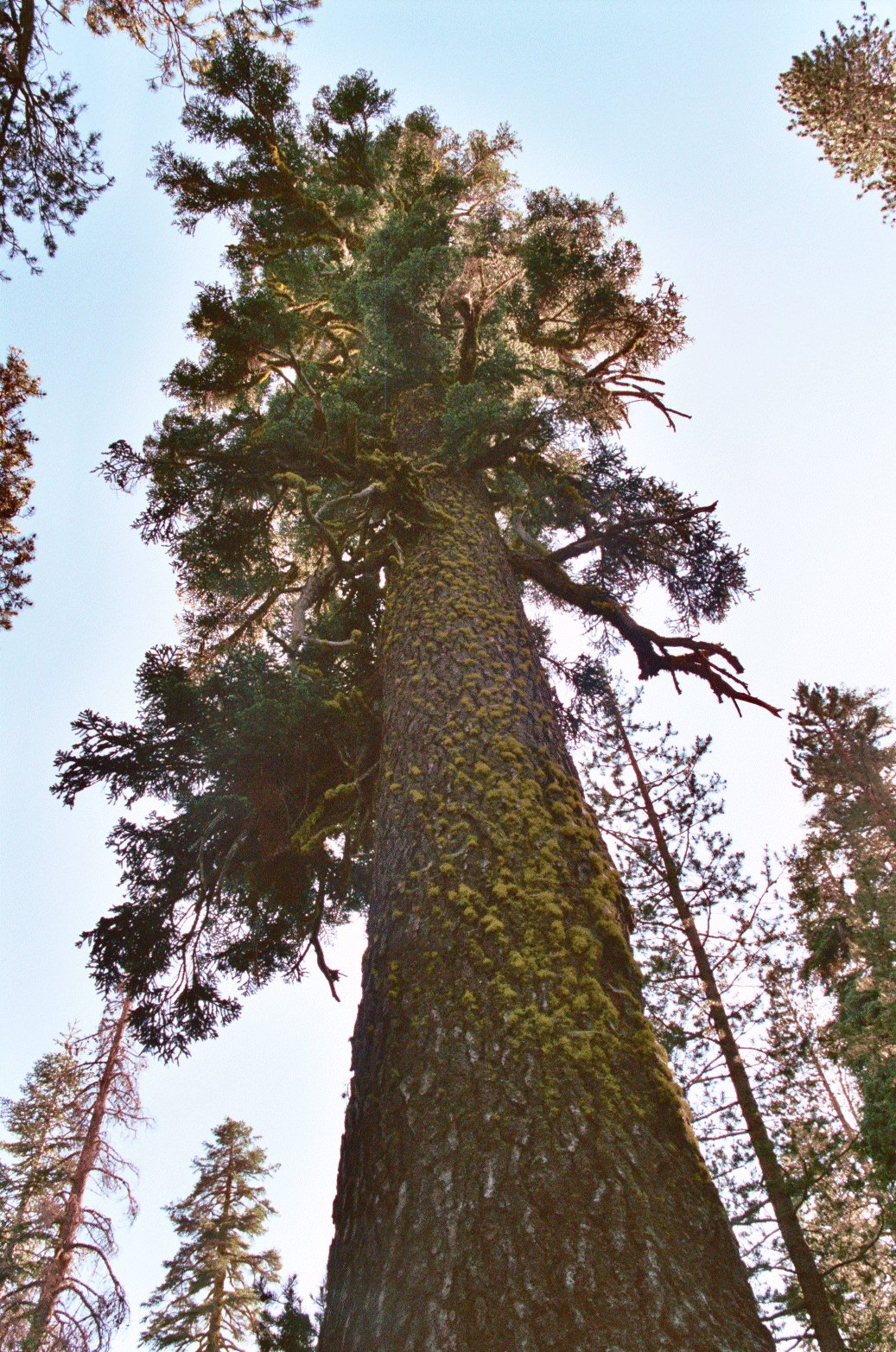
- A living Abies, or fir tree
  Abies
  - †Abies longirostris
- †Absarokius
  - †Absarokius abbotti – or unidentified comparable form
  - †Absarokius metoecus
- †Absyrtus
  - †Absyrtus decrepitus – type locality for species
- †Acaenitus
  - †Acaenitus defunctus – type locality for species
- †Acalles
  - †Acalles exhumatus – type locality for species
- †Acallomyia
  - †Acallomyia probolaea – type locality for species
- †Acalyptus
  - †Acalyptus obtusus – type locality for species
- †Acanthomyites – type locality for genus
  - †Acanthomyites aldrichi – type locality for species
- †Acarictis – or unidentified comparable form
  - †Acarictis ryani
- Acer
  - †Acer florissanti
  - †Acer fragile
  - †Acer macginitiei
  - †Acer oregonianum
- †Achrestocoris – type locality for genus
  - †Achrestocoris cinerarius – type locality for species
- †Acilius
  - †Acilius florissantensis – type locality for species
- †Aciprion – type locality for genus
  - †Aciprion formosum – type locality for species
  - †Aciprion majus – type locality for species
- †Acnemia
  - †Acnemia cyclosoma – type locality for species
- †Acocephalus
  - †Acocephalus callosus – type locality for species
- Acris
- †Acritoparamys
  - †Acritoparamys atwateri
  - †Acritoparamys pattersoni
- Acrostichum
  - †Acrostichum hesperium
- †Acylophorus
  - †Acylophorus immotus – type locality for species
- †Adalia
  - †Adalia subversa – type locality for species
- †Adelocera
  - †Adelocera perantiqua – type locality for species
- †Adelopsyche – type locality for genus
  - †Adelopsyche frustrans – type locality for species
- †Adjidaumo
  - †Adjidaumo minimus
  - †Adjidaumo minutus
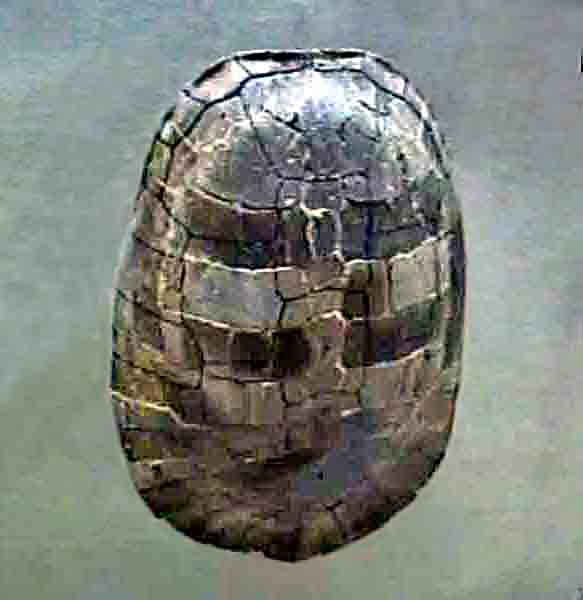
- Fossilized shell of the Early Cretaceous-Oligocene turtle Adocus
  †Adocus
- Aegialia
  - †Aegialia opaca
- †Aelurodon
  - †Aelurodon asthenostylus
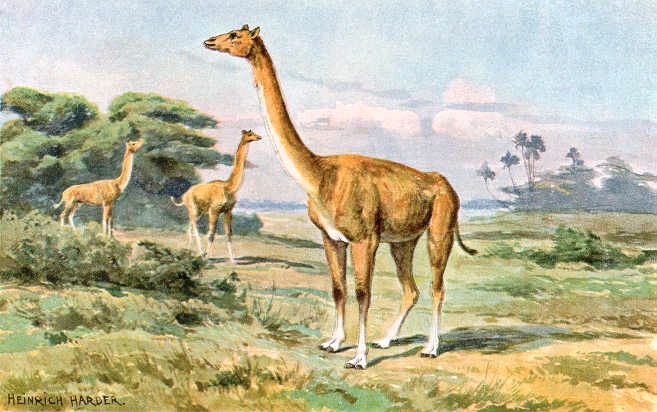
- Life restoration of the Miocene camel Aepycamelus, or the long-necked camel. Heinrich Harder (1920).
  †Aepycamelus
  - †Aepycamelus giraffinus
- Aeshna
  - †Aeshna larvata – type locality for species
  - †Aeshna solida – type locality for species
- Agabus
  - †Agabus charon – type locality for species
  - †Agabus florissantensis – type locality for species
  - †Agabus infuscatus
  - †Agabus rathbuni – type locality for species
- †Agallia
  - †Agallia abstructa – type locality for species
  - †Agallia flaccida – type locality for species
  - †Agallia instabilis – type locality for species
  - †Agallia lewisii – type locality for species
- †Agathemera
  - †Agathemera reclusa – type locality for species
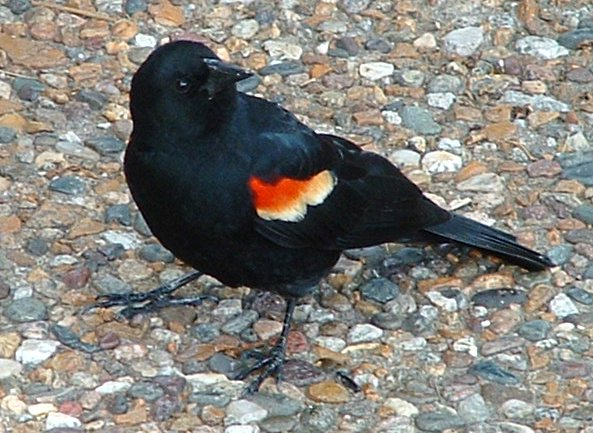
- A living Agelaius
  Agelaius
  - †Agelaius phoenicieus
- †Agenia
  - †Agenia cockerellae – type locality for species
  - †Agenia saxigena – type locality for species
- †Agnotocastor
  - †Agnotocastor coloradensis – type locality for species
- Agoliinus
  - †Agoliinus plutonicus
- Agrilus
  - †Agrilus liragus
  - †Agrilus praepolitus – type locality for species
- †Agrion
  - †Agrion exsularis – type locality for species
  - †Agrion mascescens – type locality for species
  - †Agrion telluris – type locality for species
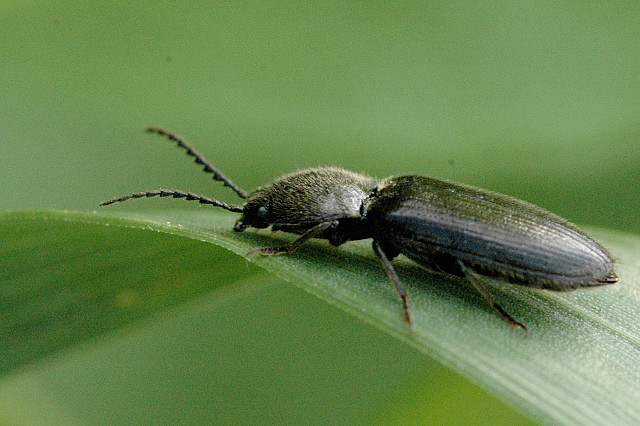
- A living Agriotes click beetle
  Agriotes
  - †Agriotes apicalis
  - †Agriotes comminutus – type locality for species
  - †Agriotes nearcticus – type locality for species
- †Agromyza
  - †Agromyza praecursor – type locality for species
- †Agulla
  - †Agulla protomaculata – type locality for species
- †Agyrtes
  - †Agyrtes primoticus – type locality for species
- †Ailanthus
  - †Ailanthus americana
  - †Ailanthus lesquereuxi
- †Aleocharopsis
  - †Aleocharopsis caseyi – type locality for species
  - †Aleocharopsis secunda – type locality for species
- †Alepidophora – type locality for genus
  - †Alepidophora cockerelli – type locality for species
  - †Alepidophora minor – type locality for species
  - †Alepidophora pealei – type locality for species
- †Aletodon
  - †Aletodon gunnelli – or unidentified comparable form
- Aleurites
  - †Aleurites glandulosa
- †Alforjas – tentative report
- †Alismaphyllites
  - †Alismaphyllites grandifolius
- †Allantodiopsis
  - †Allantodiopsis erosa
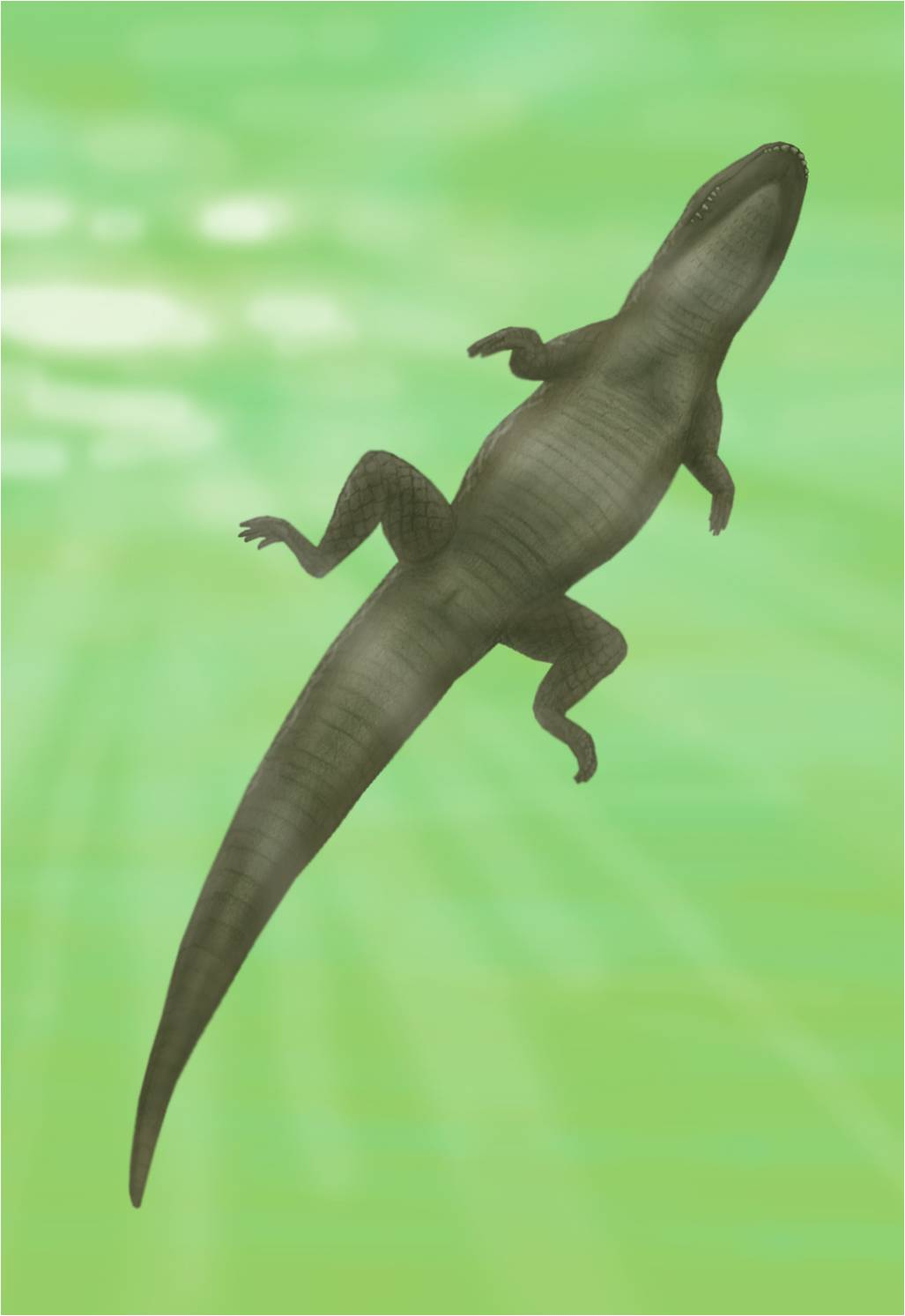
- Life restoration of the crocodilian Allognathosuchus
  †Allognathosuchus
  - †Allognathosuchus polyodon
- †Allophaiomys
  - †Allophaiomys pliocaenicus
- †Allophylus
  - †Allophylus flexifolia
- †Alomatia – type locality for genus
  - †Alomatia fusca – type locality for species
- Altica
  - †Altica renovata – type locality for species
- †Alticonus – type locality for genus
  - †Alticonus gazini – type locality for species
- †Alysia
  - †Alysia exigua – type locality for species
  - †Alysia petrina – type locality for species
  - †Alysia phanerognatha – type locality for species
  - †Alysia ruskii – type locality for species
- Amara
  - †Amara cockerelli – type locality for species
  - †Amara danae – type locality for species
  - †Amara powellii – type locality for species
  - †Amara revocata – type locality for species
  - †Amara sterilis
  - †Amara veterata – type locality for species
- †Amartus
  - †Amartus petrefactus – type locality for species
- †Amauropilio
  - †Amauropilio atavus – type locality for species
  - †Amauropilio lacoei – type locality for species
- †Amblycorypha – tentative report
  - †Amblycorypha perdita – type locality for species
- †Amblyteles
  - †Amblyteles pealei – type locality for species
- †Ambystoma
  - †Ambystoma alamosensis – type locality for species
  - †Ambystoma tigrinum
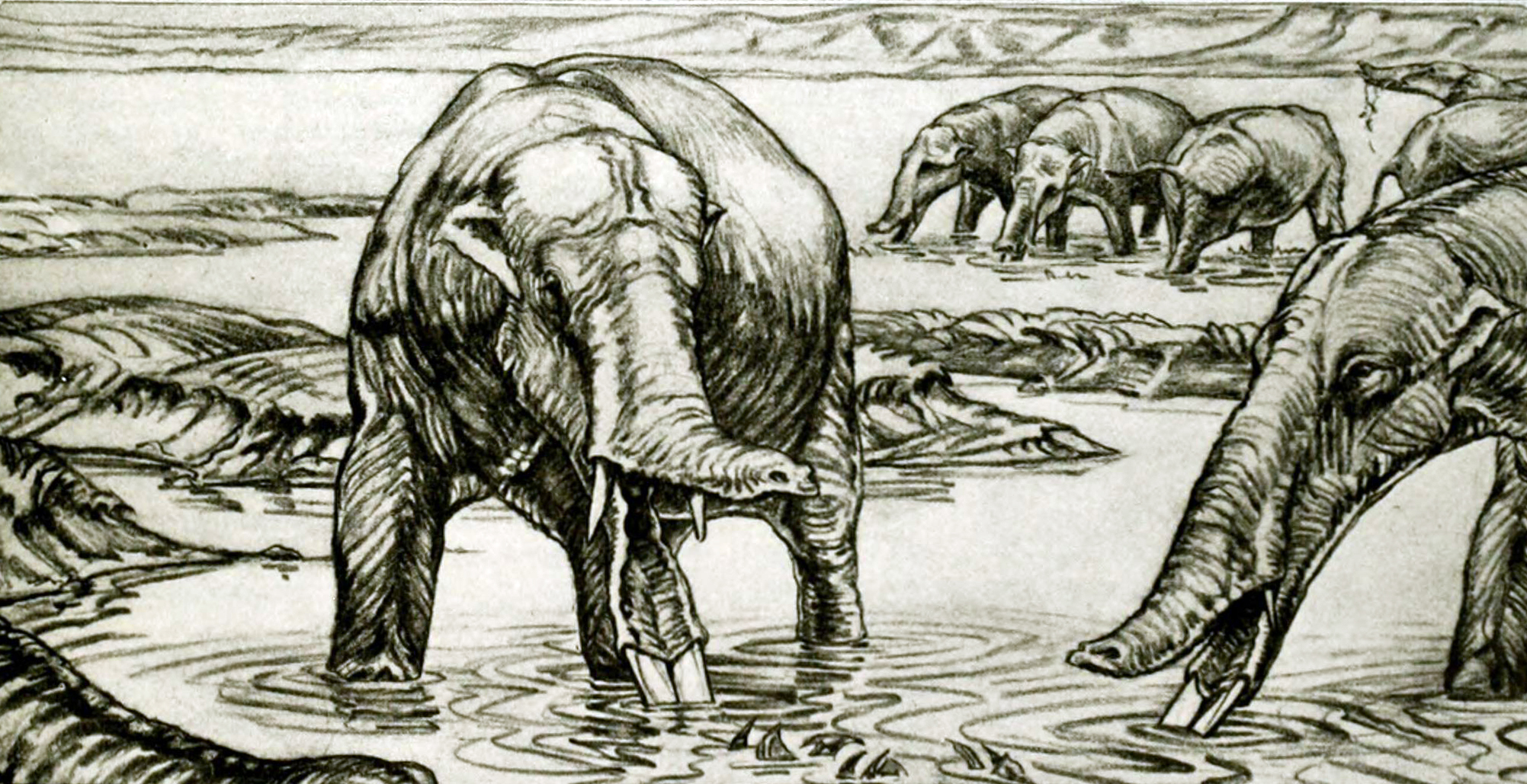
- Life restoration of the Miocene elephant relative Amebelodon. Margret Flinsch (1932).
  †Amebelodon
  - †Amebelodon floridanus
- Amelanchier
  - †Amelanchier peritula
  - †Amelanchier scudderi
- Amia
- †Ammophila
  - †Ammophila antiquella – type locality for species
- †Ampelopsis
  - †Ampelopsis acerifolia
- †Amphechinus
  - †Amphechinus horncloudi
- †Amphicerus
  - †Amphicerus sublaevis
- Amphicosmus
  - †Amphicosmus delicatulus – type locality for species
- †Amphicyon
  - †Amphicyon galushai
  - †Amphicyon ingens
- †Amphicyrta
  - †Amphicyrta inhaesa – type locality for species
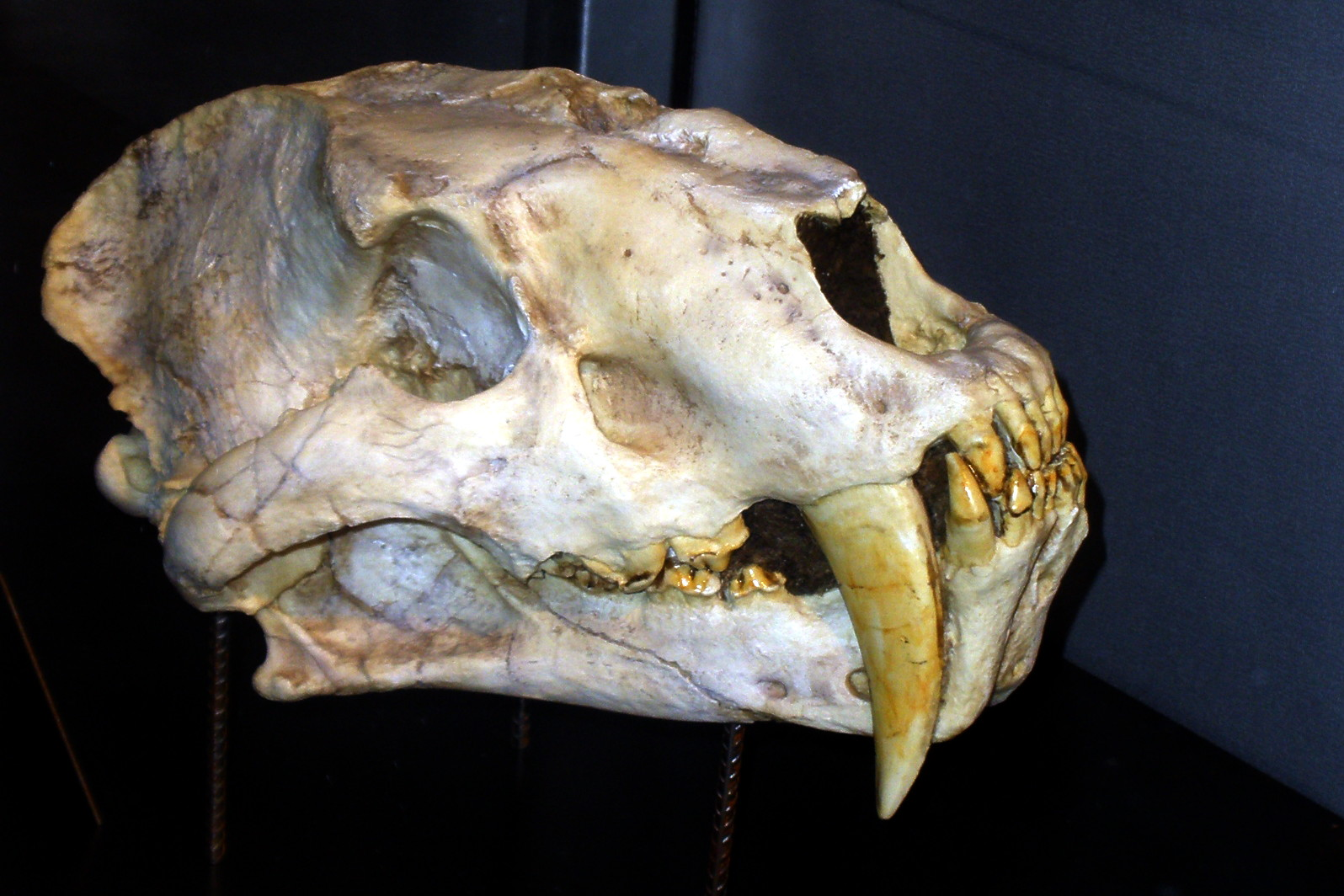
- Fossilized skull of the Miocene saber-toothed cat Amphimachairodus
  †Amphimachairodus
  - †Amphimachairodus coloradensis
- †Ampliconus – type locality for genus
  - †Ampliconus browni – type locality for species
- †Anabrus
  - †Anabrus caudelli – type locality for species
- Anas
- †Anasa
  - †Anasa priscoputida – type locality for species
- †Anatis
  - †Anatis resurgens – type locality for species
- †Anchastus
  - †Anchastus diluvialis – type locality for species
  - †Anchastus eruptus – type locality for species
- †Anchitherium
- †Anconatus – type locality for genus
  - †Anconatus dorsuosus – type locality for species
  - †Anconatus niger – type locality for species
- Andrena
  - †Andrena clavula – type locality for species
  - †Andrena grandipes – type locality for species
  - †Andrena hypolitha – type locality for species
  - †Andrena lagopus
  - †Andrena percontusa – type locality for species
  - †Andrena sepulta – type locality for species
- †Andrenopteryx
  - †Andrenopteryx willardi
- †Andrias
  - †Andrias matthewi
- †Andricus
  - †Andricus myricae – type locality for species
- †Anelaphus
  - †Anelaphus extinctus – type locality for species
- †Anemia
  - †Anemia elongata
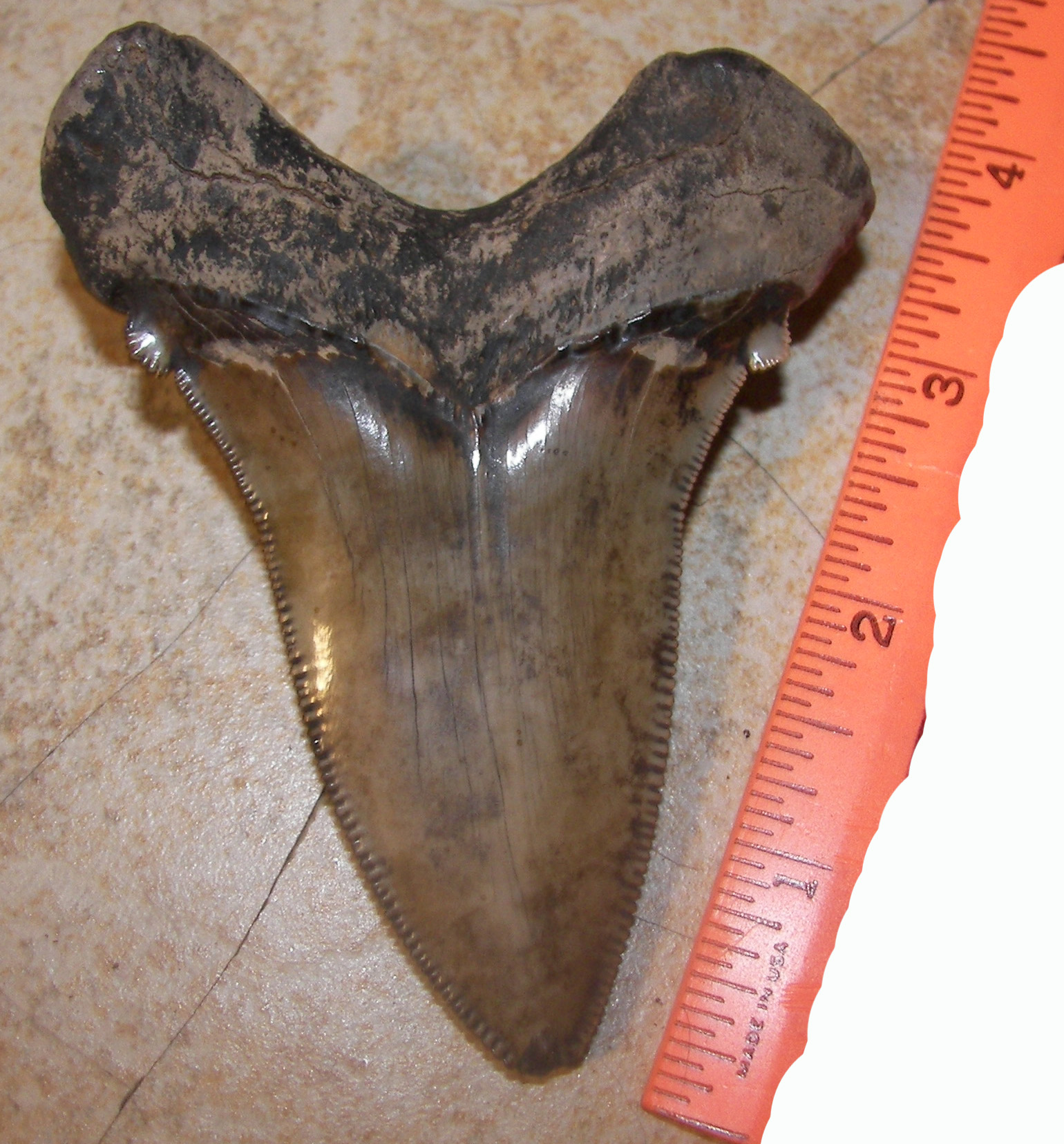
- Fossilized tooth of the Oligocene-Miocene shark Carcharocles angustidens
  †Angustidens
  - †Angustidens vireti
- †Anisonchus
  - †Anisonchus athelas – or unidentified comparable form
- Anisotoma
  - †Anisotoma sibylla – type locality for species
- †Ankylodon
  - †Ankylodon annectens
- †Anobium
  - †Anobium durescens – type locality for species
- †Anomala
  - †Anomala exterranea – type locality for species
  - †Anomala scudderi – type locality for species
- †Anomalon
  - †Anomalon deletum – type locality for species
  - †Anomalon excisum – type locality for species
  - †Anomalon miocenicum – type locality for species
- Anser
- †Antas
  - †Antas crecca
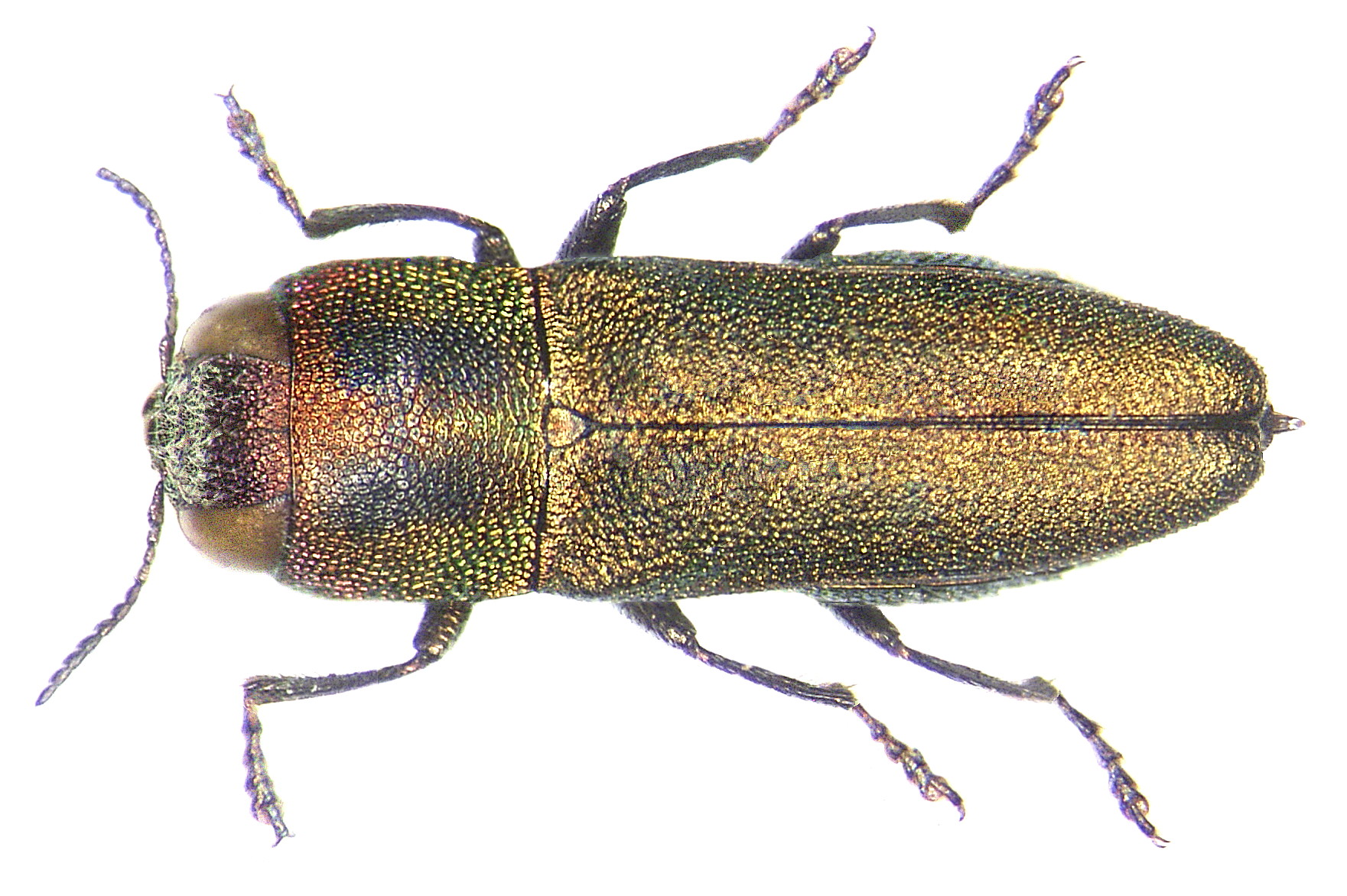
- A living Anthaxia jewel beetle
  Anthaxia
  - †Anthaxia exhumata – type locality for species
  - †Anthaxia prasina
- †Antherophagus
  - †Antherophagus megalops – type locality for species
- †Anthidium
  - †Anthidium exhumatum – type locality for species
  - †Anthidium scudderi – type locality for species
- †Antholithes
  - †Antholithes amoenus
  - †Antholithes pediloides
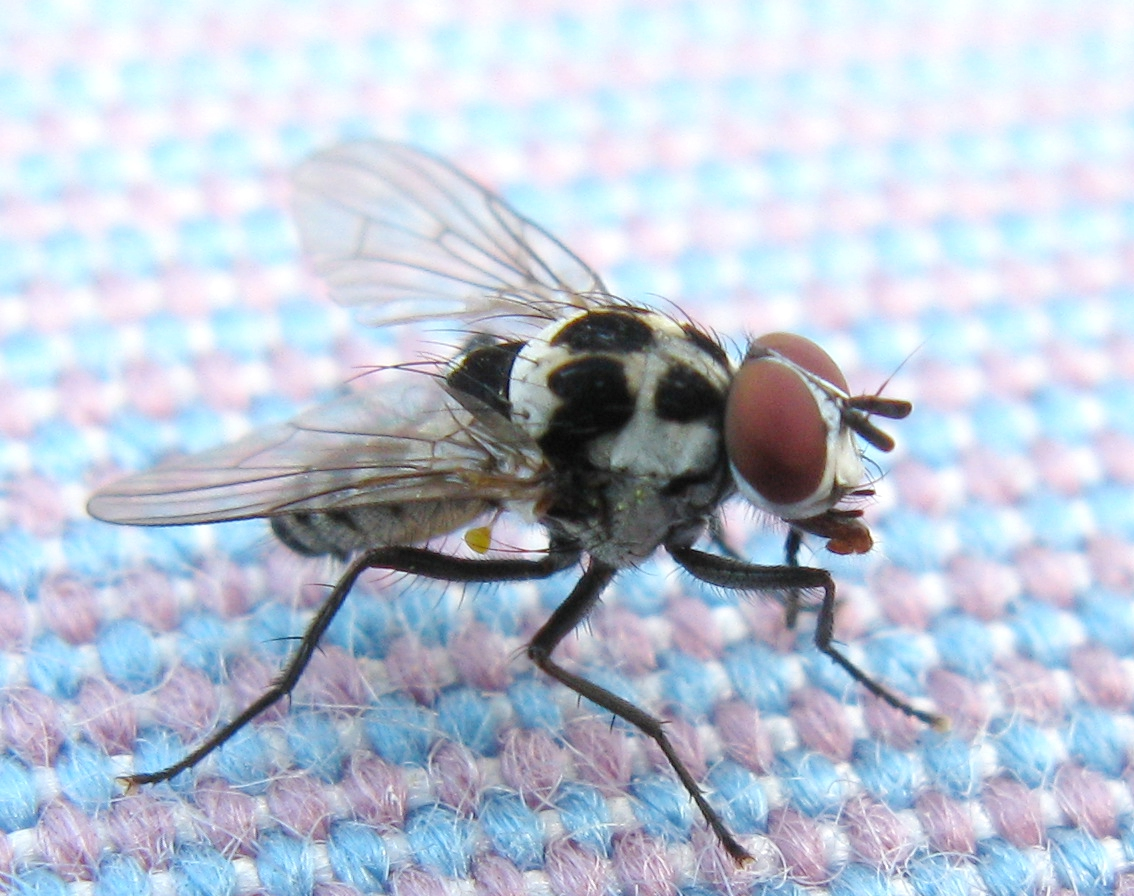
- A living Anthomyia fly
  †Anthomyia
  - †Anthomyia atavella – type locality for species
  - †Anthomyia laminarum – type locality for species
  - †Anthomyia persepulta – type locality for species
  - †Anthomyia winchesteri – type locality for species
- Anthonomus
  - †Anthonomus concussus – type locality for species
  - †Anthonomus debilatus – type locality for species
  - †Anthonomus defossus – type locality for species
  - †Anthonomus evigilatus – type locality for species
  - †Anthonomus primordius – type locality for species
  - †Anthonomus rohweri – type locality for species
  - †Anthonomus soporus
- †Anthophora
  - †Anthophora melfordi – type locality for species
- †Antiacodon
  - †Antiacodon pygmaeus
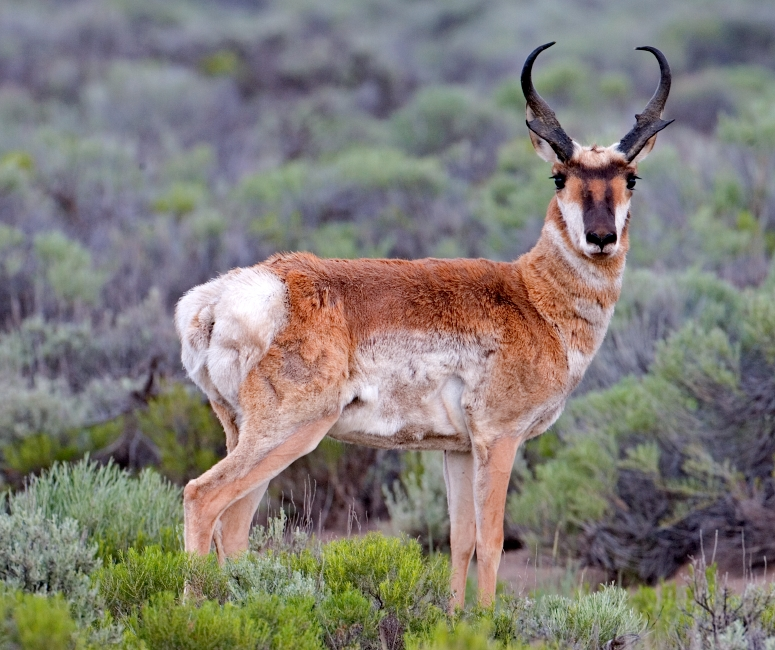
- A living Antilocapra, or pronghorn
  Antilocapra
  - †Antilocapra americana
- †Antocha
  - †Antocha principialis – type locality for species
- †Apanthesis – type locality for genus
  - †Apanthesis leuce – type locality for species
- †Apatosciuravus
  - †Apatosciuravus bifax
- †Aphaena
  - †Aphaena atava – type locality for species
- Aphaenogaster
  - †Aphaenogaster donisthorpei – type locality for species
  - †Aphaenogaster mayri – type locality for species
- †Apheliscus
- †Aphelops
  - †Aphelops malacorhinus
  - †Aphelops megalodus
  - †Aphelops mutilus
- †Aphidopsis
  - †Aphidopsis margarum – type locality for species
- Aphodius
  - †Aphodius aboriginalis – type locality for species
  - †Aphodius florissantensis – type locality for species
  - †Aphodius granarioides – type locality for species
  - †Aphodius inundatus – type locality for species
  - †Aphodius laminicola – type locality for species
  - †Aphodius mediaevus – type locality for species
  - †Aphodius praeemptor – type locality for species
  - †Aphodius senex – type locality for species
  - †Aphodius shoshonis – type locality for species
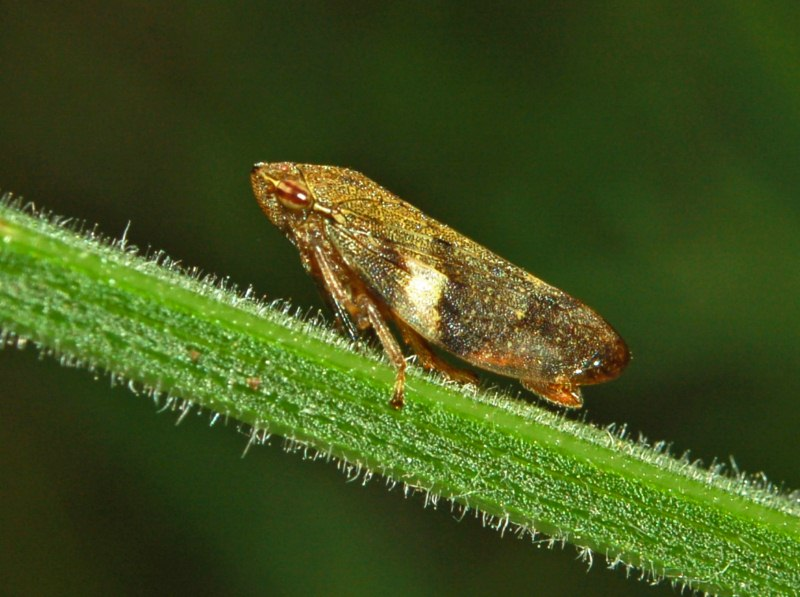
- A living Aphrophora spittlebug
  Aphrophora
- Apion
  - †Apion attenuatum
  - †Apion cockerelli – type locality for species
  - †Apion evestigatum – type locality for species
- †Apocymospermum
- †Apocynophyllum
  - †Apocynophyllum lesquereuxi
- †Apolysis
  - †Apolysis magister – type locality for species
- †Aporema – type locality for genus
  - †Aporema praestrictum – type locality for species
- †Apsilocephala
  - †Apsilocephala vagabunda – type locality for species
- †Apternodus
  - †Apternodus iliffensis
- Aquila
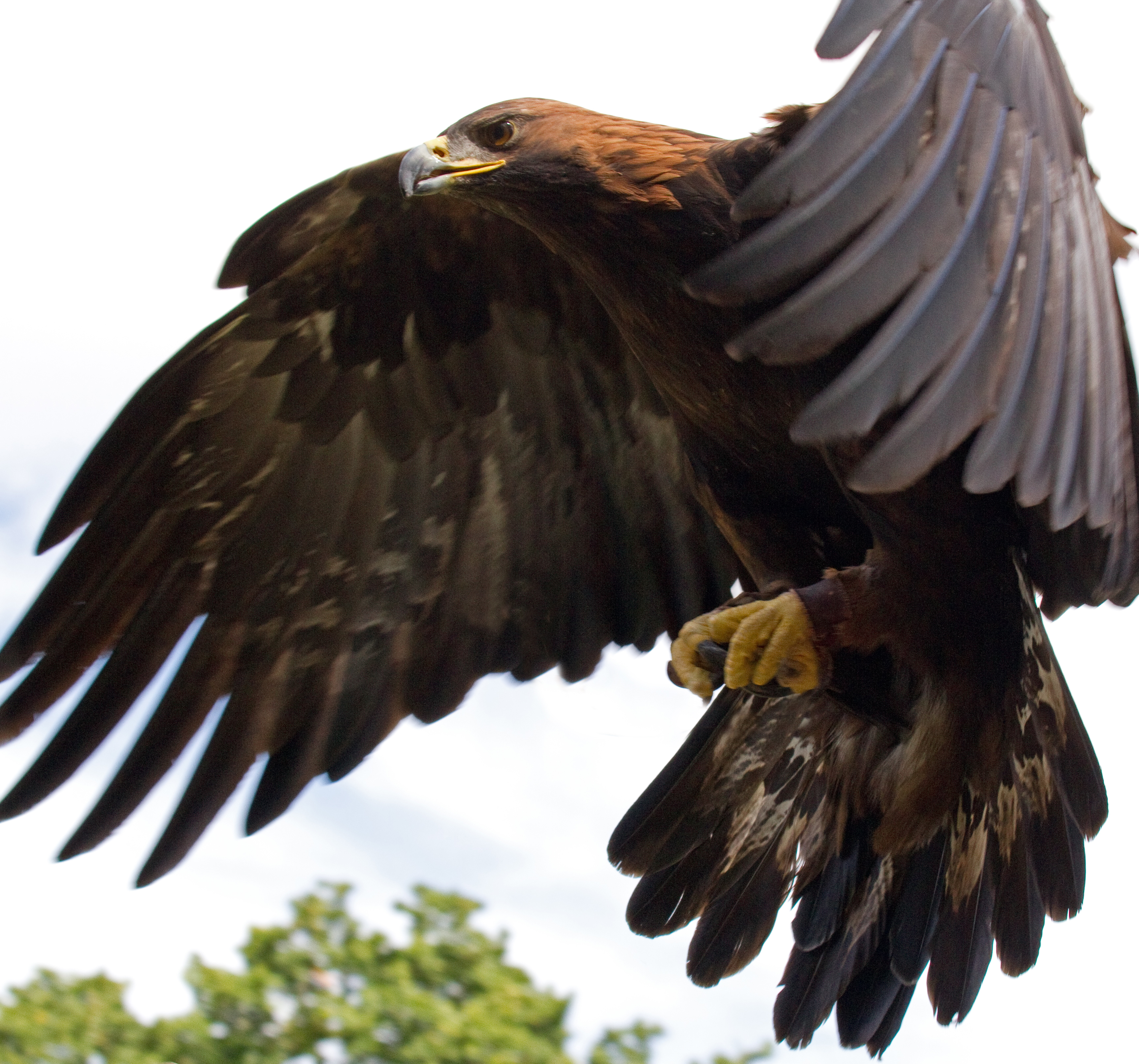
  - A living Aquila chrysaetos, or golden eagle
    †Aquila chysaetos
- †Araneaovoius
  - †Araneaovoius columbiae
- Araneus
  - †Araneus absconditus – type locality for species
  - †Araneus cinefactus – type locality for species
  - †Araneus delitus – type locality for species
  - †Araneus emertoni – type locality for species
  - †Araneus kinchloeae – type locality for species
  - †Araneus longimanus – type locality for species
  - †Araneus meeki – type locality for species
  - †Araneus vulcanalis – type locality for species
- †Archaeochrysa
  - †Archaeochrysa creedei – type locality for species
  - †Archaeochrysa fracta – type locality for species
  - †Archaeochrysa paranervis – type locality for species
- †Archaeomnium
  - †Archaeomnium brownii
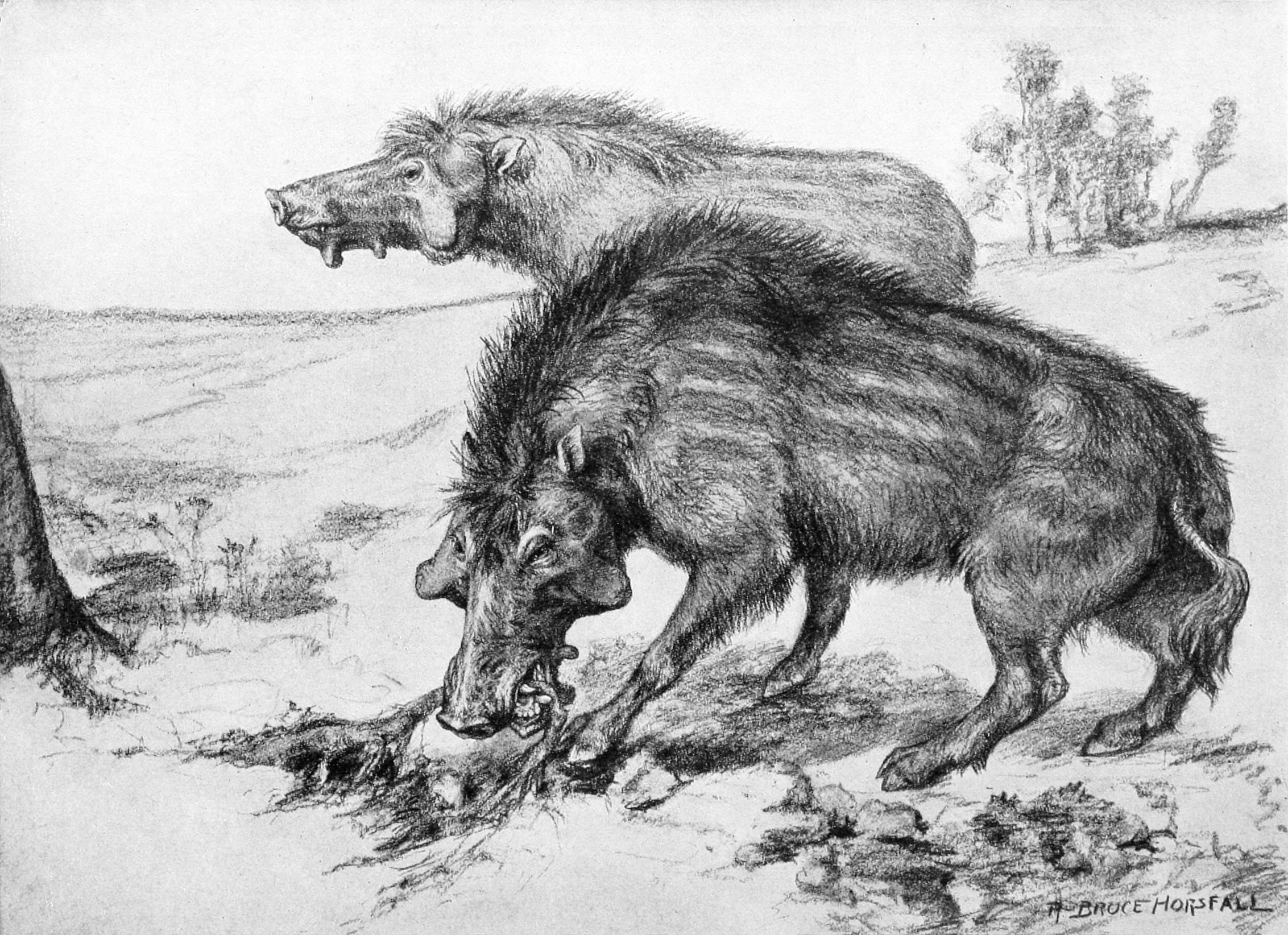
- Life restoration of the Eocene-Oligocene entelodont mammal Archaeotherium
  †Archaeotherium
  - †Archaeotherium mortoni
- †Archalia – type locality for genus
  - †Archalia femorata – type locality for species
- †Archimyrmex – type locality for genus
  - †Archimyrmex rostratus – type locality for species
- †Archiponera – type locality for genus
  - †Archiponera wheeleri – type locality for species
- †Archiraphidia
  - †Archiraphidia somnolenta – type locality for species
  - †Archiraphidia tranquilla – type locality for species
  - †Archiraphidia tumulata – type locality for species
- Arctobyrrhus
  - †Arctobyrrhus subcanus
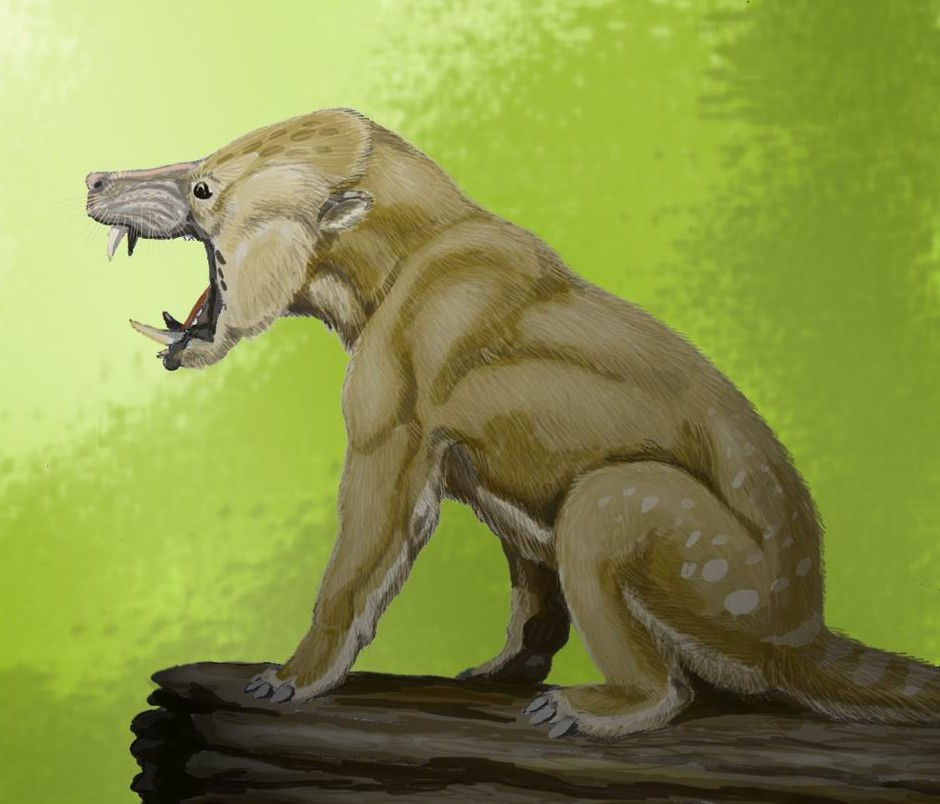
- Life restoration of the Paleocene mammal Arctocyon
  †Arctocyon
  - †Arctocyon mumak
- †Arctodontomys
  - †Arctodontomys nuptus
  - †Arctodontomys wilsoni
- †Arctostylops – tentative report
- †Arfia
  - †Arfia opisthotoma
  - †Arfia shoshoniensis
- †Argia
  - †Argia aliena – type locality for species
- †Arhopalus
  - †Arhopalus pavitus – type locality for species
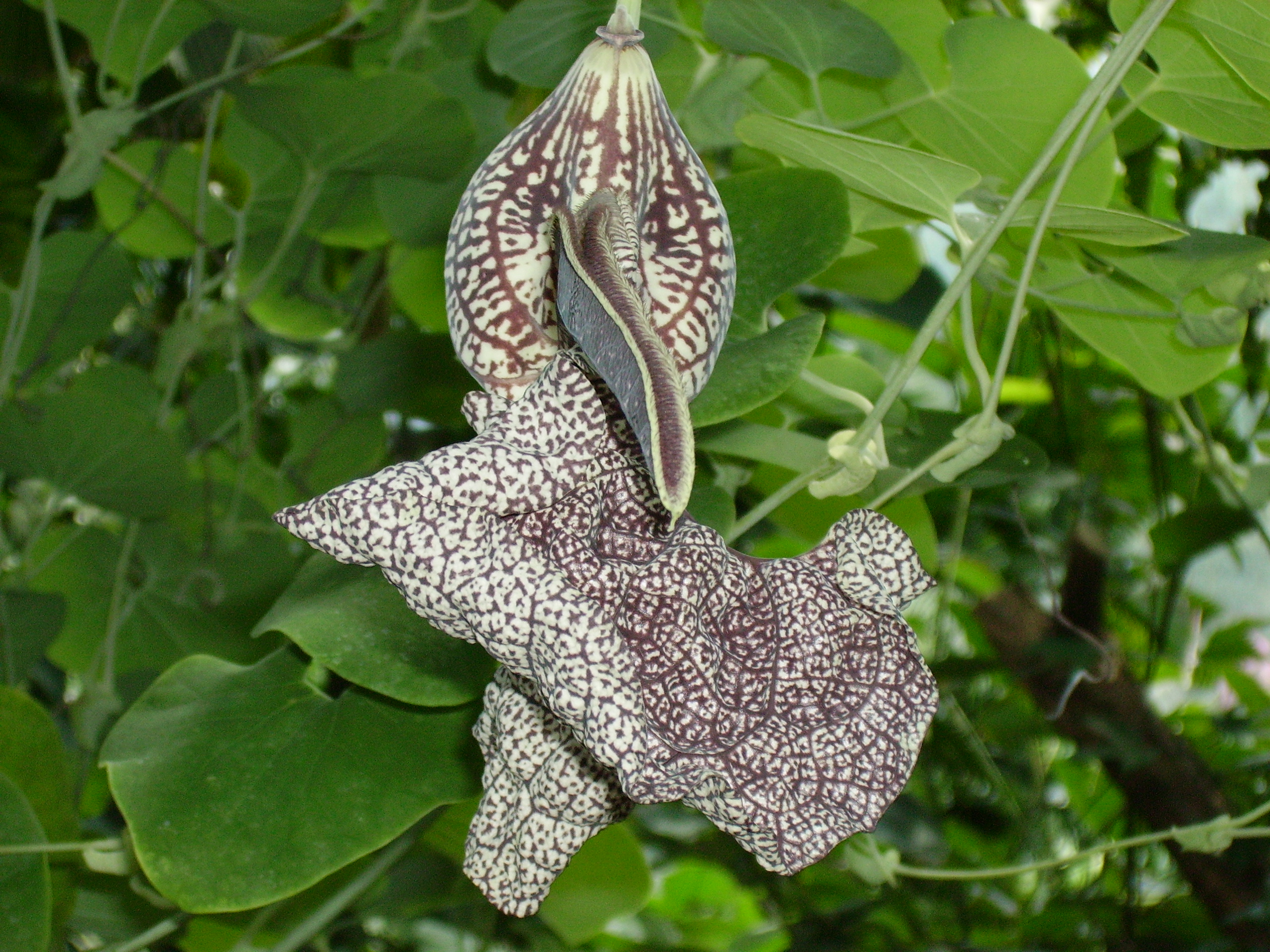
- Flower of a living Aristolochia, or birthwort
  †Aristolochia
  - †Aristolochia mortua
- †Artimonius
  - †Artimonius australis
  - †Artimonius nocerai
- †Artocarpus
  - †Artocarpus lessigiana
- †Asilus
  - †Asilus amelanchieris – type locality for species
  - †Asilus curculionis – type locality for species
  - †Asilus florissantinus – type locality for species
  - †Asilus peritulus – type locality for species
  - †Asilus wickhami – type locality for species
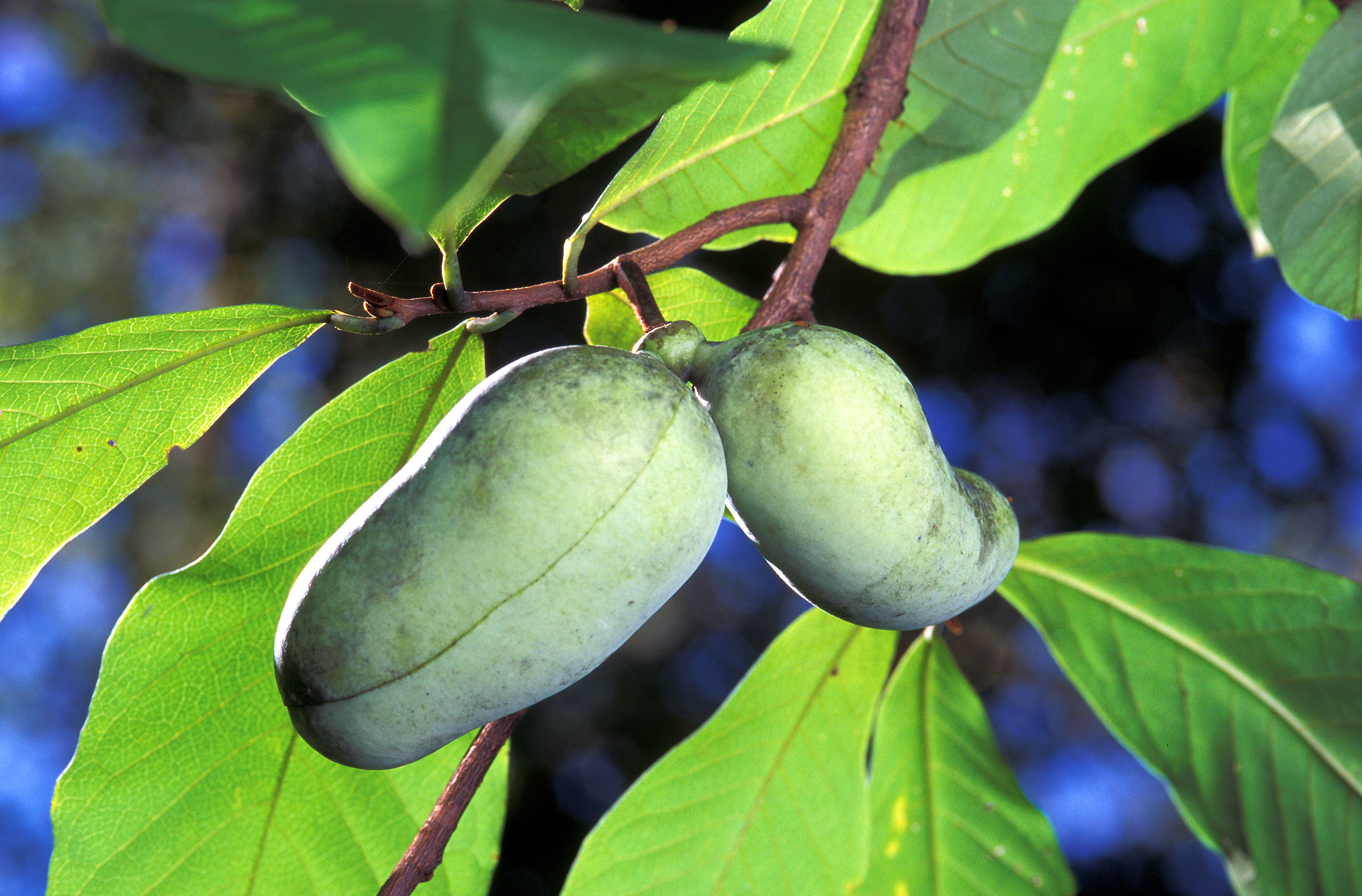
- Fruit and foliage of an Asimina tree, or pawpaw
  †Asimina
  - †Asimina vesperalis
- Asio
- †Aspicolpus
  - †Aspicolpus repertus – type locality for species
- †Asplenium
  - †Asplenium delicatula – or unidentified comparable form
- †Astephus
- †Aster
  - †Aster florissantia
- †Asterocarpinus
  - †Asterocarpinus perplexans
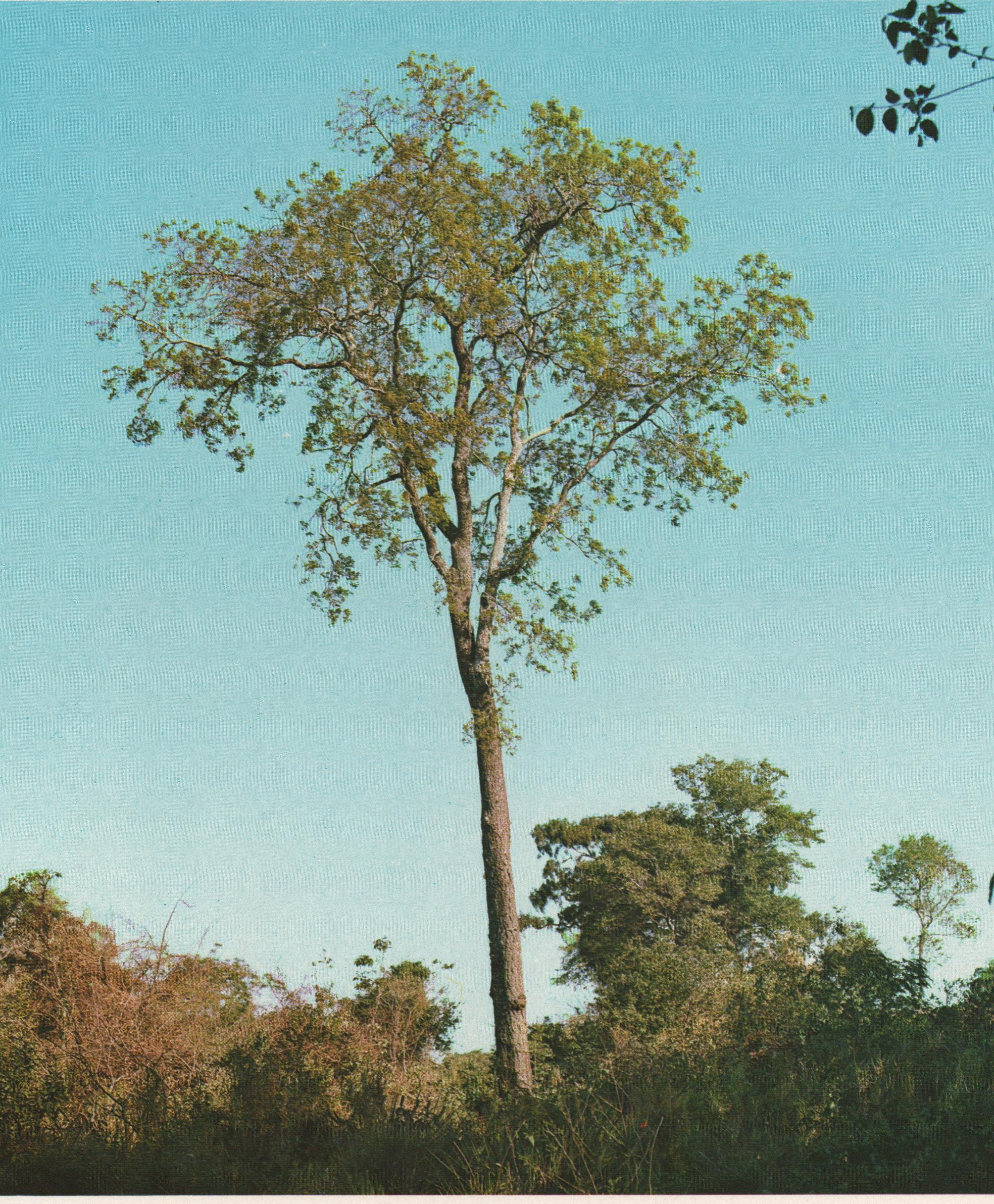
- A living Astronium tree, which is related to cashews
  †Astronium
  - †Astronium calyx
  - †Astronium truncatum
- Asynarchus
- Ataenius
  - †Ataenius patescens – type locality for species
  - †Ataenius restructus – type locality for species
- †Atalantycha
  - †Atalantycha humata – type locality for species
- †Athalia
  - †Athalia wheeleri – type locality for species
- Atheta
  - †Atheta florissantensis – type locality for species
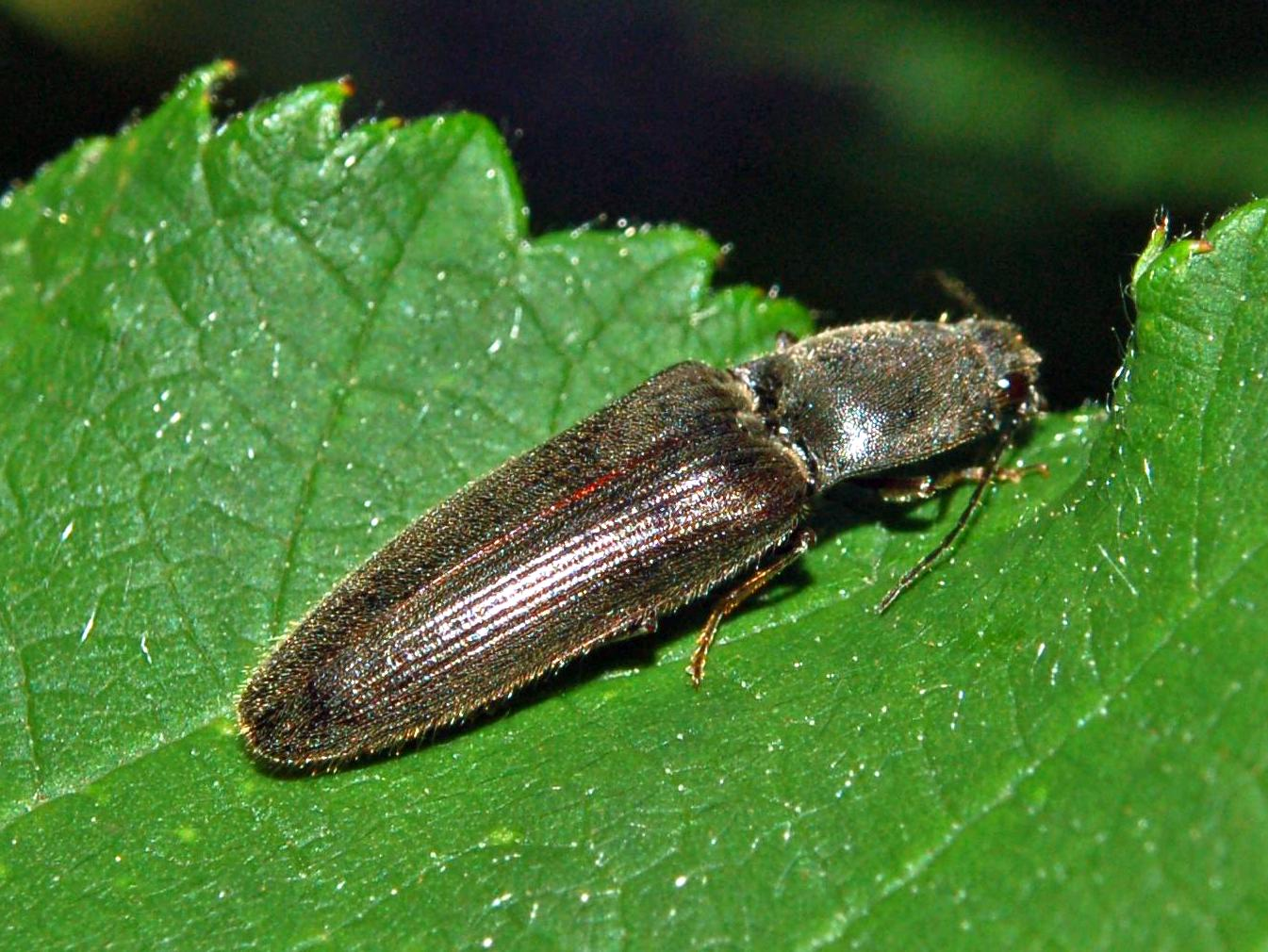
- A living Athous click beetle
  †Athous
  - †Athous contusus – type locality for species
  - †Athous fractus – type locality for species
  - †Athous lethalis – type locality for species
- †Athyana
  - †Athyana haydenii
- †Atocus – type locality for genus
  - †Atocus cockerelli – type locality for species
  - †Atocus defessus – type locality for species
- †Atrichops
  - †Atrichops hesperius – type locality for species
- †Attagenus
  - †Attagenus aboriginalis – type locality for species
  - †Attagenus sopitus – type locality for species
- †Aulacidea
  - †Aulacidea ampliforma – type locality for species
  - †Aulacidea progenetrix – type locality for species
- †Aulacus
  - †Aulacus bradleyi – type locality for species
- †Aulobaris
  - †Aulobaris anicilla – type locality for species
  - †Aulobaris circumscripta
  - †Aulobaris damnata – type locality for species
- †Auraria – type locality for genus
  - †Auraria urbana – type locality for species
- †Averrhoites
  - †Averrhoites affinis
- †Axestemys – type locality for genus
  - †Axestemys puercensis – or unidentified comparable form
  - †Axestemys quinni – type locality for species
- Aythya
  - †Aythya affinis
  - †Aythya americana
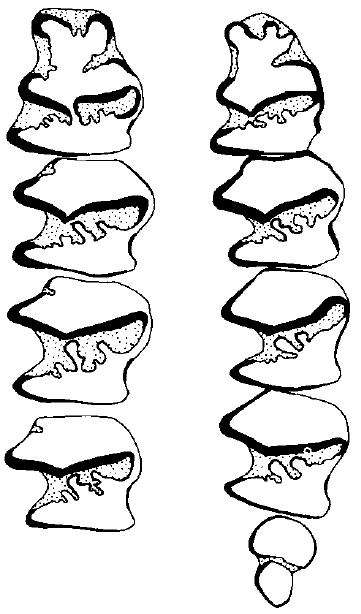
- Illustration of the fossilized teeth of the Pliocene-Pleistocene rabbit relative Aztlanolagus
  †Aztlanolagus

== B ==
- †Baena
  - †Baena arenosa
- †Baioconodon
  - †Baioconodon denverensis – type locality for species
  - †Baioconodon nordicus
- †Baltemys
  - †Baltemys velogastros – type locality for species
- †Baptemys
  - †Baptemys wyomingensis
- †Barbouromeryx
- †Baris
  - †Baris antediluviana – type locality for species
  - †Baris cremastorhynchoides – type locality for species
  - †Baris divisa – type locality for species
  - †Baris florissantensis – type locality for species
  - †Baris harlani – type locality for species
  - †Baris hoveyi – type locality for species
  - †Baris imperfecta – type locality for species
  - †Baris matura – type locality for species
  - †Baris nearctica – type locality for species
  - †Baris primalis – type locality for species
  - †Baris renovata – type locality for species
  - †Baris schucherti – type locality for species
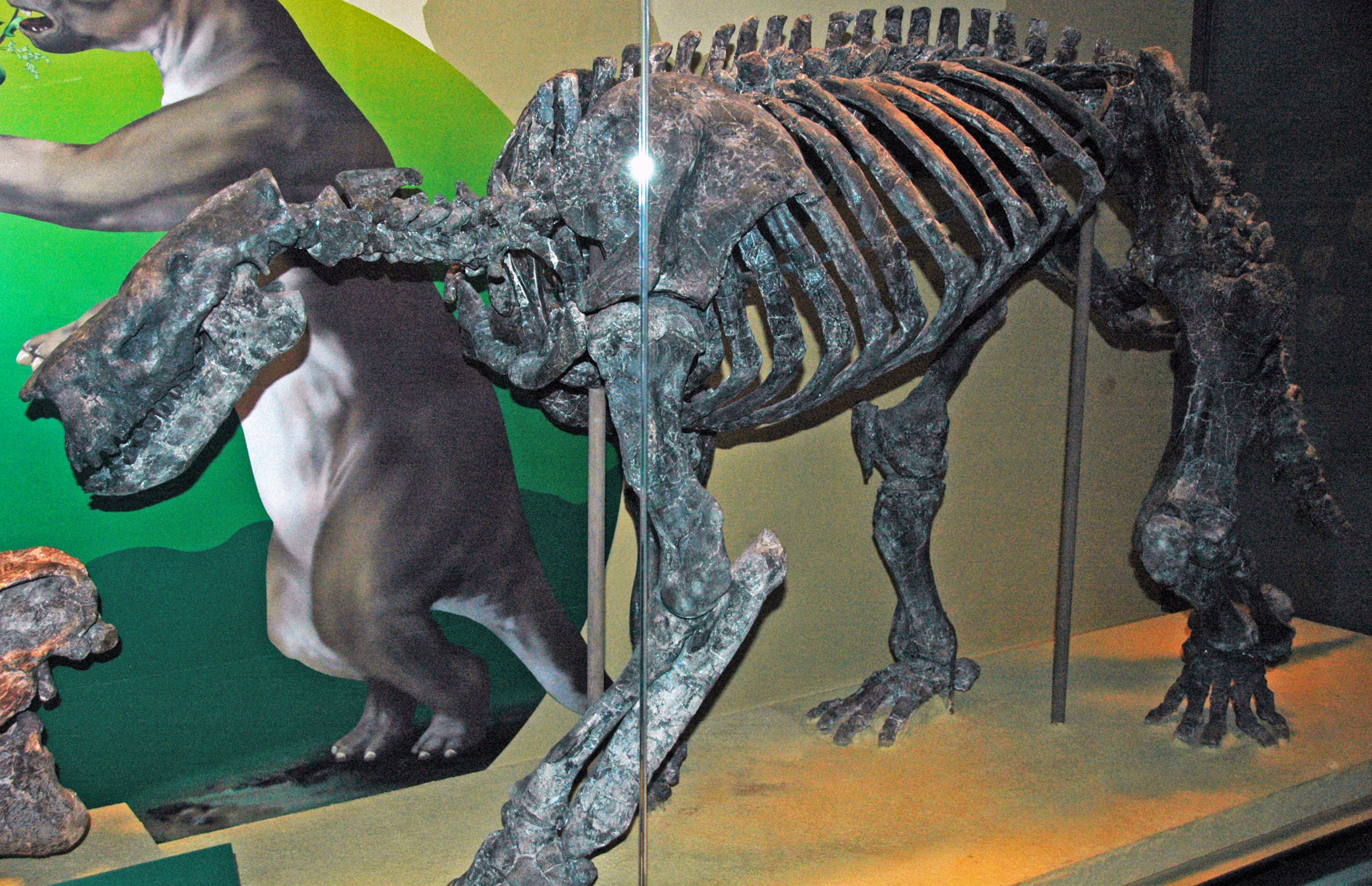
- Mounted fossilized skeleton of the Paleocene-Eocene pantodont mammal Barylambda
  †Barylambda
  - †Barylambda faberi – type locality for species
- †Barylypa
  - †Barylypa primigena – type locality for species
- †Bassus
  - †Bassus juvenilis – type locality for species
  - †Bassus miocenicus – type locality for species
  - †Bassus velatus – type locality for species
- †Bathornis – type locality for genus
  - †Bathornis veredus – type locality for species
- †Bathygenys
  - †Bathygenys alpha
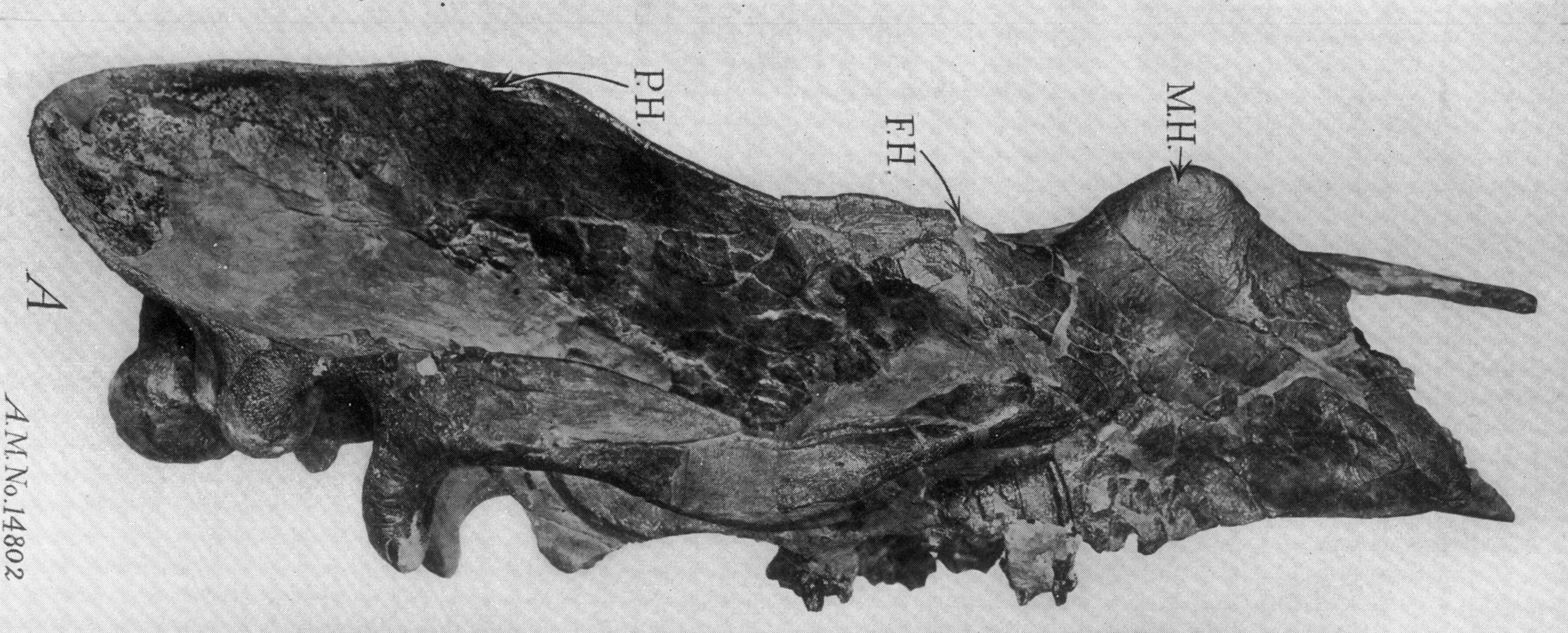
- Fossilized cranium of the Eocene uintathere mammal Bathyopsis
  †Bathyopsis
  - †Bathyopsis fissidens
- †Belyta
  - †Belyta mortuella – type locality for species
- Bembidion
  - †Bembidion bimaculatum
  - †Bembidion breve
  - †Bembidion coloradense
  - †Bembidion constricticolle
- †Bembidium
  - †Bembidium florissantensis – type locality for species
  - †Bembidium obductum – type locality for species
  - †Bembidium tumulorum – type locality for species
- †Beringiaphyllum
  - †Beringiaphyllum cupanioides
- †Beris
  - †Beris miocenica – type locality for species
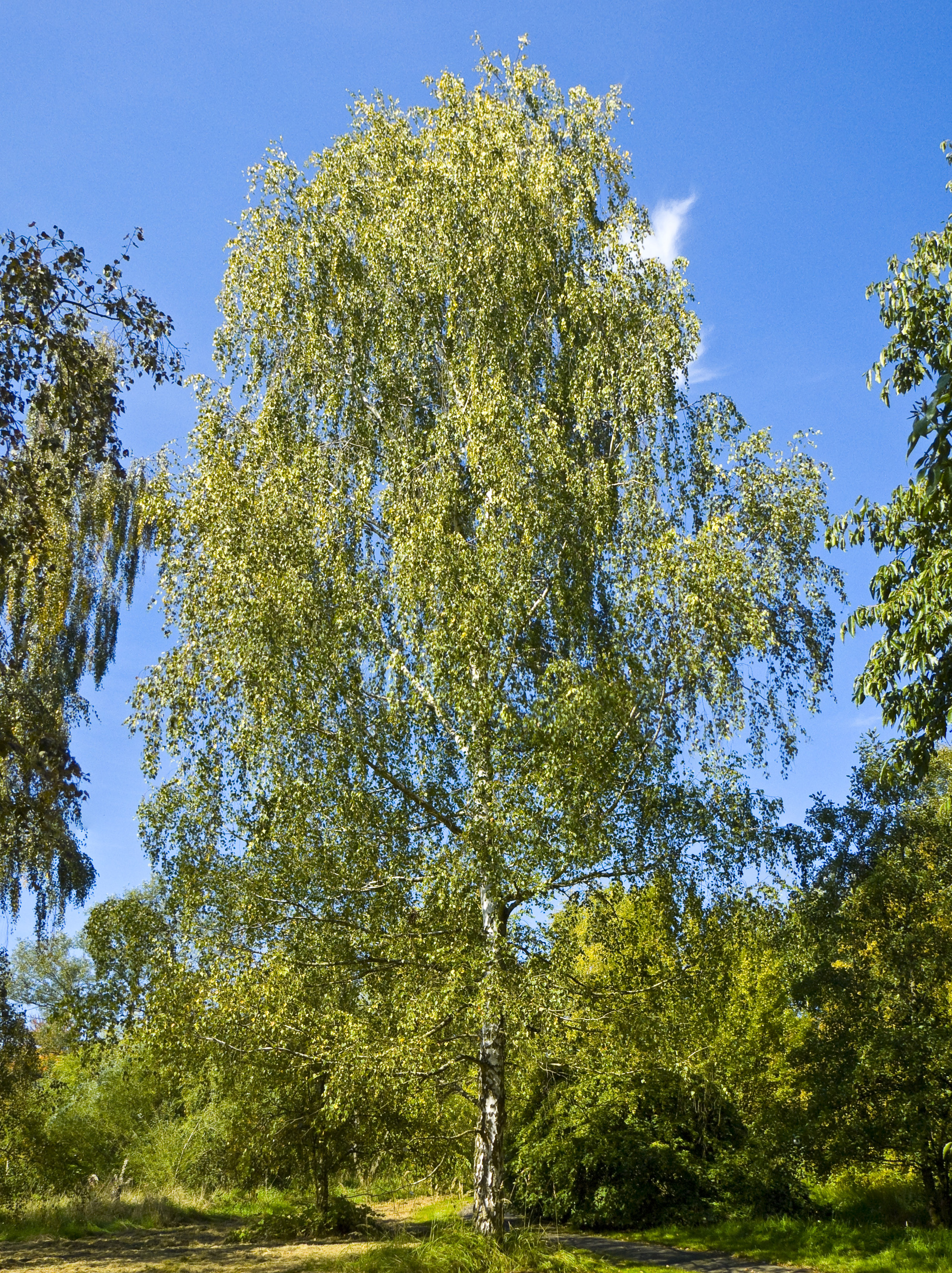
- A living Betula, or birch tree
  Betula
  - †Betula stevensoni
- Bibio
  - †Bibio capnodes – type locality for species
  - †Bibio cockerelli – type locality for species
  - †Bibio excurvatus – type locality for species
  - †Bibio explanatus – type locality for species
  - †Bibio jamesi – type locality for species
  - †Bibio podager – type locality for species
  - †Bibio vetus – type locality for species
  - †Bibio vulcanius – type locality for species
  - †Bibio wickhami – type locality for species
- †Bibiodes
  - †Bibiodes intermedia – type locality for species
- †Bidessus
  - †Bidessus laminarum – type locality for species
- Bison
  - †Bison antiquus – or unidentified comparable form
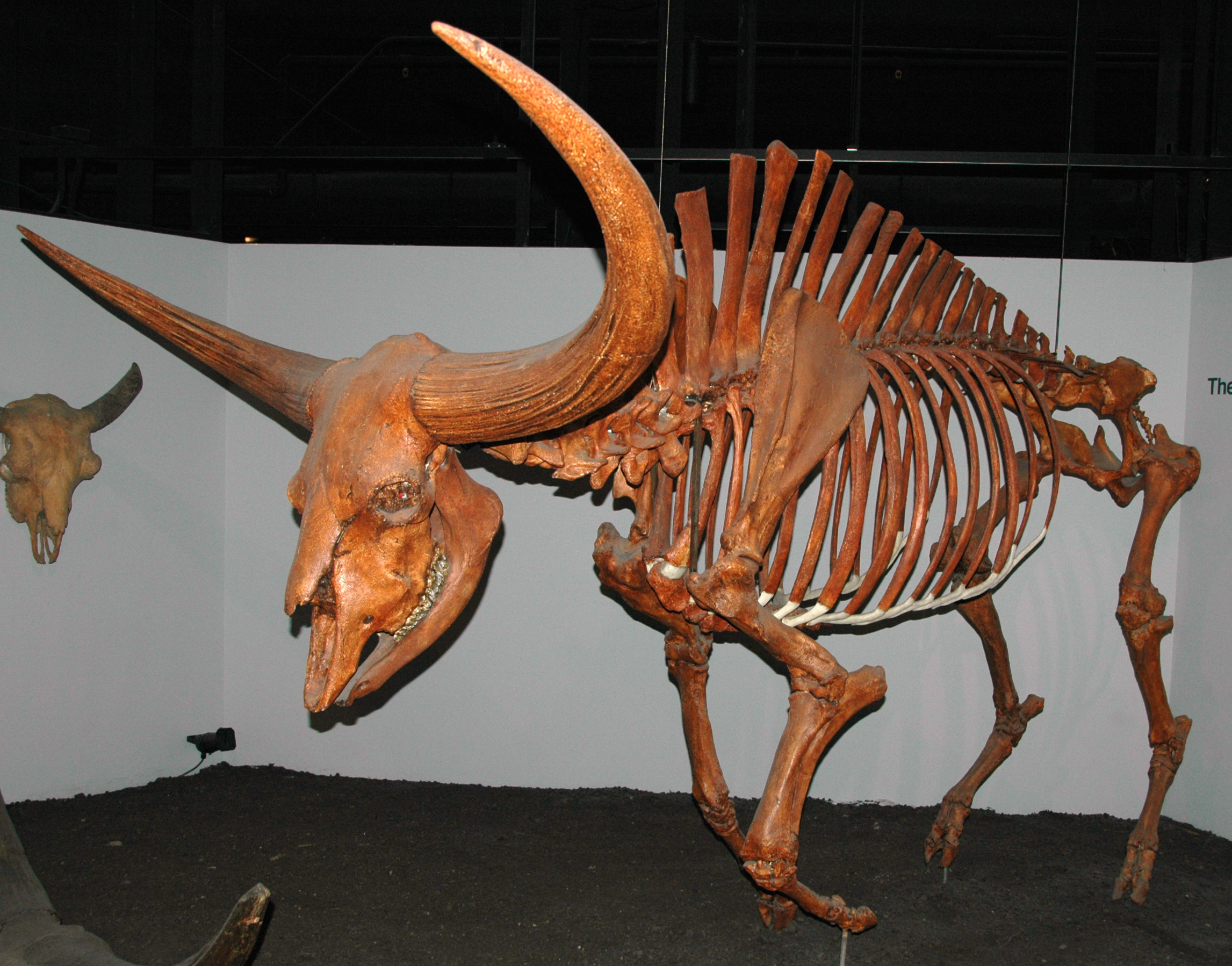
  - Mounted fossilized skeleton of the Pleistocene Bison latifrons, or long-horned bison
    †Bison latifrons
- †Blapstinus
  - †Blapstinus linellii – type locality for species
- †Blechnum
  - †Blechnum anceps
- Bledius
  - †Bledius osborni
  - †Bledius primitiarum – type locality for species
  - †Bledius soli – type locality for species
  - †Bledius suturalis
- †Blickomylus
  - †Blickomylus galushai
- Boletina
  - †Boletina hypogaea – type locality for species
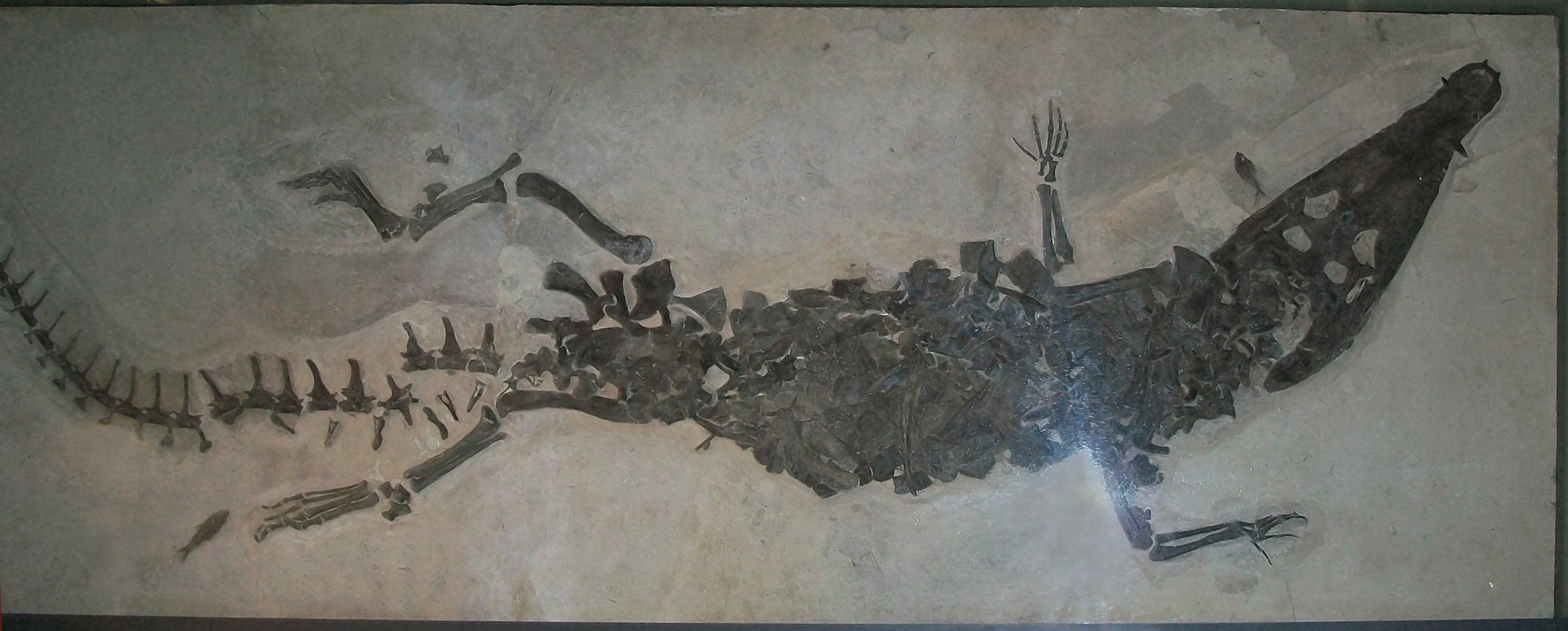
- Fossilized skeleton of the Late Cretaceous-Eocene crocodilian Borealosuchus
  †Borealosuchus
- †Borophagus
  - †Borophagus pugnator
- †Bouromeryx
  - †Bouromeryx americanus – type locality for species
- †Brachinus
  - †Brachinus newberryi – type locality for species
  - †Brachinus repressus – type locality for species
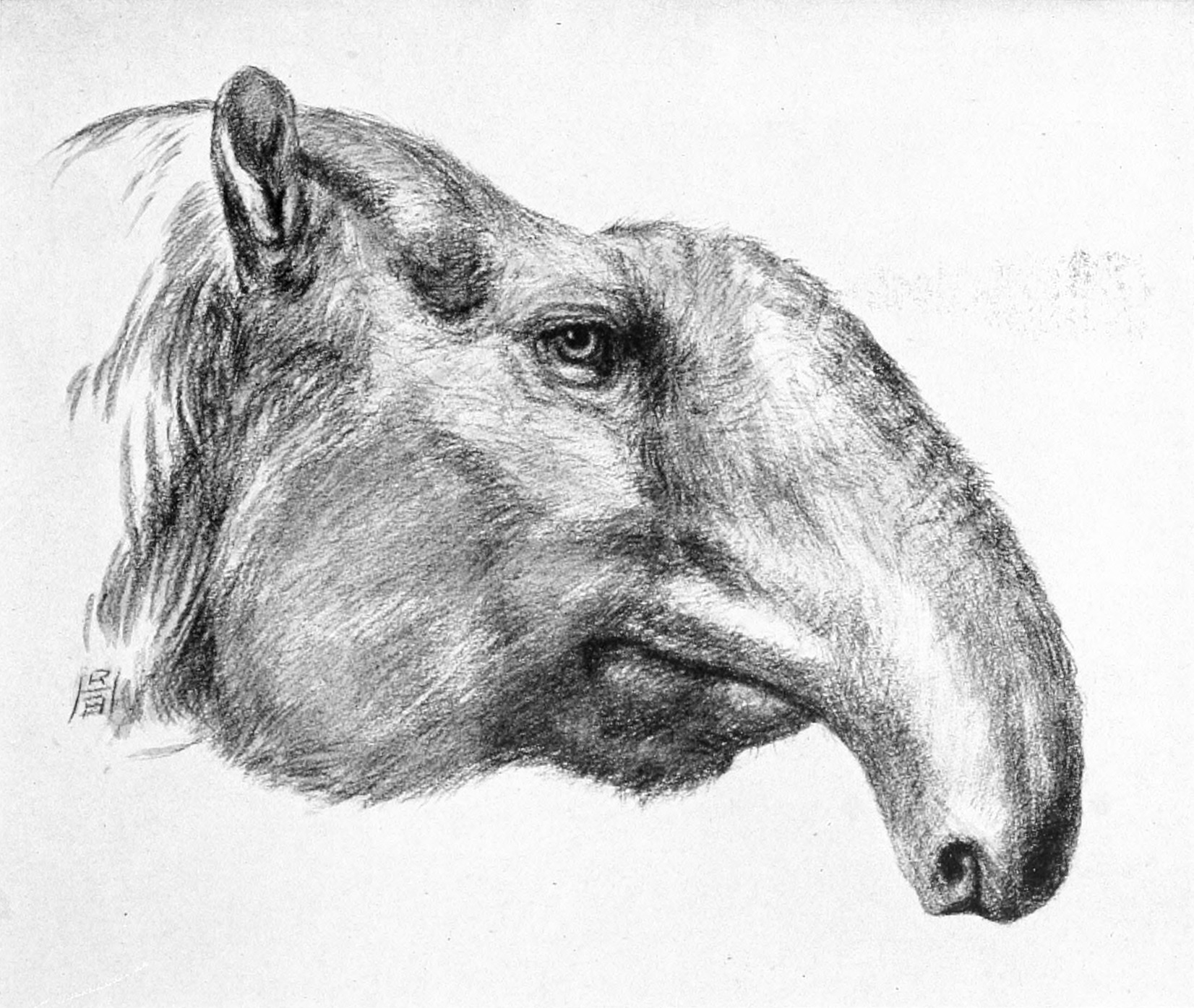
- Restorative portrait of the Miocene oreodont mammal Brachycrus
  †Brachycrus
- †Brachyerix
  - †Brachyerix macrotis
- Brachylagus
  - †Brachylagus coloradoensis – type locality for species
- †Brachyprotoma
  - †Brachyprotoma obtusata
- †Brachypsalis
  - †Brachypsalis modicus
- †Brachyrhynchocyon
- †Brachyspathus – type locality for genus
  - †Brachyspathus curiosus – type locality for species
- †Brachytarsus – tentative report
  - †Brachytarsus dubius – type locality for species
- Bracon
  - †Bracon abstractus – type locality for species
  - †Bracon cockerelli – type locality for species
  - †Bracon resurrectus – type locality for species
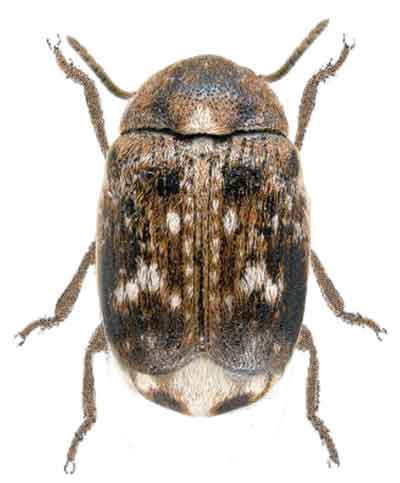
- A living Bruchus leaf beetle
  †Bruchus
  - †Bruchus aboriginalis – type locality for species
  - †Bruchus anilis – type locality for species
  - †Bruchus antaeus – type locality for species
  - †Bruchus bowditchi – type locality for species
  - †Bruchus carpophiloides – type locality for species
  - †Bruchus dormescens – type locality for species
  - †Bruchus exhumatus – type locality for species
  - †Bruchus henshawi – type locality for species
  - †Bruchus osborni – type locality for species
  - †Bruchus succintus – type locality for species
- †Bruesisca
  - †Bruesisca submersus – type locality for species
- Bubo
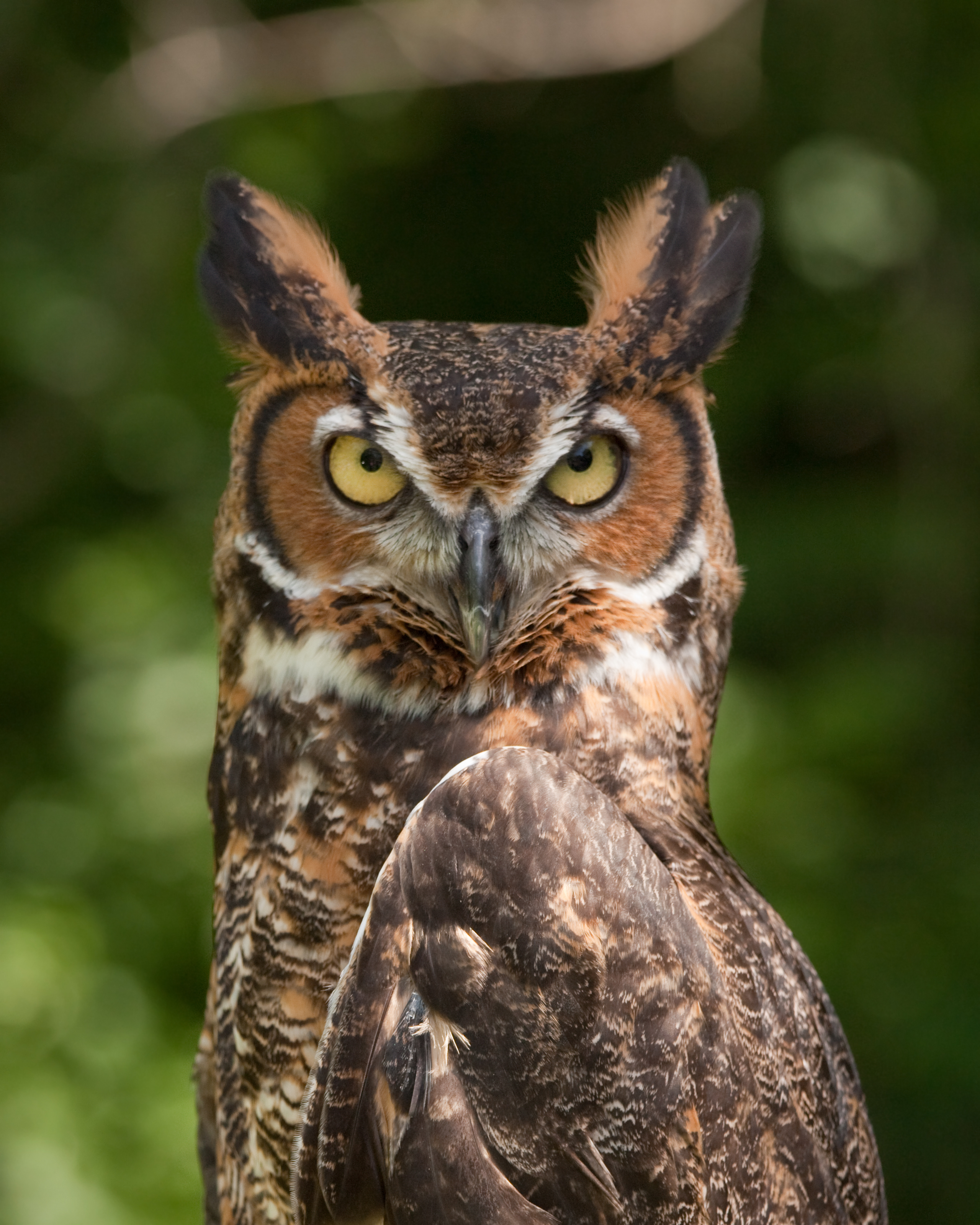
  - A living Bubo virginianus, or great horned owl
    †Bubo virginianus
- Bufo
  - †Bufo cognatus
  - †Bufo douglassi
  - †Bufo woodhousei
- †Bunophorus
  - †Bunophorus grangeri
  - †Bunophorus pattersoni
  - †Bunophorus robustus
  - †Bunophorus sinclairi
- †Buprestis
  - †Buprestis florissantensis – type locality for species
  - †Buprestis megistarche – type locality for species
  - †Buprestis scudderi – type locality for species
- †Bursera
  - †Bursera serrulata
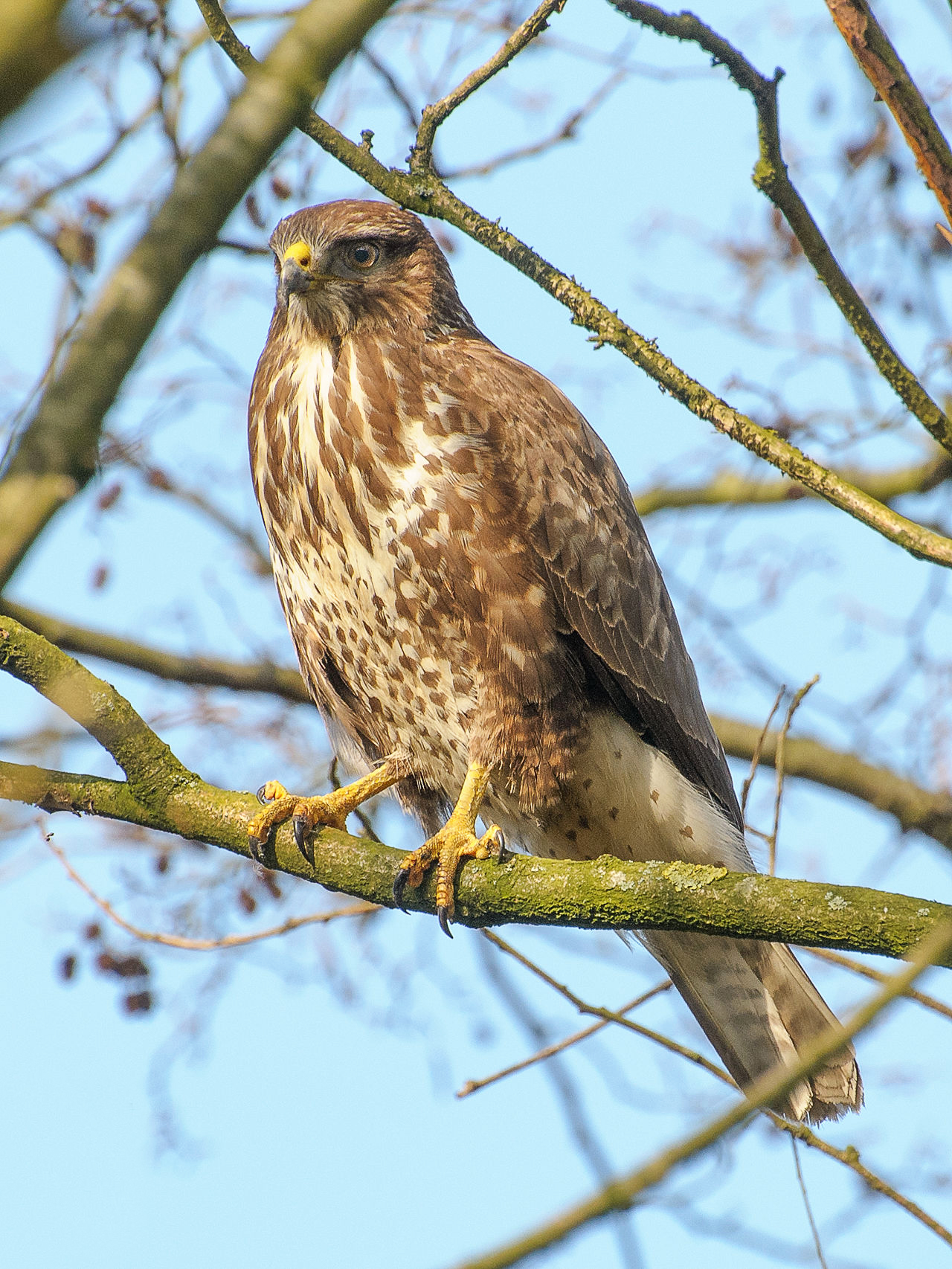
- A living Buteo hawk
  Buteo
  - †Buteo fluviaticus – type locality for species
- Byrrhus
  - †Byrrhus eximius
  - †Byrrhus romingeri
- †Bythoscopus
  - †Bythoscopus lapidescens – type locality for species

== C ==
- †Cacalydus – type locality for genus
  - †Cacalydus exstirpatus – type locality for species
  - †Cacalydus lapsus – type locality for species
- †Cacogaster – type locality for genus
  - †Cacogaster novamaculatus – type locality for species
- †Cacoschistus – type locality for genus
  - †Cacoschistus maceriatus – type locality for species
- †Caenocholax
  - †Caenocholax barkleyi – type locality for species
  - †Caenocholax palusaxus – type locality for species
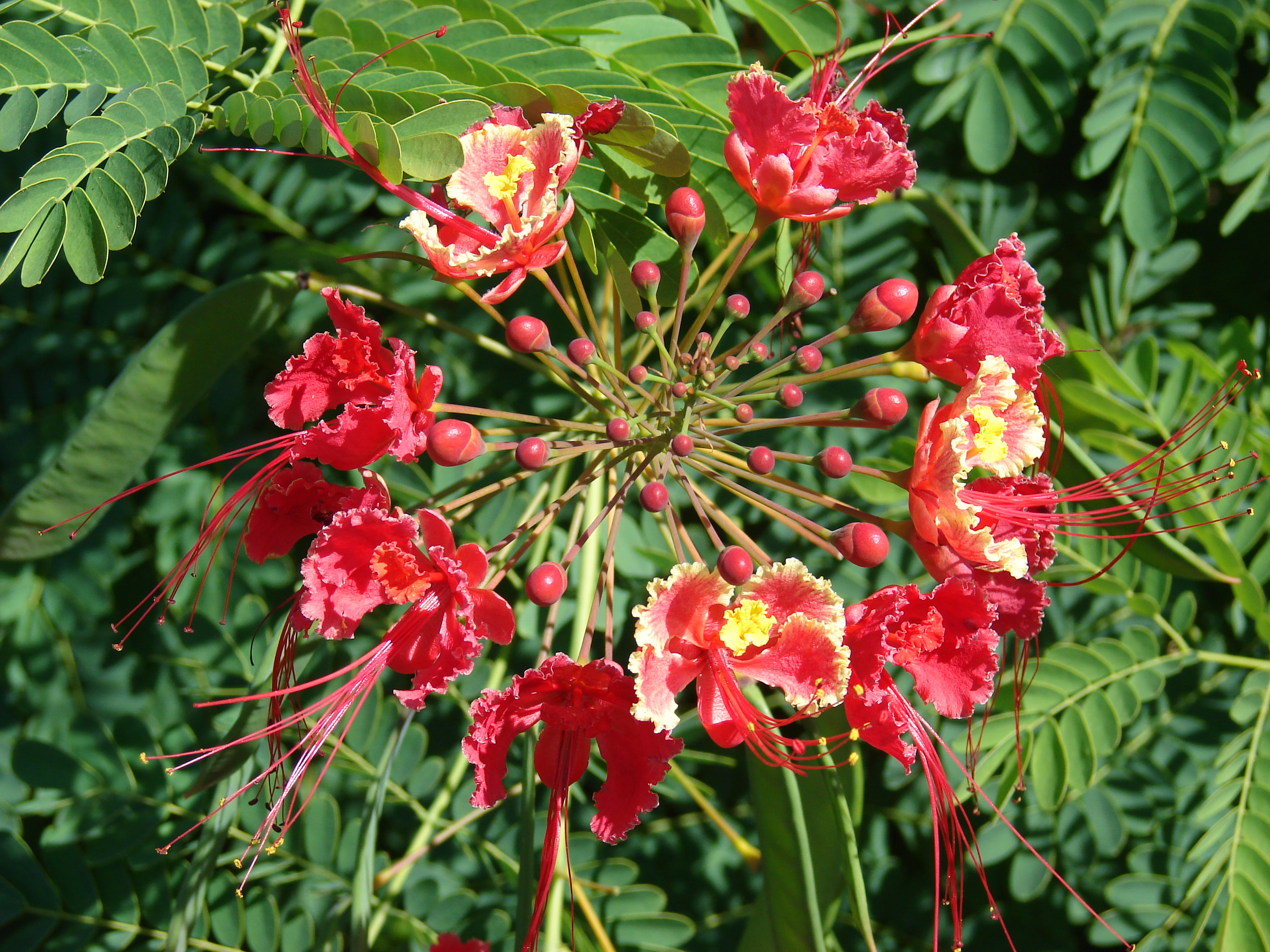
- Flower of a living Caesalpinia
  †Caesalpinia
  - †Caesalpinia pecorae
- †Caesalpinites
  - †Caesalpinites acuminatus
  - †Caesalpinites coloradicus
- †Calamagras – type locality for genus
  - †Calamagras angulatus – type locality for species
  - †Calamagras murivorus – type locality for species
  - †Calamagras talpivorus – type locality for species
- †Calandrites
  - †Calandrites cineratius
  - †Calandrites defessus
  - †Calandrites hindsi – type locality for species
  - †Calandrites ursorum – type locality for species
- †Calcarius
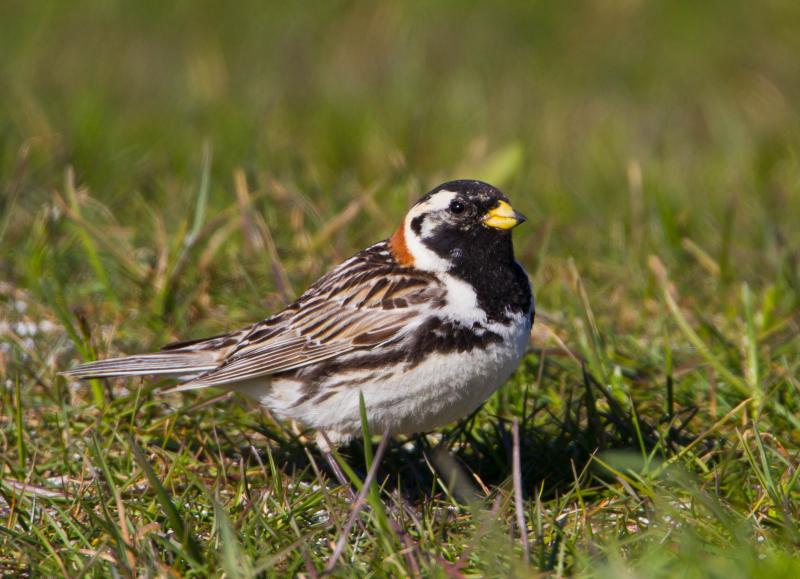
  - A living Calcarius lapponicus, or Lapland longspur
    †Calcarius lapponicus
  - †Calcarius ornatus
- †Calippus
  - †Calippus regulus
- †Caliroa
  - †Caliroa micrarche – type locality for species
  - †Caliroa mimus – type locality for species
  - †Caliroa revelata – type locality for species
- †Callidiopsites – type locality for genus
  - †Callidiopsites grandiceps – type locality for species
- †Callimoxys
  - †Callimoxys primordialis – type locality for species
- †Callomyia – tentative report
  - †Callomyia hypolitha – type locality for species
- Calosoma
  - †Calosoma calvini – type locality for species
  - †Calosoma cockerelli – type locality for species
  - †Calosoma emmonsi – type locality for species
- †Calyptapis – type locality for genus
  - †Calyptapis florissantensis – type locality for species
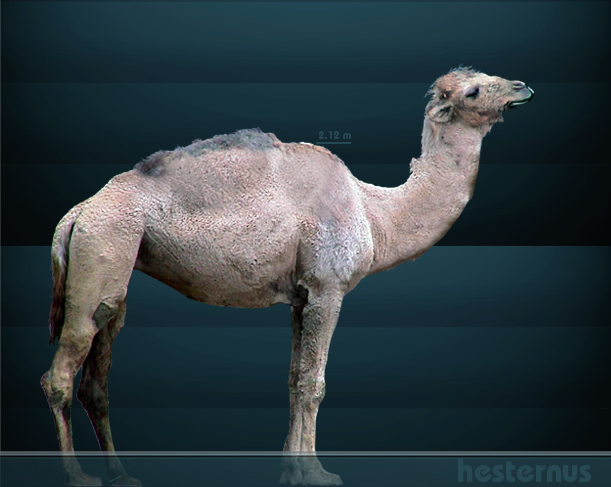
- Life restoration of the Pliocene-Holocene camel Camelops
  †Camelops
  - †Camelops hesternus
- †Camerotops
  - †Camerotops solidatus – type locality for species
- Camponotus
  - †Camponotus fuscipennis – type locality for species
  - †Camponotus microcephalus – type locality for species
  - †Camponotus petrifactus – type locality for species
- Canis
  - †Canis edwardii – or unidentified comparable form
  - †Canis latrans
- †Cantius
  - †Cantius abditus
  - †Cantius frugivorus
  - †Cantius mckennai
  - †Cantius ralstoni
- †Capnobotes
  - †Capnobotes silens
- †Capnochroa
  - †Capnochroa senilis – type locality for species
- †Capsus
  - †Capsus lacus – type locality for species
  - †Capsus obsolefactus – type locality for species
- †Carabites – tentative report
  - †Carabites arapahoensis – type locality for species
- Carabus
  - †Carabus jeffersoni – type locality for species
- †Cardichelyon
  - †Cardichelyon rogerwoodi – or unidentified comparable form
- †Cardiolophus
  - †Cardiolophus radinskyi
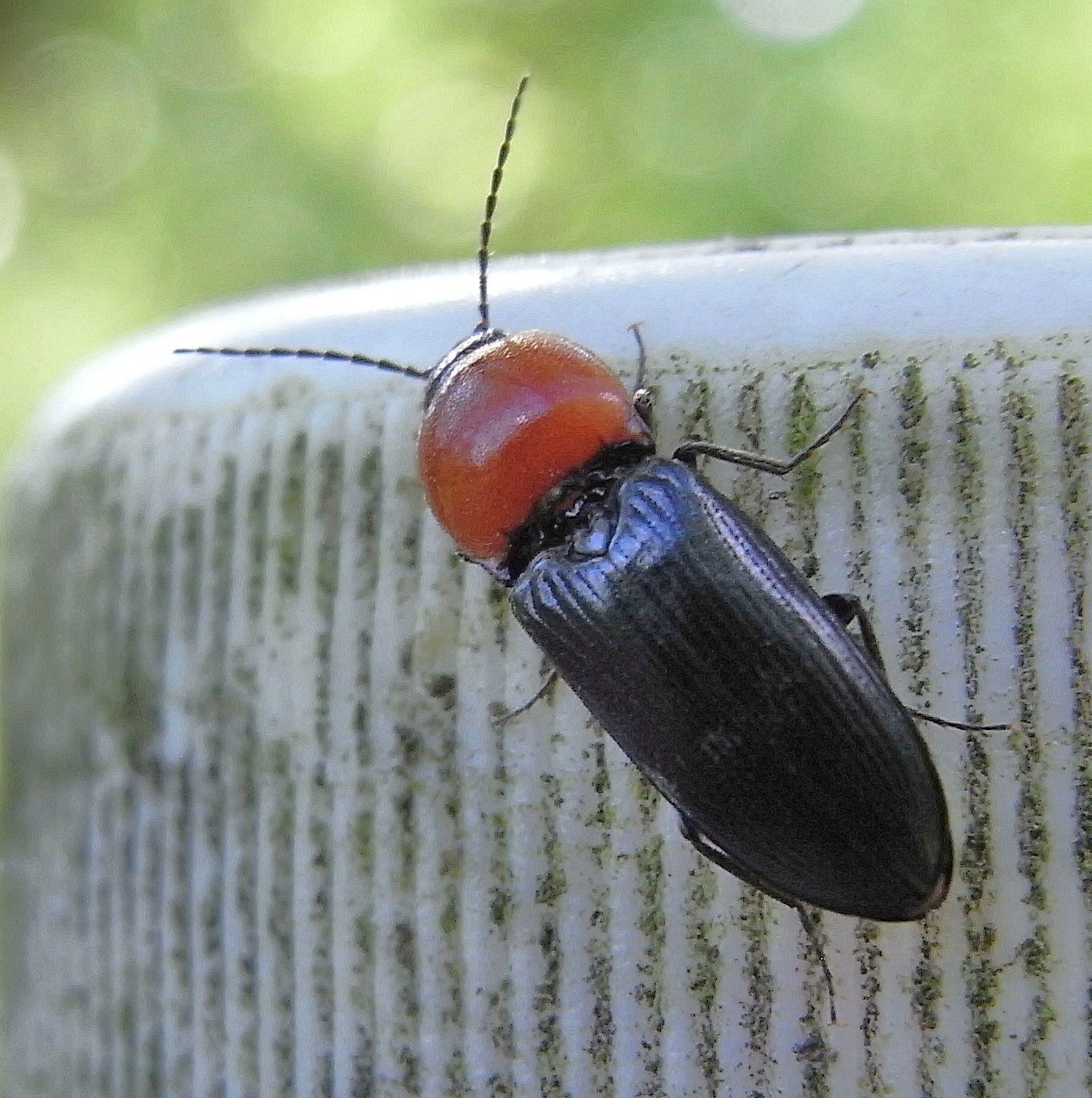
- A living Cardiophorus click beetle
  †Cardiophorus
  - †Cardiophorus cockerelli – type locality for species
  - †Cardiophorus deprivatus – type locality for species
  - †Cardiophorus exhumatus – type locality for species
  - †Cardiophorus florissantensis – type locality for species
  - †Cardiophorus lithographicus – type locality for species
  - †Cardiophorus requiescens – type locality for species
- Cardiospermum
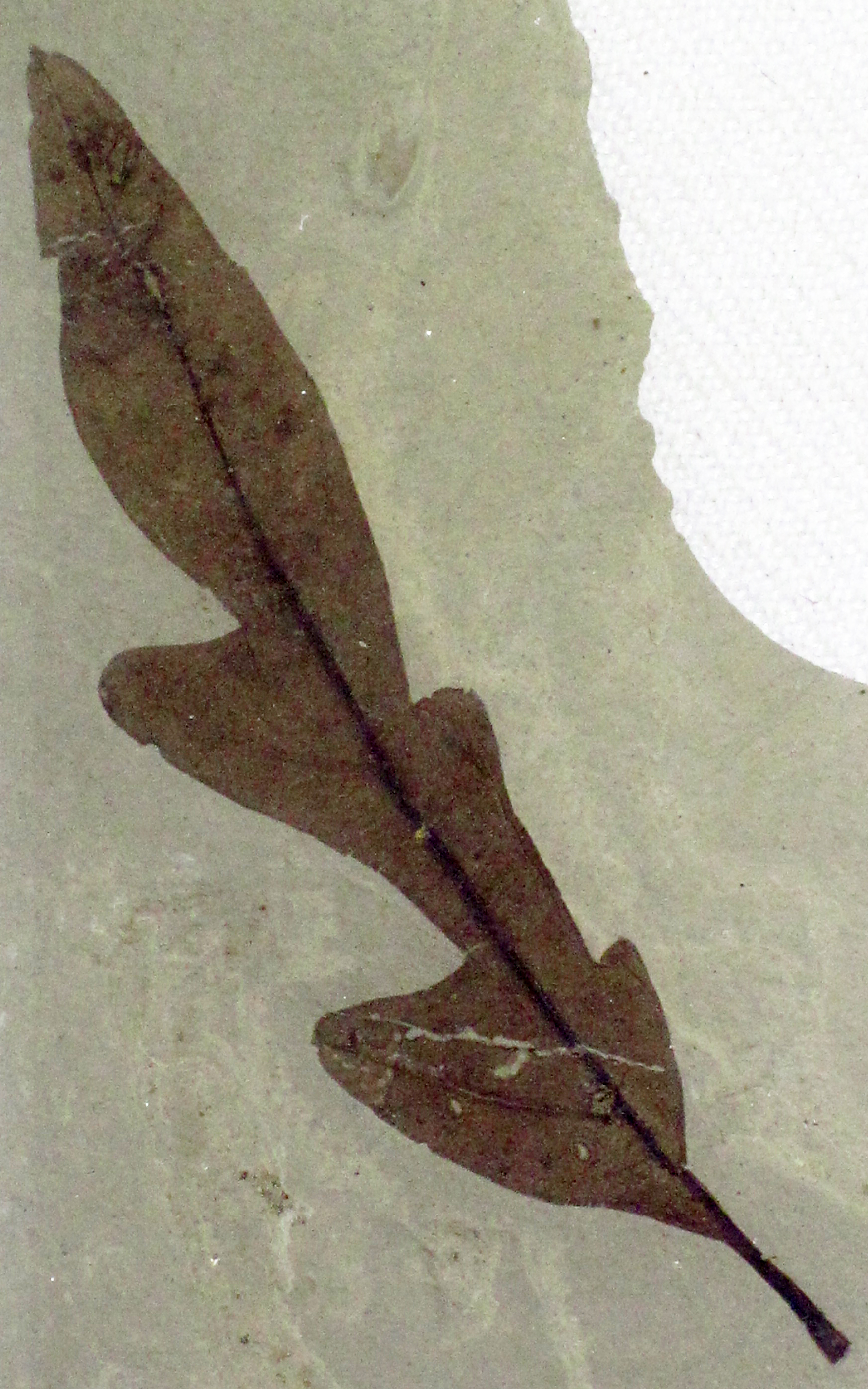
  - A Cardiospermum coloradensis leaf
    †Cardiospermum coloradensis
  - †Cardiospermum terminalis
- †Cariblattoides
  - †Cariblattoides labandeirai – type locality for species
- †Carmelus
  - †Carmelus gravatus – type locality for species
  - †Carmelus sepositus – type locality for species
- †Carpites
  - †Carpites gemmaceus
  - †Carpites miliodes
- †Carpocyon
  - †Carpocyon compressus
  - †Carpocyon robustus
- Carpodacus
  - †Carpodacus cassinii
- †Carpodaptes
  - †Carpodaptes aulacodon – type locality for species
  - †Carpodaptes cygneus
- †Carpophilus
  - †Carpophilus restructus – type locality for species
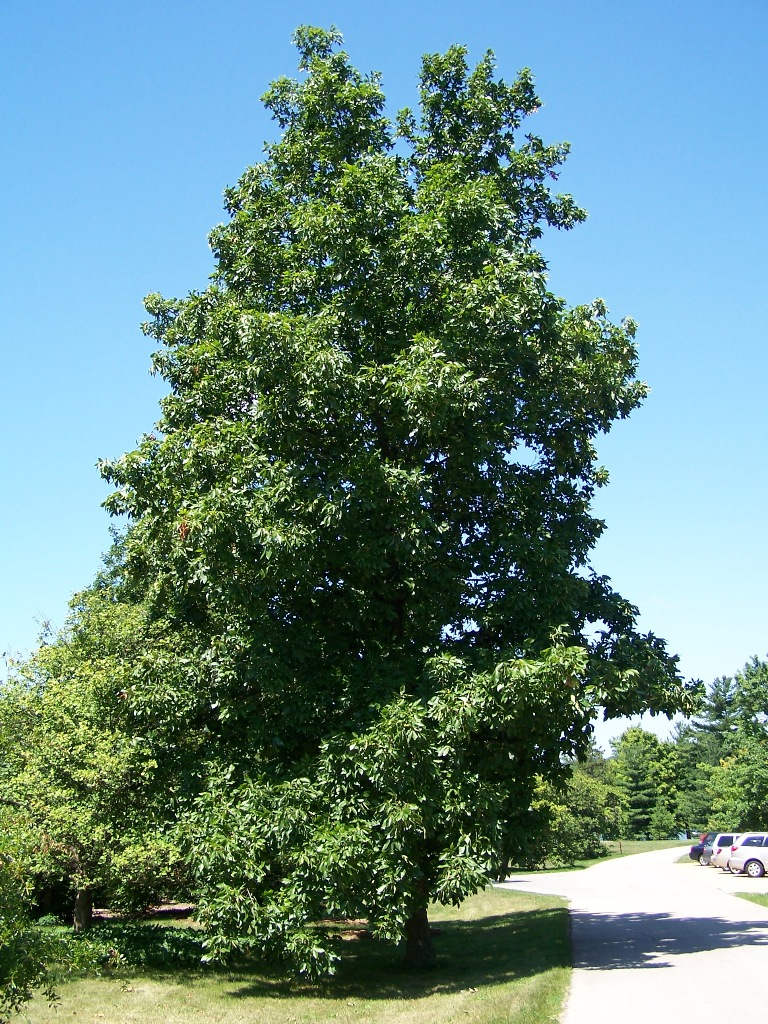
- A living Carya, or hickory tree
  Carya
  - †Carya antiquorum
  - †Carya florissantensis
  - †Carya libbeyi
- Castanea
  - †Castanea dolichophylla
  - †Castanea intermedia
- †Catobaris – type locality for genus
  - †Catobaris coenosa – type locality for species
- †Catopamera – type locality for genus
  - †Catopamera augheyi – type locality for species
  - †Catopamera bradleyi – type locality for species
- †Catopsalis
  - †Catopsalis alexanderi – type locality for species
- †Catopsylla – type locality for genus
  - †Catopsylla crawfordi – type locality for species
  - †Catopsylla prima – type locality for species
- †Cecidomyia – tentative report
  - †Cecidomyia pontaniiformis
- Cedrela
  - †Cedrela lancifolia
- †Cedrelospermum
  - †Cedrelospermum lineatum
- †Cedromus
  - †Cedromus wardi
- †Celastrilex – type locality for genus
  - †Celastrilex artocarpidioides – type locality for species. Formerly classified as Celastrinites artocarpidioides.
- †Celastrinites
  - †Celastrilex artocarpidioides – type locality for species. Later reclassified as Celastrilex artocarpidioides.
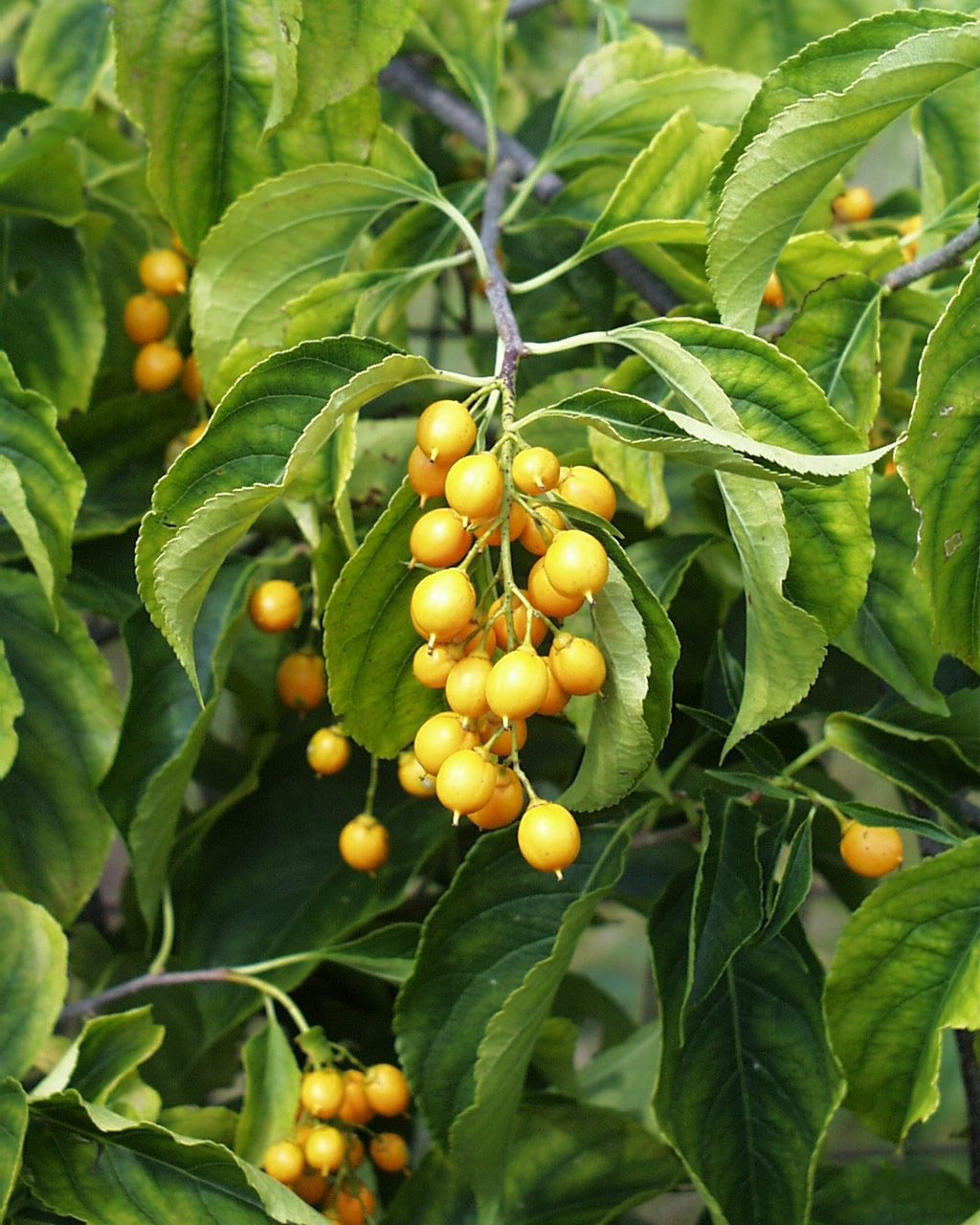
- Foliage and fruit of a living Celastrus, or staff vine
  †Celastrus
  - †Celastrus typica
  - †Celastrus winchesteri
- Celtis
  - †Celtis mccoshii
- †Centetodon
  - †Centetodon magnus
  - †Centetodon marginalis
  - †Centetodon patratus – type locality for species
- †Centimanomys
  - †Centimanomys galbreathi
  - †Centimanomys major
- †Centrinus
  - †Centrinus hypogaeus – type locality for species
  - †Centrinus obnuptus – type locality for species
  - †Centrinus vulcanicus – type locality for species
- †Centrocerus
  - †Centrocerus urophasianus
- †Centron – type locality for genus
  - †Centron moricollis – type locality for species
- †Cephalomyrmex – type locality for genus
  - †Cephalomyrmex rotundatus – type locality for species
- †Ceratina
  - †Ceratina disrupta – type locality for species
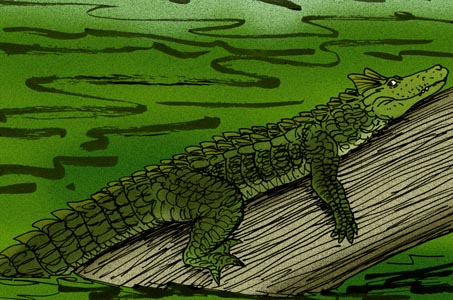
- Life restoration of the Paleocene-Eocene crocodilian Ceratosuchus
  †Ceratosuchus – type locality for genus
  - †Ceratosuchus burdoshi – type locality for species
- †Ceraturgus
  - †Ceraturgus praecursor – type locality for species
- Cercidiphyllum
  - †Cercidiphyllum arcticum
- Cercis
  - †Cercis parvifolia
- †Cercocarpus
  - †Cercocarpus myricaefolius
- †Cercopis
  - †Cercopis cephalinus – type locality for species
  - †Cercopis suffocata – type locality for species
- †Ceropalites – type locality for genus
  - †Ceropalites infelix – type locality for species
- †Ceruchus
  - †Ceruchus fuchsii – type locality for species
- Cervus
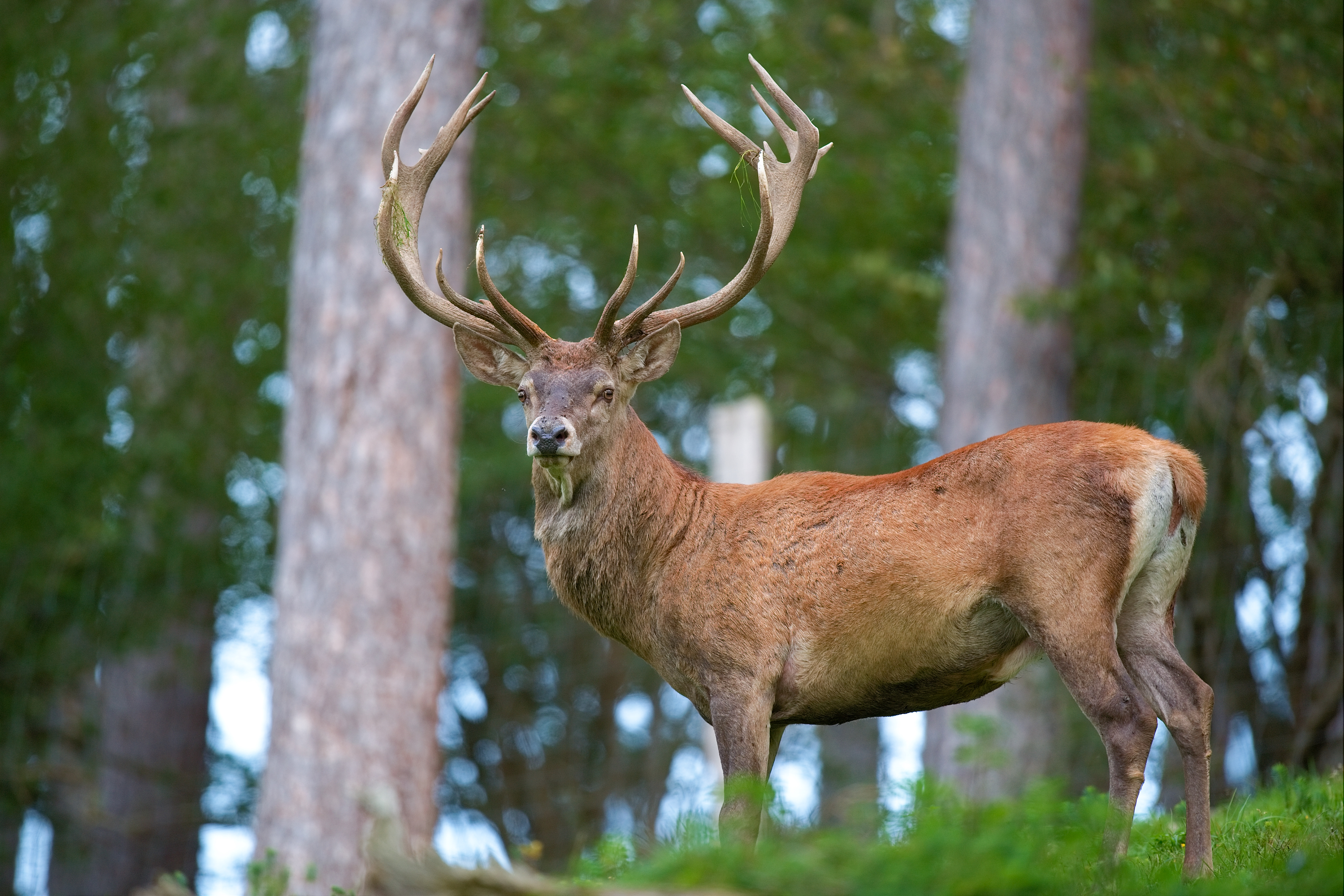
  - A living Cervus elaphus, or red deer
    †Cervus elaphus
- Ceutorhynchus
  - †Ceutorhynchus blaisdelli – type locality for species
  - †Ceutorhynchus clausus – type locality for species
  - †Ceutorhynchus compactus – type locality for species
  - †Ceutorhynchus degravatus – type locality for species
  - †Ceutorhynchus duratus – type locality for species
  - †Ceutorhynchus irvingi – type locality for species
- Chaetodipus
  - †Chaetodipus hispidus
- †Chaetopleurophora
  - †Chaetopleurophora laminarum – type locality for species
- †Chaetoptelea
  - †Chaetoptelea microphylla
- †Chalcis
  - †Chalcis perdita – type locality for species
  - †Chalcis praevalens
  - †Chalcis praevolans – type locality for species
  - †Chalcis tortilis – type locality for species
- †Chalepus
  - †Chalepus americanus – type locality for species
- †Chalybion
  - †Chalybion mortuum – type locality for species
- †Chamaecyparis
  - †Chamaecyparis linguaefolia
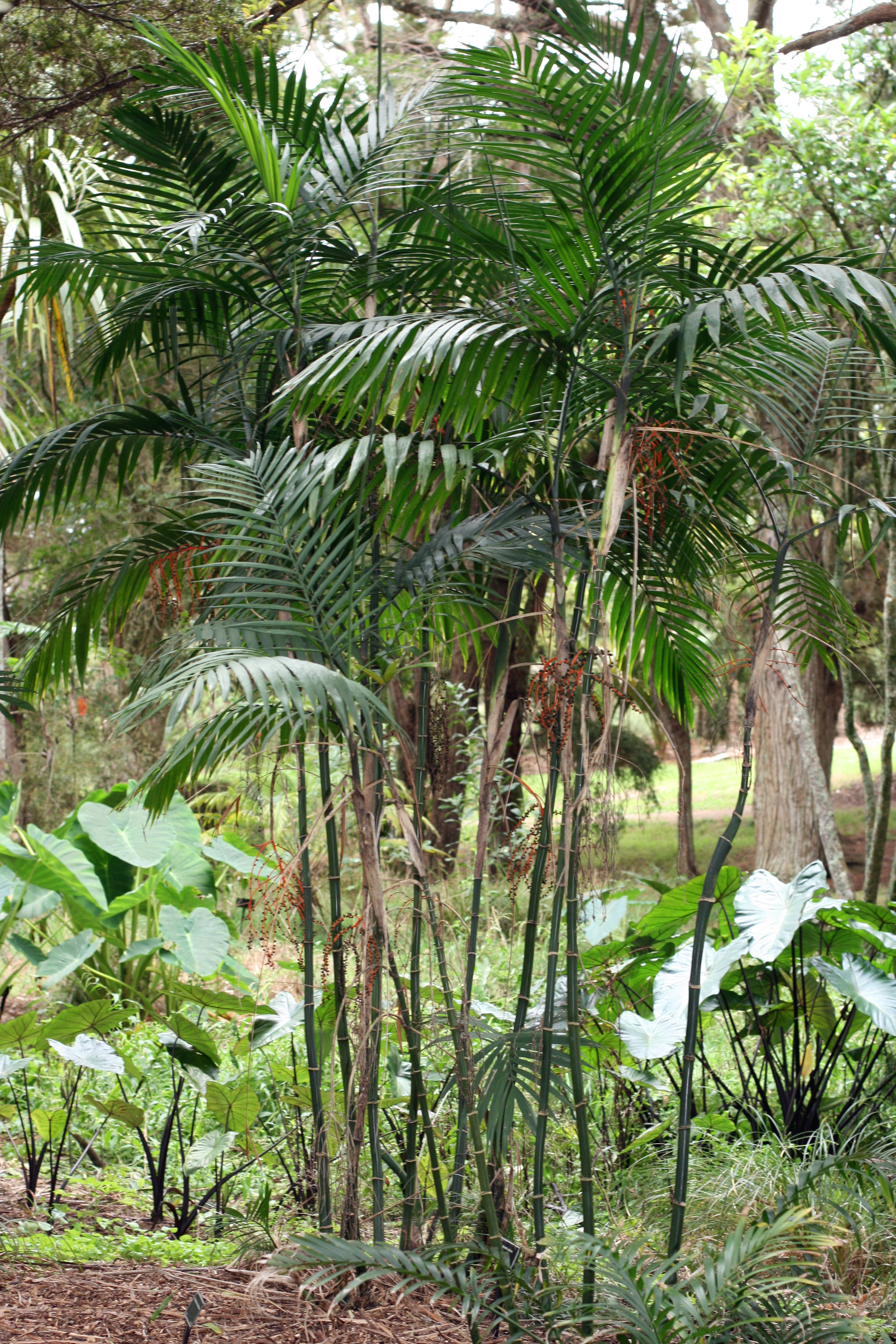
- A stand of living Chamaedorea palms
  †Chamaedorea
  - †Chamaedorea danae
- †Chaneya
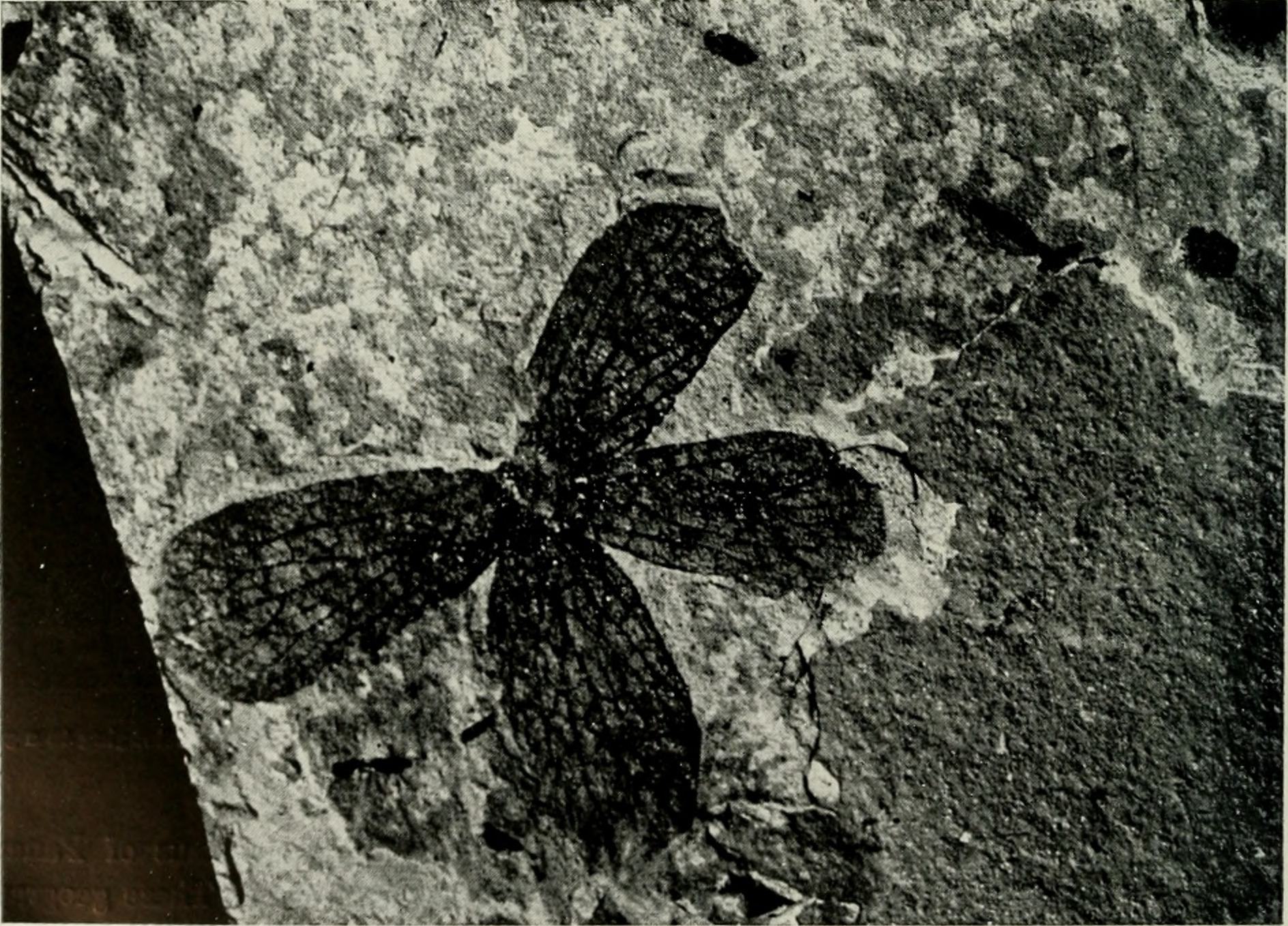
  - †Chaneya tenuis
    †Chaneya tenuis
- Charina
  - †Charina prebottae
- †Chauliognathus
  - †Chauliognathus pristinus – type locality for species
- †Cheilophis – type locality for genus
  - †Cheilophis huerfanoensis – type locality for species
- Cheilosia
  - †Cheilosia hecate – type locality for species
  - †Cheilosia miocenica – type locality for species
  - †Cheilosia scudderi – type locality for species
  - †Cheilosia sepultula – type locality for species
- †Chelonarium
  - †Chelonarium montanum – type locality for species
- †Chelonus
  - †Chelonus depressus – type locality for species
  - †Chelonus muratus – type locality for species
  - †Chelonus solidus – type locality for species
- †Chilocorus
  - †Chilocorus ulkei – type locality for species
- †Chionaemopsis – type locality for genus
  - †Chionaemopsis quadrifasciatus – type locality for species
- †Chiromyoides
  - †Chiromyoides caesor
  - †Chiromyoides gigas
  - †Chiromyoides potior – type locality for species
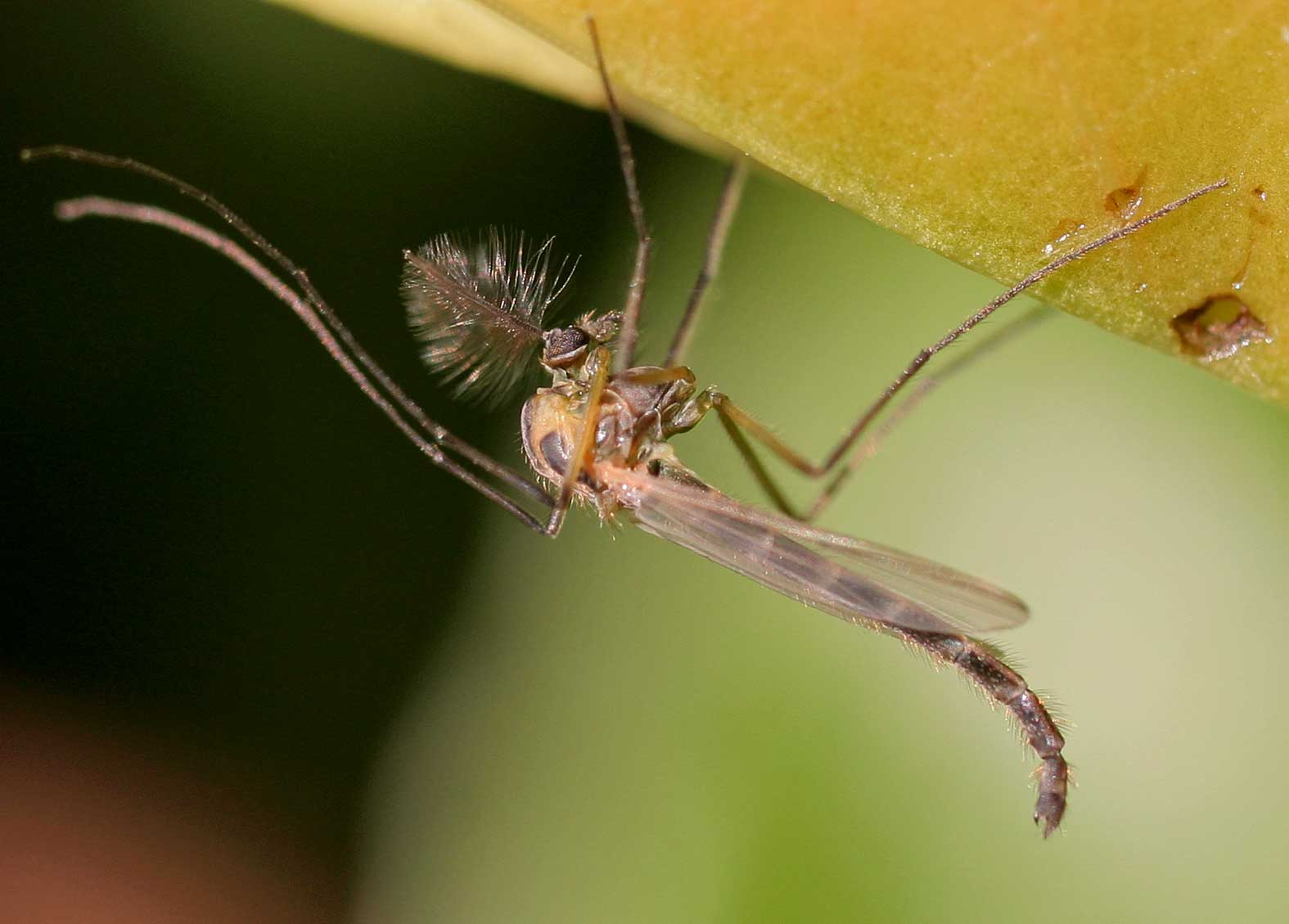
- A living Chironomus midge
  Chironomus
  - †Chironomus almelanderi – type locality for species
  - †Chironomus depletus – type locality for species
  - †Chironomus patens – type locality for species
  - †Chironomus pausatus – type locality for species
  - †Chironomus primaevus – type locality for species
  - †Chironomus pristinus – type locality for species
  - †Chironomus proterus – type locality for species
  - †Chironomus requiescens – type locality for species
  - †Chironomus scudderiellus – type locality for species
- Chondestes
  - †Chondestes grammacus
- †Chriacus
  - †Chriacus gallinae
- †Chrysis
  - †Chrysis miocenica – type locality for species
  - †Chrysis rohweri – type locality for species
- †Chrysobothris
  - †Chrysobothris coloradensis – type locality for species
  - †Chrysobothris gahani – type locality for species
  - †Chrysobothris haydeni – type locality for species
  - †Chrysobothris suppressa – type locality for species
- †Chrysogaster
  - †Chrysogaster antiquarius – type locality for species
- Chrysomela
  - †Chrysomela vesperalis – type locality for species
- †Cicada
  - †Cicada grandiosa – type locality for species
- †Cicadella
  - †Cicadella scudderi – type locality for species
- †Cimbex
  - †Cimbex vetusculus – type locality for species
- †Cimexomys
  - †Cimexomys arapahoensis – type locality for species
  - †Cimexomys minor
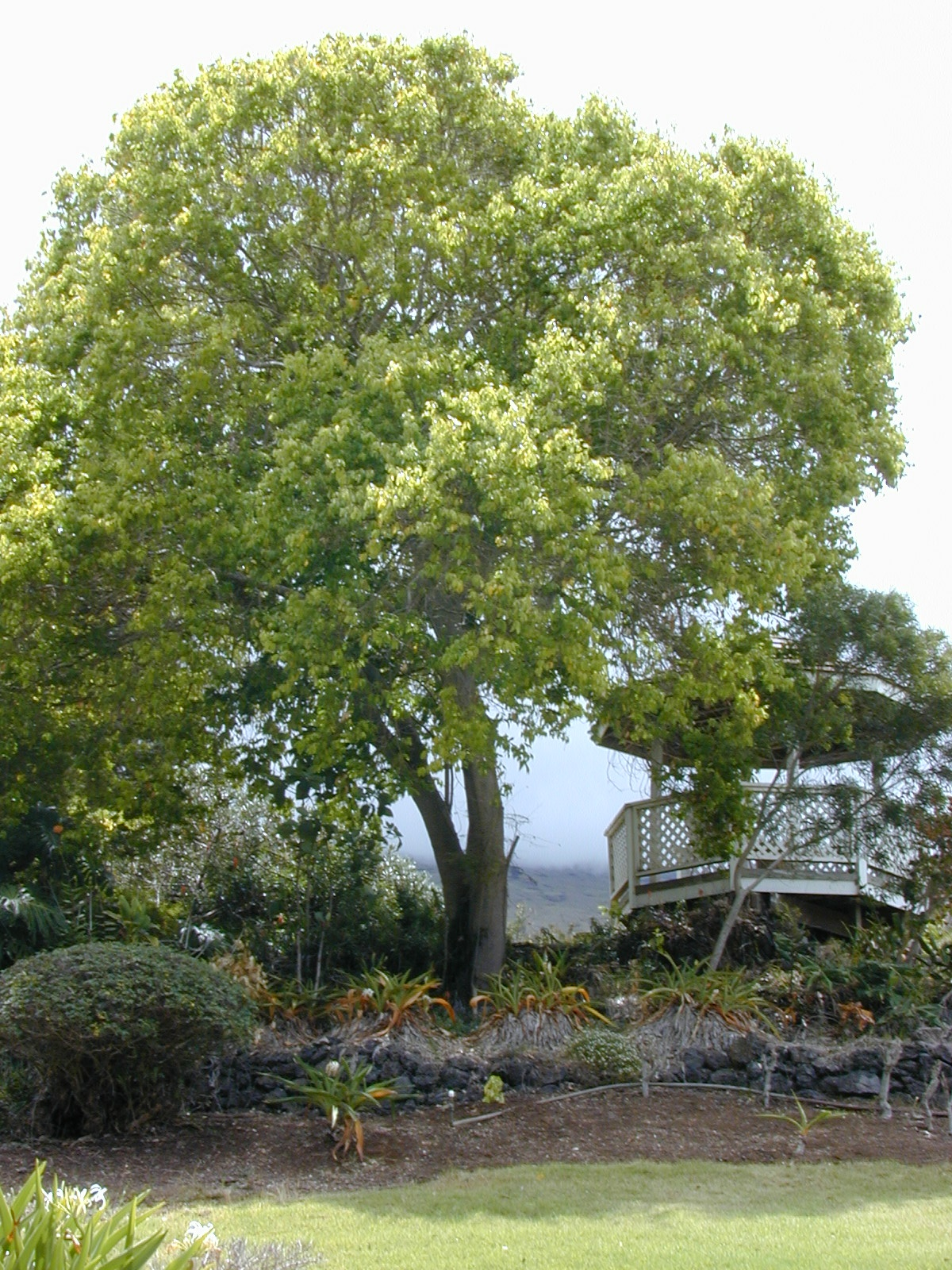
- A living Cinnamomum, or cinnamon tree
  Cinnamomum
  - †Cinnamomum sezannense
- †Cissites
  - †Cissites rocklandensis
- Cissus
  - †Cissus marginata
- †Cixius – tentative report
  - †Cixius proavus – type locality for species
- †Cladius
  - †Cladius petrinus – type locality for species
- †Cladoneura – type locality for genus
  - †Cladoneura willistoni – type locality for species
- †Cladura
  - †Cladura integra – type locality for species
  - †Cladura maculata – type locality for species
- †Clastoptera
  - †Clastoptera comstocki – type locality for species
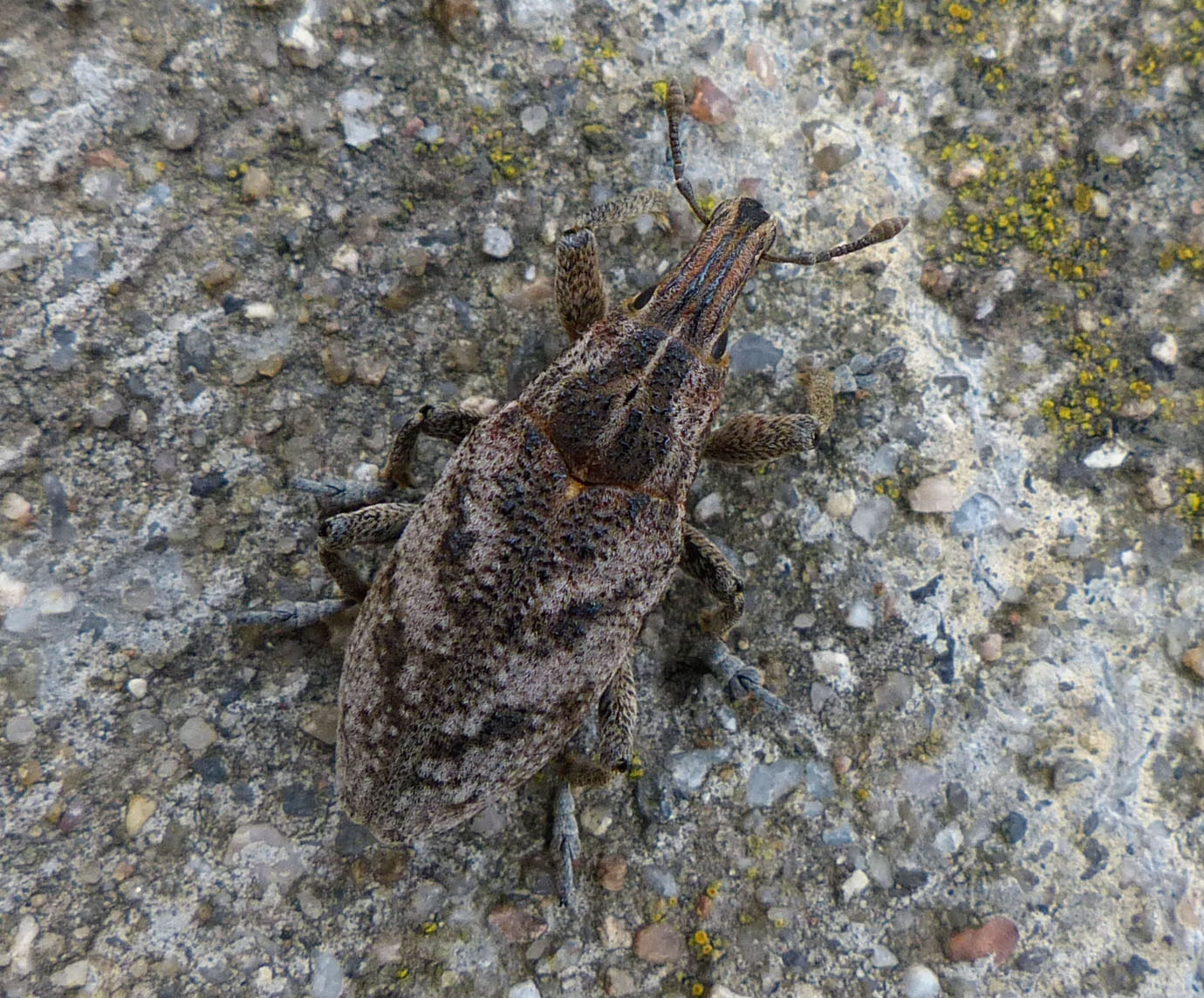
- A living Cleonus weevil
  †Cleonus
  - †Cleonus degeneratus – type locality for species
  - †Cleonus estriatus – type locality for species
  - †Cleonus exterraneus – type locality for species
  - †Cleonus foersteri – type locality for species
  - †Cleonus primoris – type locality for species
  - †Cleonus rohweri – type locality for species
- †Closterocoris
  - †Closterocoris elegans – type locality for species
- †Clubiona
  - †Clubiona arcana
  - †Clubiona curvispinosa – type locality for species
  - †Clubiona eversa – type locality for species
  - †Clubiona florissanti – type locality for species
- †Clytus
  - †Clytus pervetustus – type locality for species
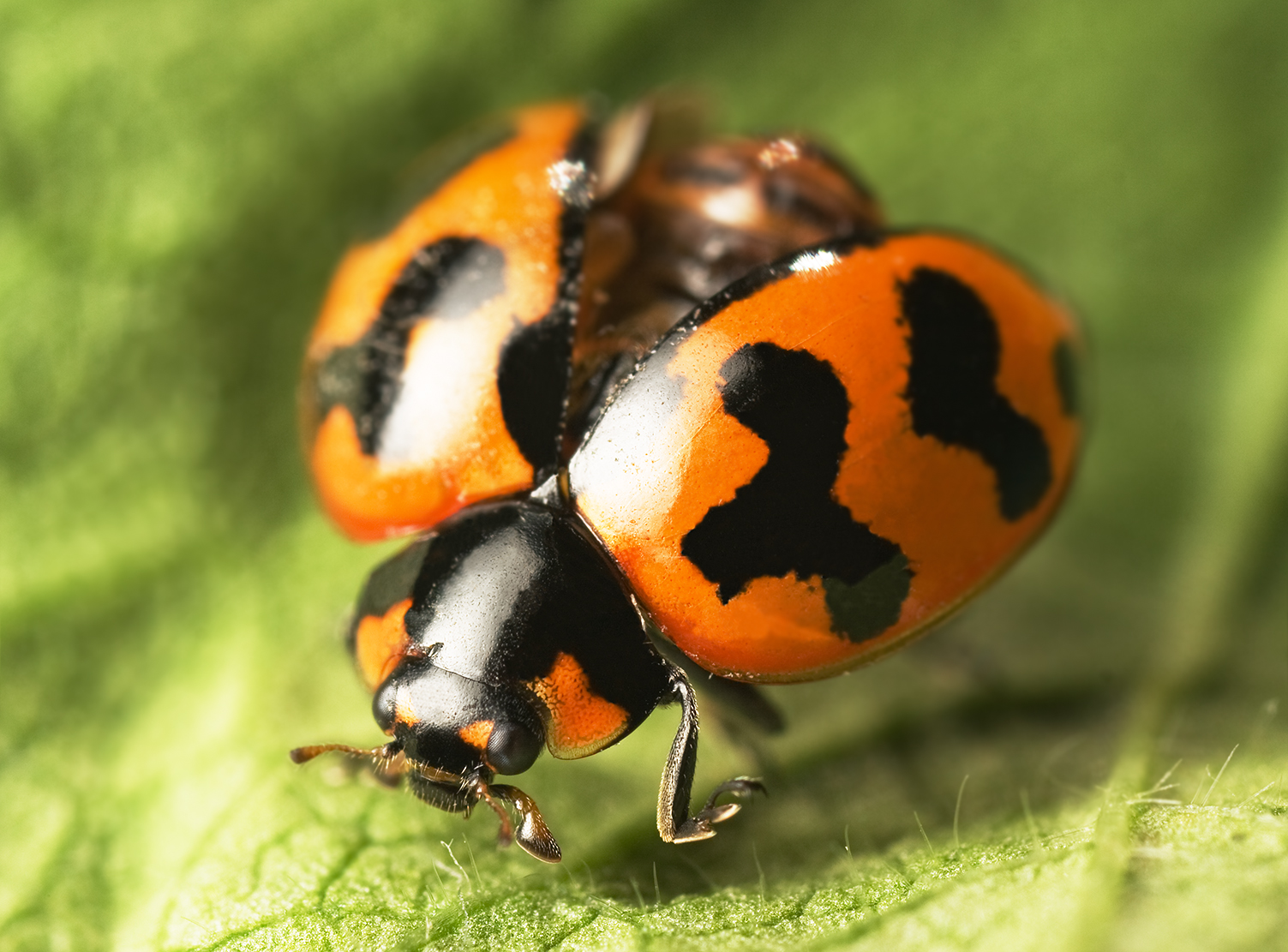
- A living Coccinella ladybug
  †Coccinella
  - †Coccinella florissantensis – type locality for species
  - †Coccinella sodoma – type locality for species
- †Coccotorus
  - †Coccotorus principalis – type locality for species
  - †Coccotorus requiescens – type locality for species
- †Coeliodes
  - †Coeliodes primotinus – type locality for species
- Colaptes
  - †Colaptes auratus
- †Colaspis
  - †Colaspis aetatis – type locality for species
  - †Colaspis diluvialis – type locality for species
  - †Colaspis proserpina – type locality for species
- †Colastes
  - †Colastes abrogatus – type locality for species
- †Colemanus – type locality for genus
  - †Colemanus keeleyorum – type locality for species
- †Collops
  - †Collops desuetus – type locality for species
  - †Collops extrusus – type locality for species
  - †Collops priscus – type locality for species
- †Colopterus
  - †Colopterus pygidialis – type locality for species
- †Colpoclaenus
  - †Colpoclaenus keeferi
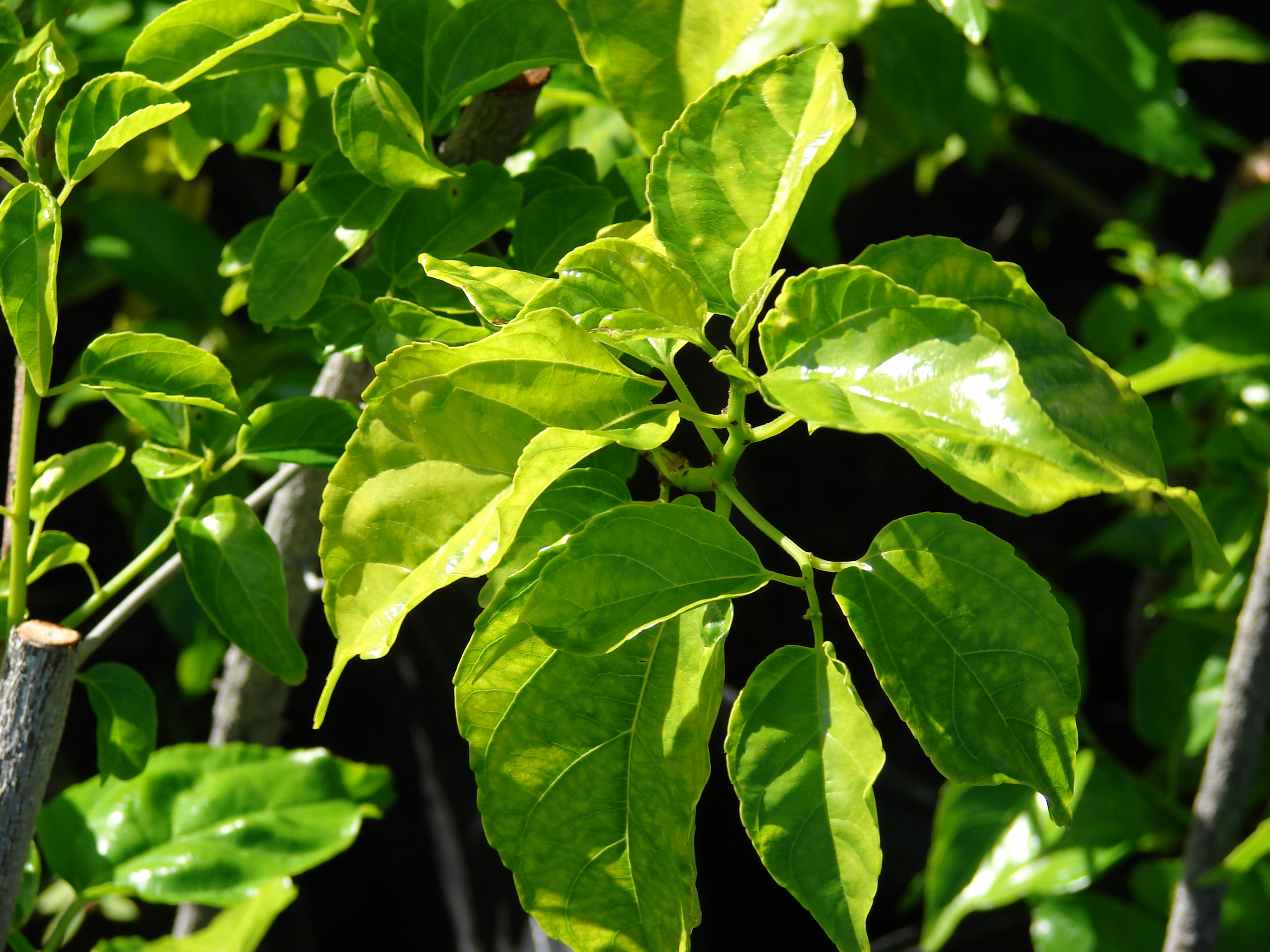
- A living member of Colubrina
  †Colubrina
  - †Colubrina spireaefolia
  - †Colubrina spireafollia
- †Compsemys
  - †Compsemys victa
- †Comptosia – type locality for genus
  - †Comptosia miranda – type locality for species
- †Conacodon
  - †Conacodon delphae – type locality for species
  - †Conacodon harbourae – type locality for species
  - †Conacodon matthewi – type locality for species
- †Coniatus
  - †Coniatus refractus
- Conotelus
  - †Conotelus obscurus
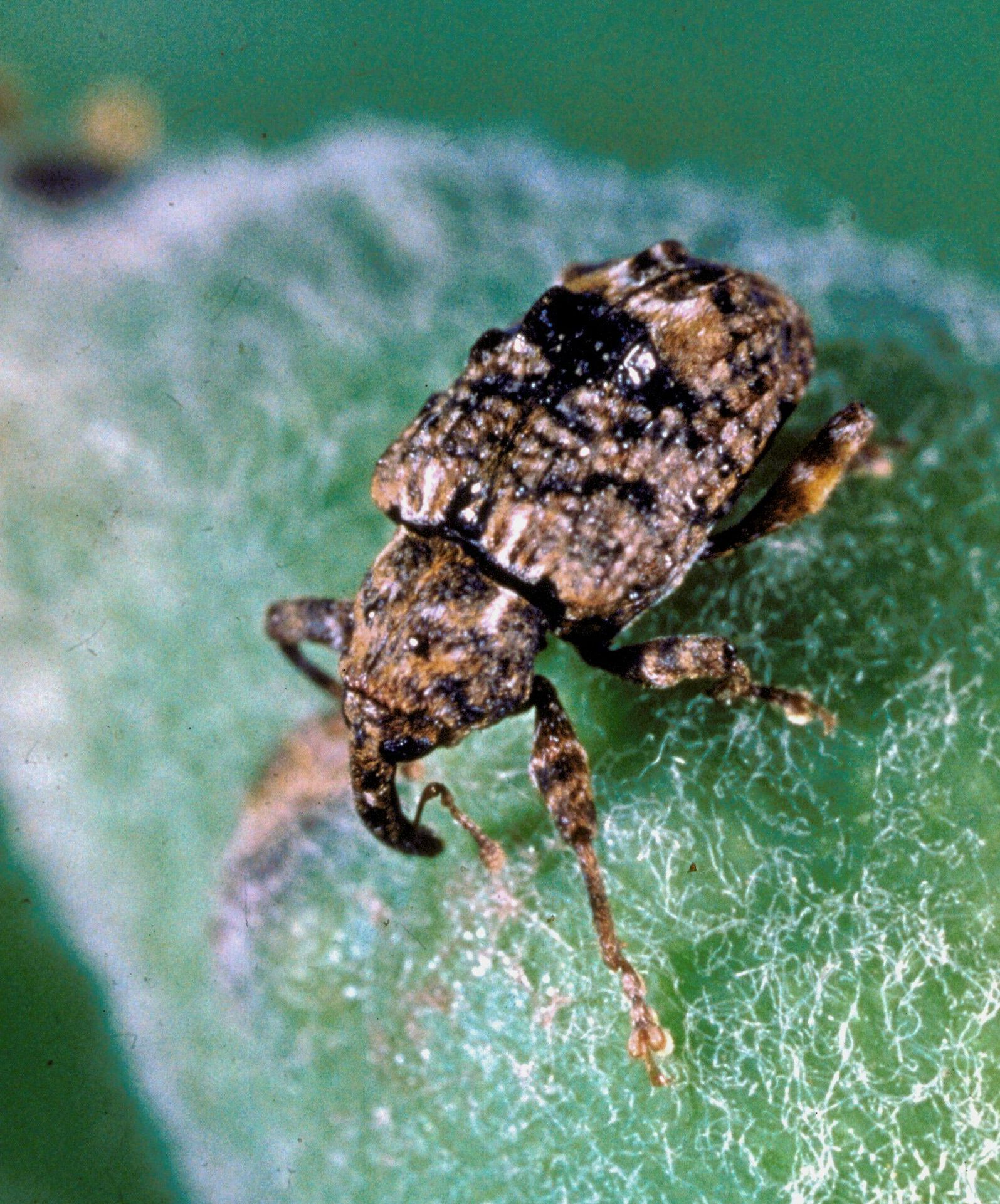
- A living Conotrachelus weevil
  †Conotrachelus
  - †Conotrachelus florissantensis – type locality for species
- †Contogenys – or unidentified related form
- †Convolvulites
  - †Convolvulites orichitus
- †Conzattia
  - †Conzattia coriacea – type locality for species
- †Copecion
  - †Copecion brachypternus
- †Copelemur
  - †Copelemur praetutus
- †Cophocoris – type locality for genus
  - †Cophocoris tenebricosus – type locality for species
- †Cophura
  - †Cophura antiquella – type locality for species
- †Copidita
  - †Copidita miocenica – type locality for species
- †Coptochromus – type locality for genus
  - †Coptochromus manium – type locality for species
- †Cordilura
  - †Cordilura exhumata – type locality for species
- †Corethra
  - †Corethra exita – type locality for species
- Corixa
  - †Corixa immersa – type locality for species
  - †Corixa vanduzeei – type locality for species
- †Corizus
  - †Corizus abditivus – type locality for species
  - †Corizus celatus – type locality for species
  - †Corizus somnurnus – type locality for species
- †Cormocyon
  - †Cormocyon copei
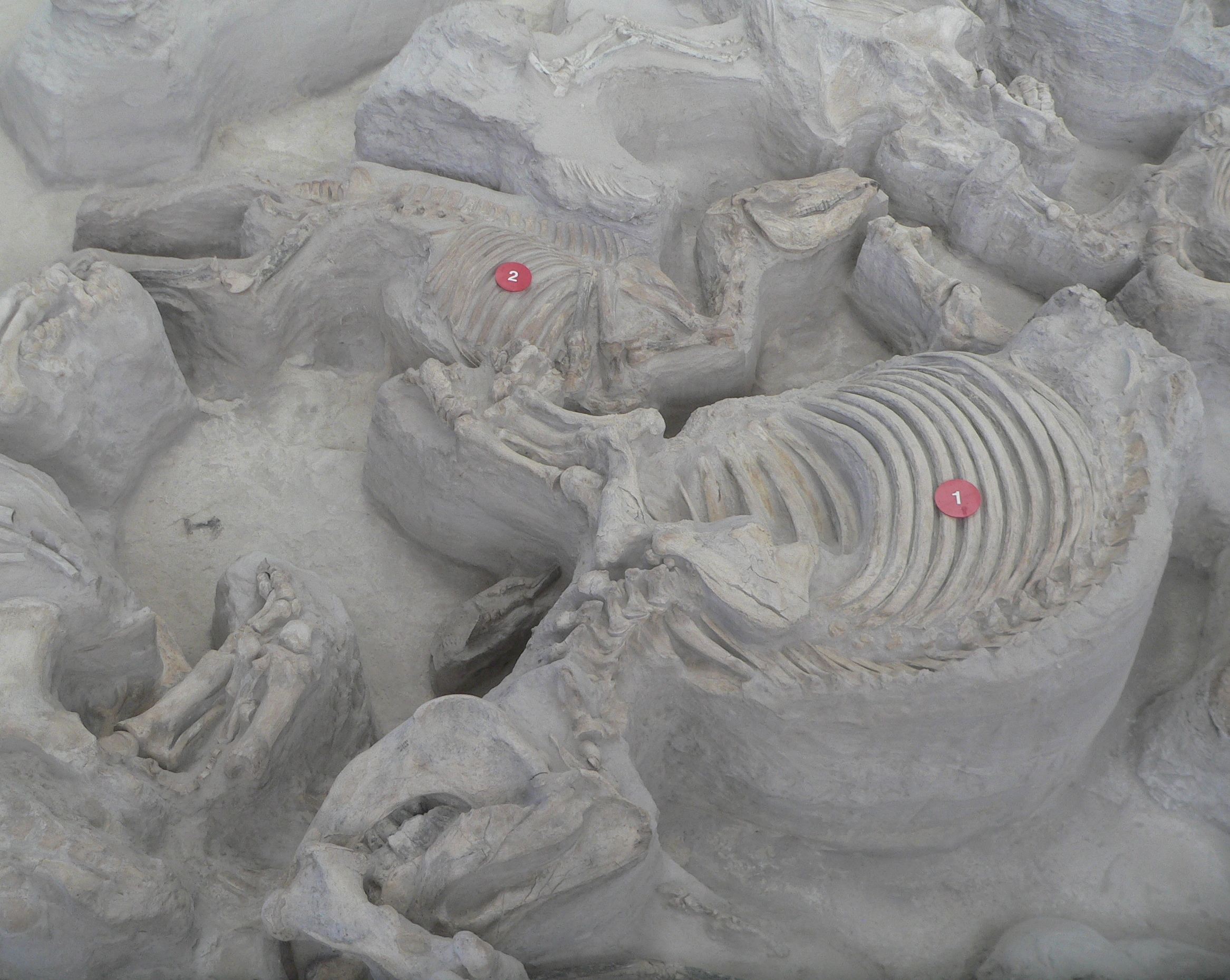
- Fossilized skeleton preserved in situ (upper left, 2) of the Miocene-Pliocene horse Cormohipparion
  †Cormohipparion
  - †Cormohipparion quinni
  - †Cormohipparion sphenodus
- Cornus
  - †Cornus hyperborea
- †Corphyra
  - †Corphyra calypso – type locality for species
- Corticaria
  - †Corticaria aeterna – type locality for species
  - †Corticaria egregia – type locality for species
  - †Corticaria occlusa – type locality for species
  - †Corticaria petrefacta – type locality for species
- Corvus
  - †Corvus brachyrhynchos
  - †Corvus corax
- †Corylus
  - †Corylus insignis
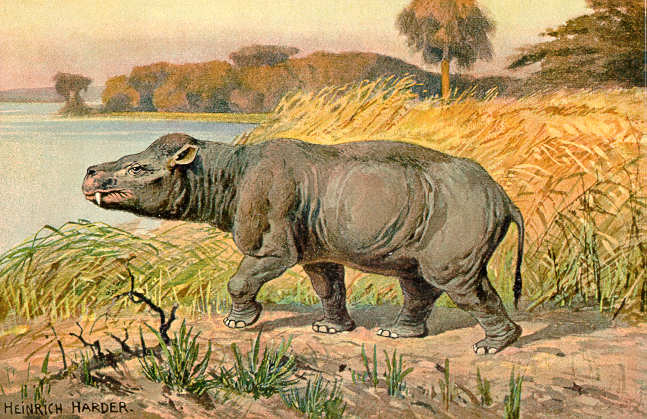
- Life restoration of the Paleocene-Eocene pantodont mammal Coryphodon. Heinrich Harder (1920).
  †Coryphodon
  - †Coryphodon armatus
  - †Coryphodon eocaenus
- Cossonus
  - †Cossonus gabbii – type locality for species
  - †Cossonus rutus – type locality for species
- †Cotinus
  - †Cotinus fraterna
- †Crabro
  - †Crabro longaevus – type locality for species
- †Cratacanthus
  - †Cratacanthus florissantensis – type locality for species
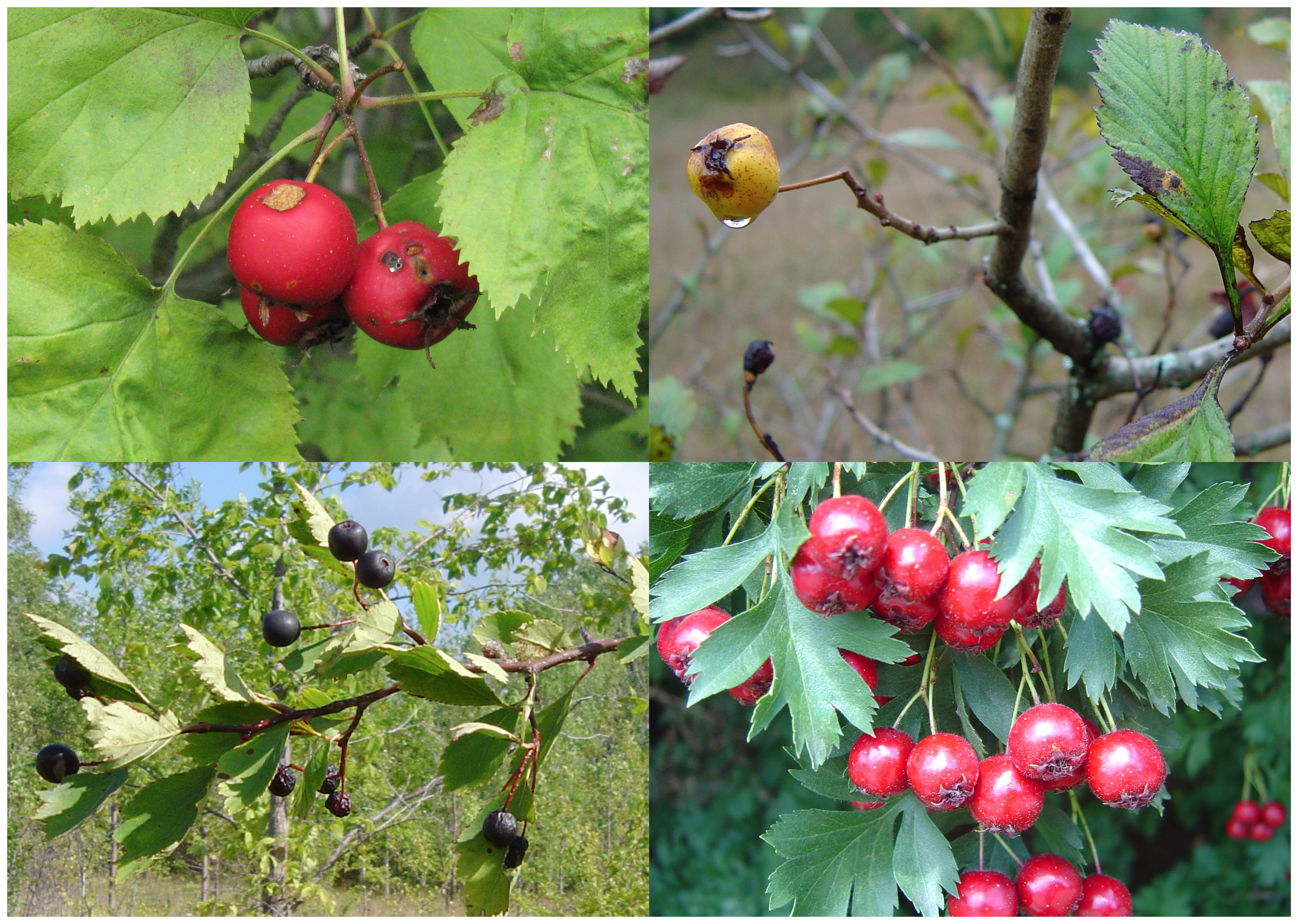
- Fruit of four difference species of Crataegus, or hawthorn tree
  Crataegus
  - †Crataegus copeana
  - †Crataegus hendersoni
  - †Crataegus nupta
- †Cremastorhynchus
  - †Cremastorhynchus stabilis
- †Cremastosaurus – type locality for genus
  - †Cremastosaurus carinicollis – type locality for species
  - †Cremastosaurus rhambastes – type locality for species
- †Cremnops
  - †Cremnops florissanticola – type locality for species
- †Creniphilites – type locality for genus
  - †Creniphilites orpheus – type locality for species
- †Crioceridea – type locality for genus
  - †Crioceridea dubia – type locality for species
- Crotalus
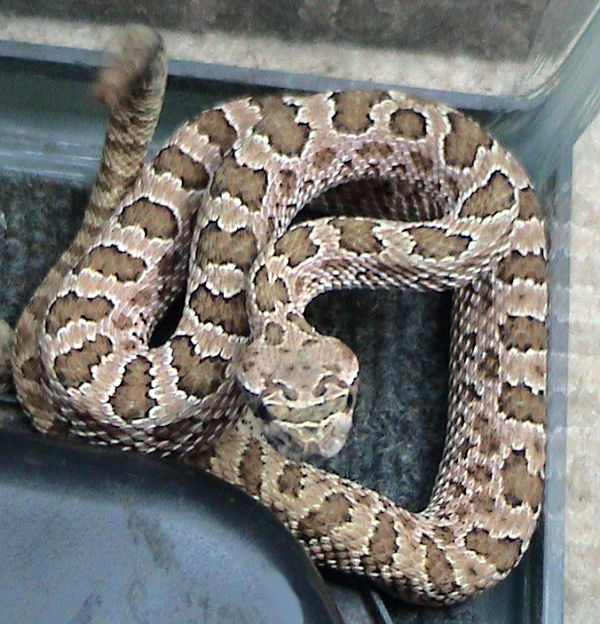
  - A living Crotalus viridis, or prairie rattlesnake
    †Crotalus viridis
- †Croton
  - †Croton furculatum
- †Cryptagriotes – type locality for genus
  - †Cryptagriotes minusculus – type locality for species
- †Cryptocephalus
  - †Cryptocephalus miocenus – type locality for species
- †Cryptocheilus
  - †Cryptocheilus florissantensis – type locality for species
  - †Cryptocheilus hypogaeus – type locality for species
  - †Cryptocheilus laminarum – type locality for species
  - †Cryptocheilus scudderi – type locality for species
  - †Cryptocheilus senex – type locality for species
- †Cryptochromus – type locality for genus
  - †Cryptochromus letatus – type locality for species
- Cryptohypnus
  - †Cryptohypnus exterminatus – type locality for species
  - †Cryptohypnus hesperus – type locality for species
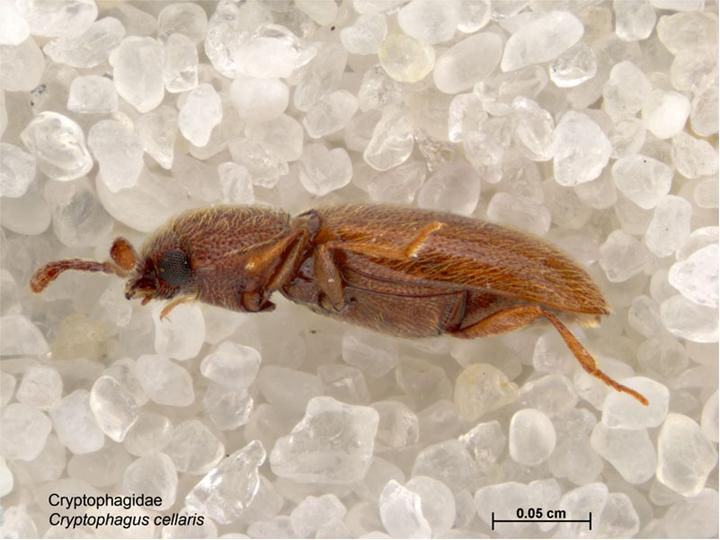
- A living Cryptophagus silken fungus beetle
  Cryptophagus
  - †Cryptophagus bassleri – type locality for species
  - †Cryptophagus petricola – type locality for species
  - †Cryptophagus scudderi – type locality for species
- Cryptorhynchus
  - †Cryptorhynchus annosus
  - †Cryptorhynchus coloradensis – type locality for species
  - †Cryptorhynchus durus – type locality for species
  - †Cryptorhynchus evinctus – type locality for species
  - †Cryptorhynchus fallii – type locality for species
  - †Cryptorhynchus kerri – type locality for species
  - †Cryptorhynchus profusus – type locality for species
- †Cryptus
  - †Cryptus delineatus – type locality for species
- †Ctereacoris – type locality for genus
  - †Ctereacoris primigenus – type locality for species
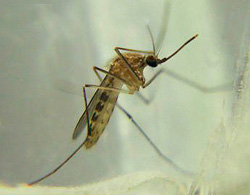
- A living Culex mosquito
  Culex
  - †Culex winchesteri – type locality for species
- †Curculio
  - †Curculio anicularis – type locality for species
  - †Curculio beeklyi – type locality for species
  - †Curculio curvirostris – type locality for species
  - †Curculio duttoni – type locality for species
  - †Curculio extinctus – type locality for species
  - †Curculio femoratus
  - †Curculio flexirostris – type locality for species
  - †Curculio florissantensis – type locality for species
  - †Curculio minusculoides – type locality for species
  - †Curculio minusculus
  - †Curculio restrictus – type locality for species
- †Cursoricoccyx – type locality for genus
  - †Cursoricoccyx geraldinae – type locality for species
- †Cuterebra
  - †Cuterebra ascarides – type locality for species
  - †Cuterebra bibosa – type locality for species
- †Cychramites – type locality for genus
  - †Cychramites hirtus – type locality for species
- †Cyclotrachelus
  - †Cyclotrachelus tenebricus – type locality for species
- †Cydamus
  - †Cydamus robustus – type locality for species
- †Cydnopsis
  - †Cydnopsis handlirschi – type locality for species
- †Cylindrodon
  - †Cylindrodon nebraskensis
- †Cylindrotoma
  - †Cylindrotoma veterana – type locality for species
- †Cynarctoides
  - †Cynarctoides acridens
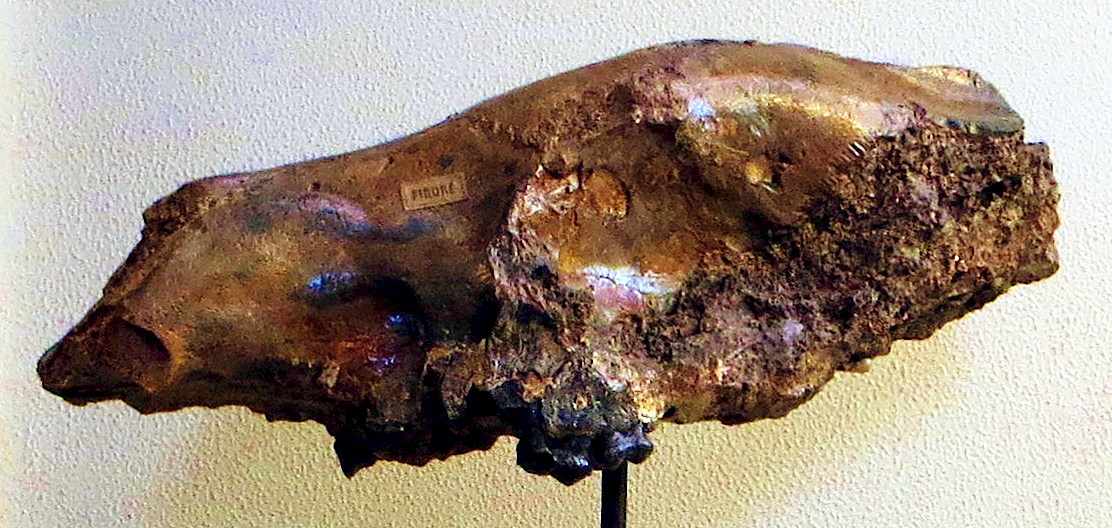
- Fossilized cranium of the Miocene bear-dog Cynelos
  †Cynelos
- Cynomys
  - †Cynomys niobrarius
  - †Cynomys spenceri – or unidentified comparable form
- †Cyperacites
  - †Cyperacites lacustris – type locality for species
- †Cyphomyia
  - †Cyphomyia rohweri – type locality for species
- Cyphon
- †Cyphus
  - †Cyphus florissantensis – type locality for species
- †Cypris
  - †Cypris florissantensis – type locality for species
- †Cyrtapis – type locality for genus
  - †Cyrtapis anomala – type locality for species
- †Cyrtomon
  - †Cyrtomon subterraneus – type locality for species
- Cytilus
  - †Cytilus tartarinus – type locality for species
- †Cyttaromyia
  - †Cyttaromyia obdurescens – type locality for species
  - †Cyttaromyia princetoniana – type locality for species
  - †Cyttaromyia reclusa – type locality for species

== D ==
- †Daphne
  - †Daphne septentrionalis
- Daphnia
- Life restoration of the Eocene-Miocene bear dog Daphoenus
  †Daphoenus
  - †Daphoenus vetus
- †Dartonius
  - †Dartonius jepseni
- †Dascillus
  - †Dascillus lithographicus – type locality for species
- †Davidia
  - †Davidia antiqua
- †Deleaster
  - †Deleaster grandiceps – type locality for species
- †Delphax
  - †Delphax senilis – type locality for species
  - †Delphax veterum – type locality for species
- †Demophorus
  - †Demophorus antiquus – type locality for species
- †Denaeaspis – type locality for genus
  - †Denaeaspis chelonopsis – type locality for species
- †Dendragopus
  - †Dendragopus obscurus
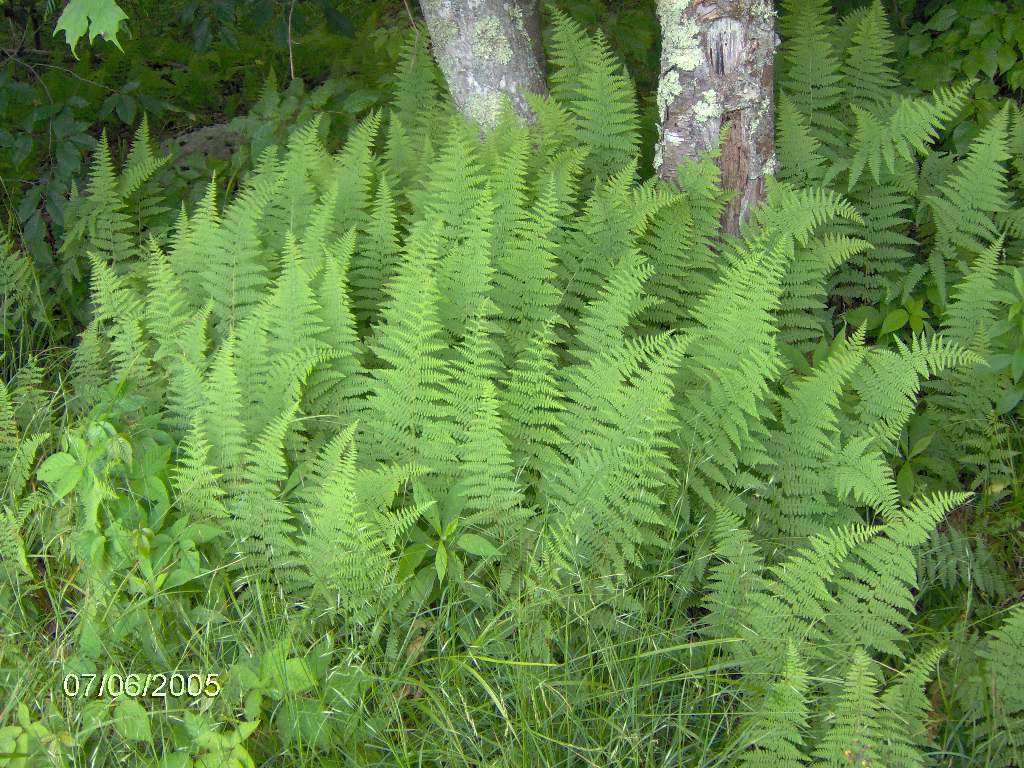
- Living Dennstaedtia, or hayscented ferns
  †Dennstaedtia
  - †Dennstaedtia americana
- †Denverus – type locality for genus
  - †Denverus middletoni – type locality for species
- †Dermatobia
  - †Dermatobia hydropica – type locality for species
- †Dermestes
  - †Dermestes tertiarius – type locality for species
- †Derobrochus – type locality for genus
  - †Derobrochus abstractus – type locality for species
  - †Derobrochus caenulentus – type locality for species
  - †Derobrochus commoratus – type locality for species
  - †Derobrochus craterae – type locality for species
  - †Derobrochus frigescens – type locality for species
  - †Derobrochus marcidus – type locality for species
  - †Derobrochus typharum – type locality for species
- †Desmatoclaenus
  - †Desmatoclaenus protogonioides – or unidentified comparable form
- †Desmatomyia – type locality for genus
  - †Desmatomyia scopulicornis – type locality for species
- †Detyopsis – type locality for genus
  - †Detyopsis packardi – type locality for species
  - †Detyopsis scudderi – type locality for species
- †Deviacer
- †Diabrotica
  - †Diabrotica bowditchiana – type locality for species
  - †Diabrotica exesa – type locality for species
  - †Diabrotica florissantella – type locality for species
  - †Diabrotica uteana – type locality for species
- †Diacodexis
  - †Diacodexis kelleyi
  - †Diacodexis metsiacus – or unidentified comparable form
  - †Diacodexis minutus
  - †Diacodexis primus
  - †Diacodexis secans – or unidentified comparable form
- †Diacodon
  - †Diacodon alticuspis – or unidentified comparable form
- †Dialysis
  - †Dialysis revelata – type locality for species
- Dialytes
- Dialytodius
  - †Dialytodius decipiens
- Diamesa
  - †Diamesa extincta – type locality for species
- †Dianthidium
  - †Dianthidium tertiarium – type locality for species
- †Diaplegma – type locality for genus
  - †Diaplegma abductum – type locality for species
  - †Diaplegma haldemani – type locality for species
  - †Diaplegma occultorum – type locality for species
  - †Diaplegma ruinosum – type locality for species
  - †Diaplegma venerabile – type locality for species
  - †Diaplegma veterascens – type locality for species
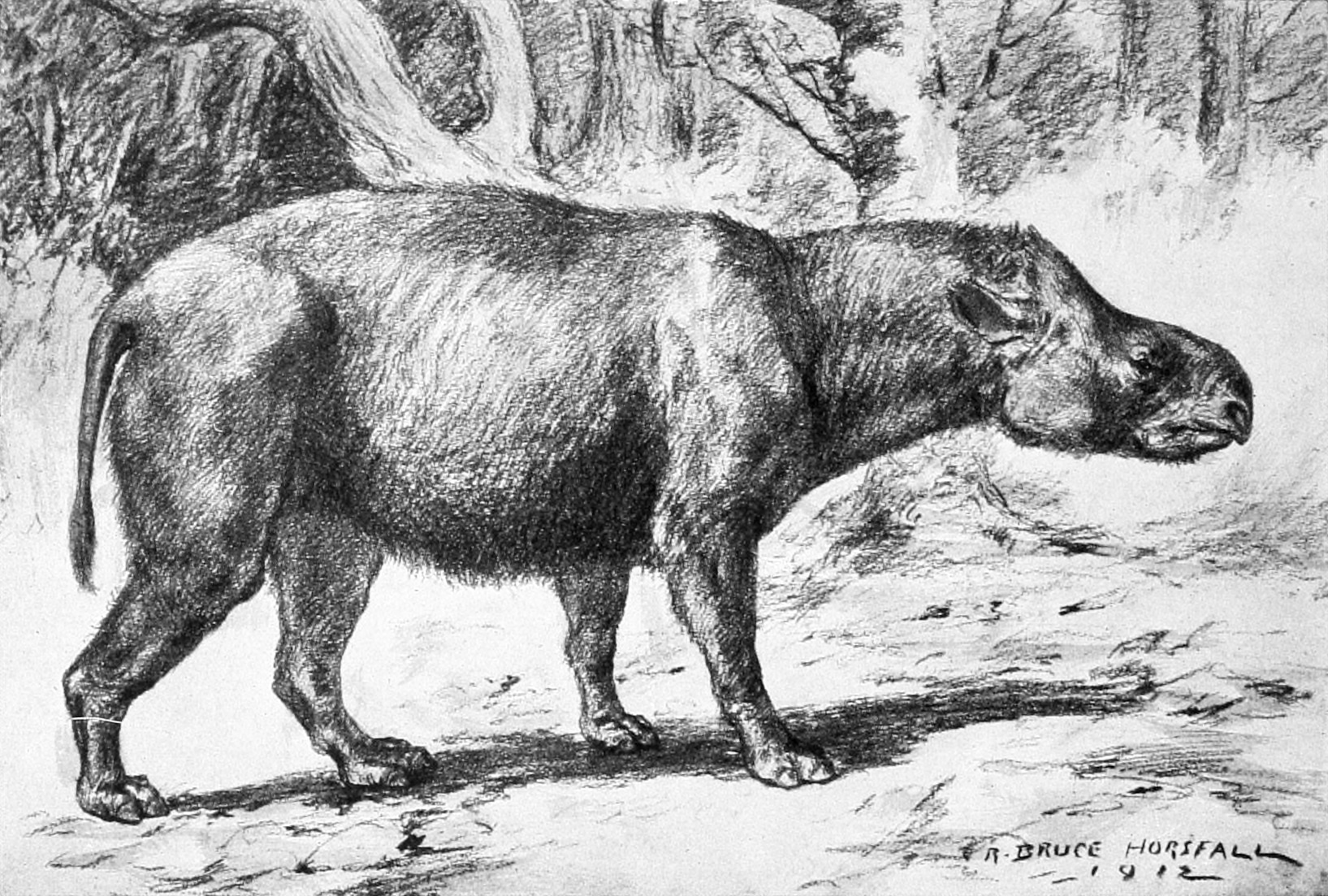
- Restoration of the Oligocene-Miocene hornless rhinoceros Diceratherium. Robert Bruce Horsfall (1913).
  †Diceratherium
  - †Diceratherium tridactylum
- †Dicerca
  - †Dicerca eurydice – type locality for species
- Dicranomyia
  - †Dicranomyia faecarius – type locality for species
  - †Dicranomyia fontainei – type locality for species
  - †Dicranomyia fragilis – type locality for species
  - †Dicranomyia inferna – type locality for species
  - †Dicranomyia loewi – type locality for species
  - †Dicranomyia longipes – type locality for species
  - †Dicranomyia primitiva
  - †Dicranomyia rohweri – type locality for species
  - †Dicranomyia saxetana – type locality for species
  - †Dicranomyia stagnorum
  - †Dicranomyia stigmosa
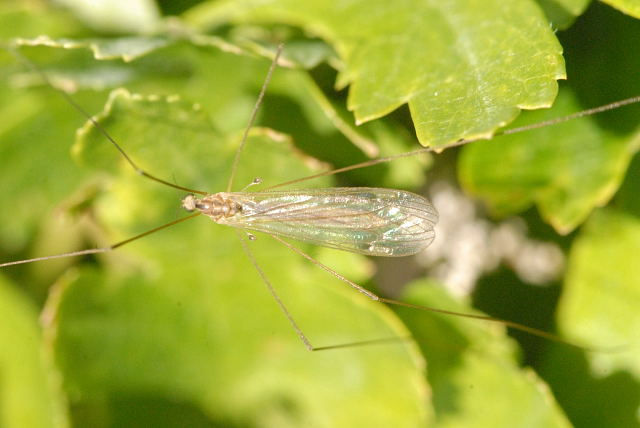
- A living Dicranota hairy-eyed cranefly
  †Dicranota
  - †Dicranota cockerelli – type locality for species
- †Dictyla
  - †Dictyla veterana – type locality for species
- †Dictyophara
  - †Dictyophara bouvei – type locality for species
- †Dictyoraphidia
  - †Dictyoraphidia veterana – type locality for species
- †Didelphodus
  - †Didelphodus absarokae
  - †Didelphodus altidens
- †Didymictis
  - †Didymictis altidens
  - †Didymictis leptomylus
  - †Didymictis protenus
  - †Didymictis proteus – or unidentified comparable form
  - †Didymictis vancleveae
- †Didymosphaeria
  - †Didymosphaeria betheli
- †Dikkomys
- †Dilaropsis – type locality for genus
  - †Dilaropsis ornatus – type locality for species
- †Dillenites
  - †Dillenites garfieldensis
- †Dilophodon
- †Dineura
  - †Dineura cockerelli – type locality for species
  - †Dineura fuscipennis – type locality for species
  - †Dineura laminarum – type locality for species
  - †Dineura microsoma – type locality for species
  - †Dineura saxorum – type locality for species
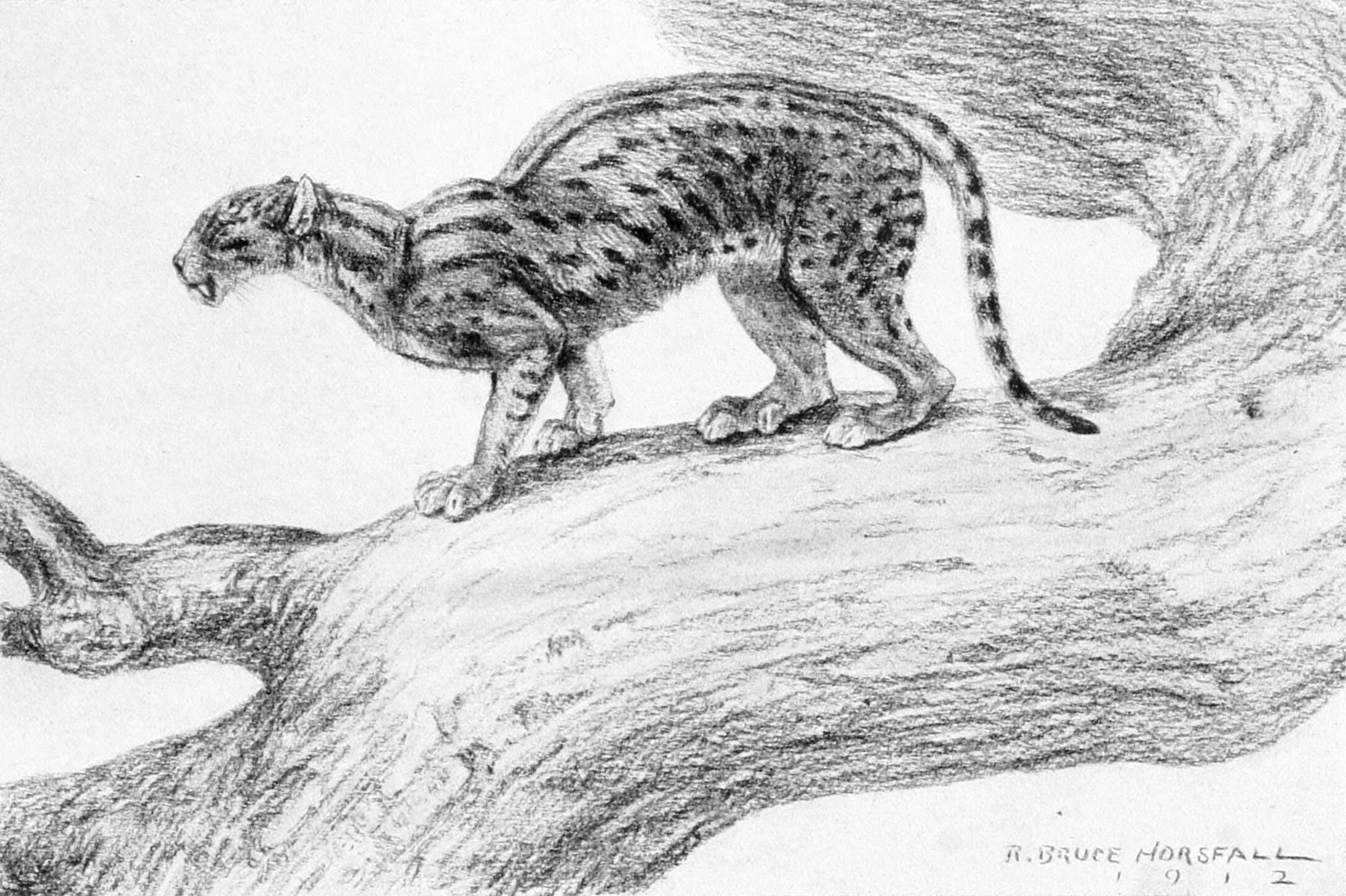
- Life restoration of the Eocene-Miocene false saber-toothed cat Dinictis. Robert Bruce Horsfall (1913).
  †Dinictis
- †Dinidorites – type locality for genus
  - †Dinidorites margiformis – type locality for species
- †Dinoderus
  - †Dinoderus cuneicollis – type locality for species
- †Dinohippus
  - †Dinohippus interpolatus – or unidentified comparable form
- †Dioctria
  - †Dioctria florissantina – type locality for species
  - †Dioctria pulveris – type locality for species
- Dioscorea
- †Diplodipelta – type locality for genus
  - †Diplodipelta reniptera
- †Diplolophus
  - †Diplolophus insolens
- †Diploptera
  - †Diploptera gemini – type locality for species
  - †Diploptera savba – type locality for species
  - †Diploptera vladimir – type locality for species
- Diplotaxis – tentative report
- Diplotaxis
  - †Diplotaxis aurora – type locality for species
  - †Diplotaxis simplicipes – type locality for species
- Dipodomys
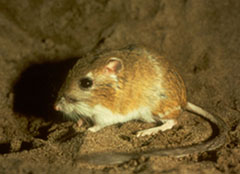
  - A living Dipodomys ordii, or Ord's kangaroo rat
    †Dipodomys ordii
- †Dipsalidictis
  - †Dipsalidictis transiens
- Dipteronia
  - †Dipteronia brownii
  - †Dipteronia insignis
- †Dissacus
  - †Dissacus navajovius
- †Docimus – type locality for genus
  - †Docimus psylloides – type locality for species
- †Docirhynchus
  - †Docirhynchus terebrans – type locality for species
- Dodonaea
  - †Dodonaea umbrina
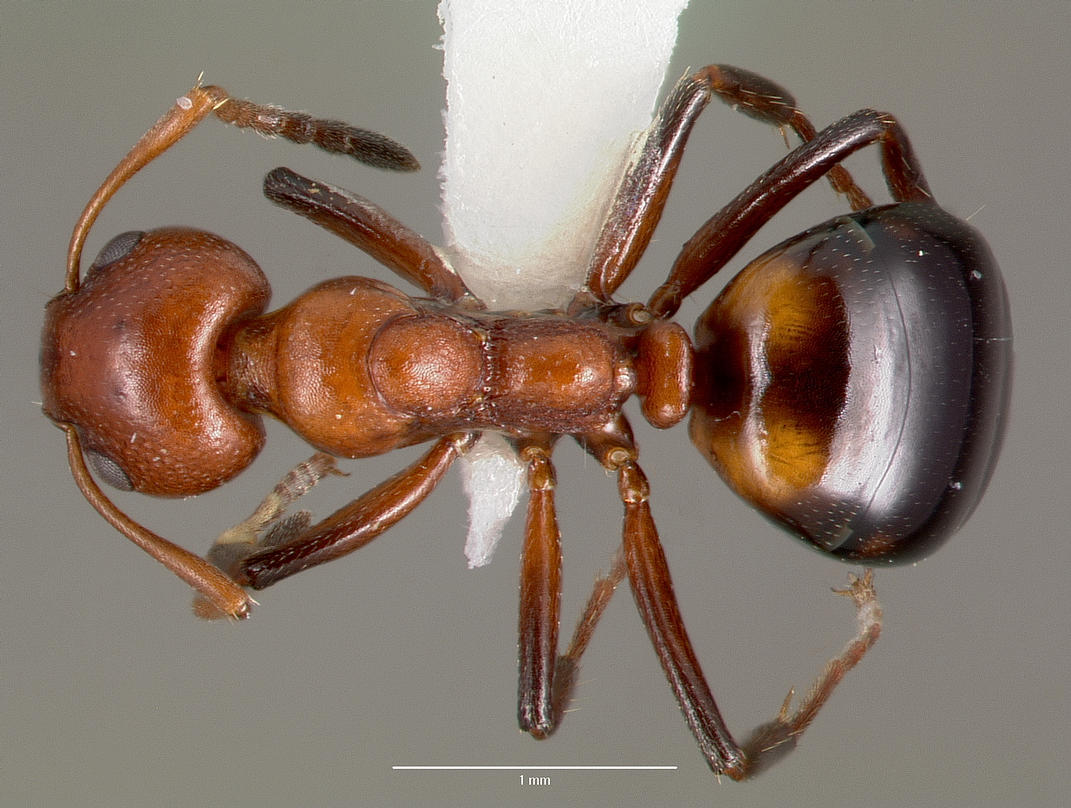
- Preserved Dolichoderus ant
  Dolichoderus
  - †Dolichoderus antiquus – type locality for species
  - †Dolichoderus kohlsi – type locality for species
  - †Dolichoderus rohweri – type locality for species
- †Dolichomyia
  - †Dolichomyia tertiaria – type locality for species
  - †Dolichomyia testea – type locality for species
- Dolurgus
  - †Dolurgus pumilus
- †Dombeyopsis
  - †Dombeyopsis magnifica
- †Dominickus – type locality for genus
  - †Dominickus castnioides – type locality for species
- †Domnina
  - †Domnina gradata
  - †Domnina thompsoni – or unidentified comparable form
- †Domninoides
- Donacia
- Dorytomus
  - †Dorytomus coercitus – type locality for species
  - †Dorytomus williamsi – type locality for species
- †Doxocopa
  - †Doxocopa wilmattae – type locality for species
- †Drassonax
  - †Drassonax harpagops – type locality for species
- †Drepanomeryx – tentative report
  - †Drepanomeryx falciformis
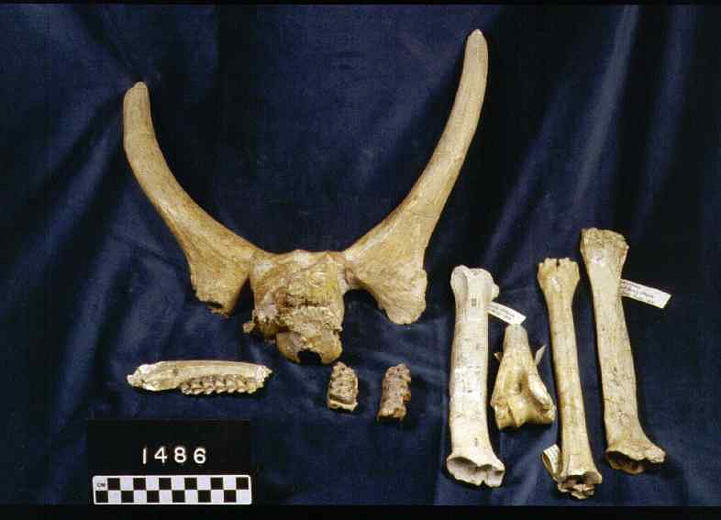
- Fossilized horns, jaws, and limb bones of the Miocene deer relative Dromomeryx
  †Dromomeryx
  - †Dromomeryx borealis – type locality for species
- †Dryobius
  - †Dryobius miocenicus – type locality for species
- Dryocoetes – type locality for genus
  - †Dryocoetes diluvialis – type locality for species
- Dryopteris
  - †Dryopteris guyottii
  - †Dryopteris lakesi
  - †Dryopteris serrata
- Dyschirius
- †Dyscoletes
  - †Dyscoletes soporatus – type locality for species
- †Dysdercus
  - †Dysdercus cinctus – type locality for species
  - †Dysdercus unicolor – type locality for species
- †Dyspetochrysa
  - †Dyspetochrysa vetuscula – type locality for species

== E ==
- †Earinus
  - †Earinus saxatilis – type locality for species
- †Ecclesimus
  - †Ecclesimus tenuiceps
- †Echinaphis – type locality for genus
  - †Echinaphis rohweri – type locality for species
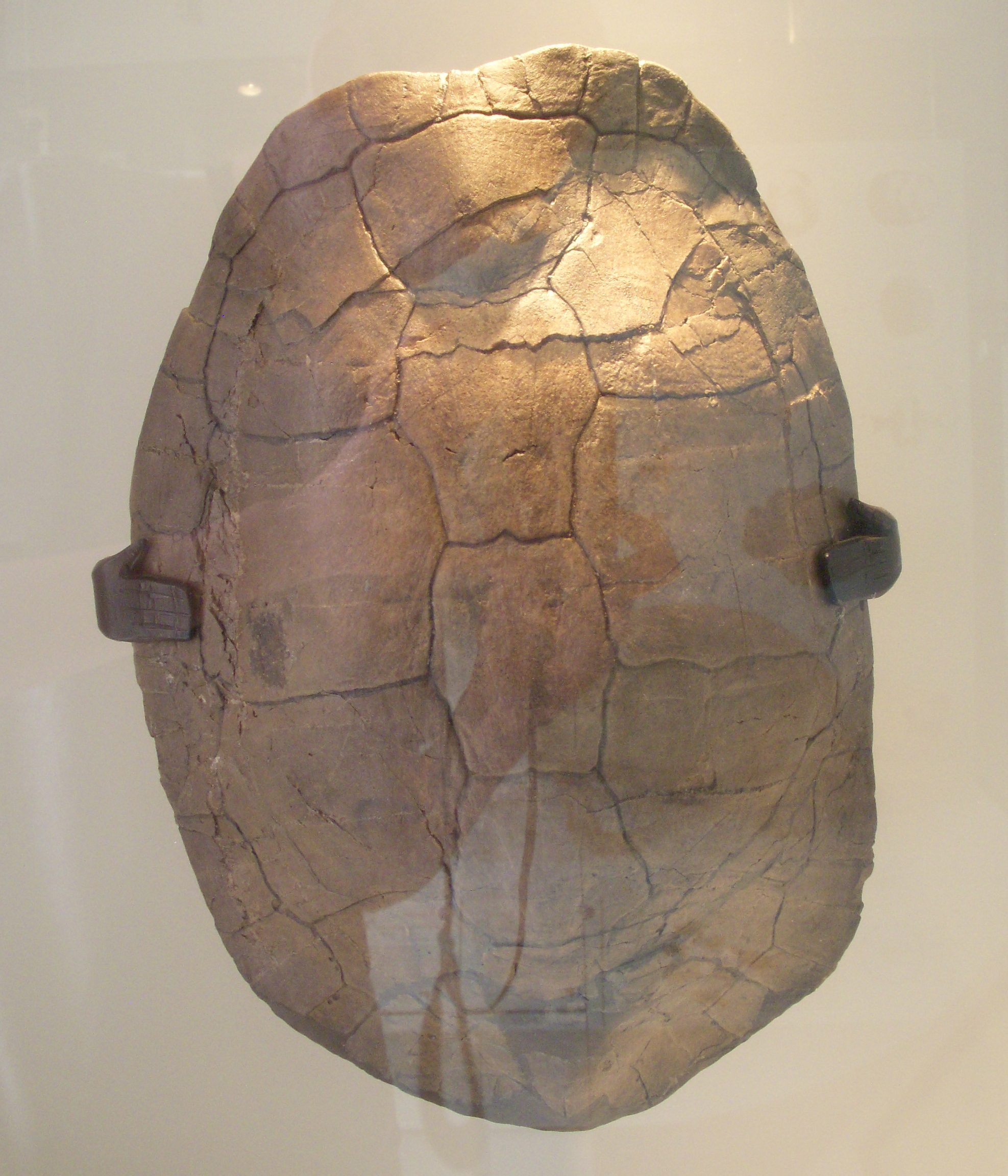
- Fossilized shell of the Eocene turtle Echmatemys
  †Echmatemys
  - †Echmatemys lativertebralis – or unidentified comparable form
  - †Echmatemys septaria
  - †Echmatemys stevensoniana – tentative report
- †Ectobius
  - †Ectobius kohlsi – type locality for species
- †Ectocion
  - †Ectocion major
  - †Ectocion medituber
  - †Ectocion osbornianus
  - †Ectocion parvus
- †Ectoconus
  - †Ectoconus ditrigonus
- †Ectoganus
  - †Ectoganus lobdelli
- †Ectopria
  - †Ectopria laticollis – type locality for species
- †Ectypodus
  - †Ectypodus childei – or unidentified comparable form
  - †Ectypodus musculus – type locality for species
  - †Ectypodus tardus
- †Elaeomyrmex – type locality for genus
  - †Elaeomyrmex coloradensis – type locality for species
  - †Elaeomyrmex gracilis – type locality for species
- †Elaphidion
  - †Elaphidion fracticorne – type locality for species
- Elaphropus
  - †Elaphropus incurvus
- †Elater
  - †Elater florissantensis – type locality for species
  - †Elater rohweri – type locality for species
  - †Elater scudderi – type locality for species
- Eleodes
  - †Eleodes granulatus – or unidentified comparable form
- †Elidiptera
  - †Elidiptera regularis – type locality for species
- †Emiliana – type locality for genus
  - †Emiliana alexandri – type locality for species
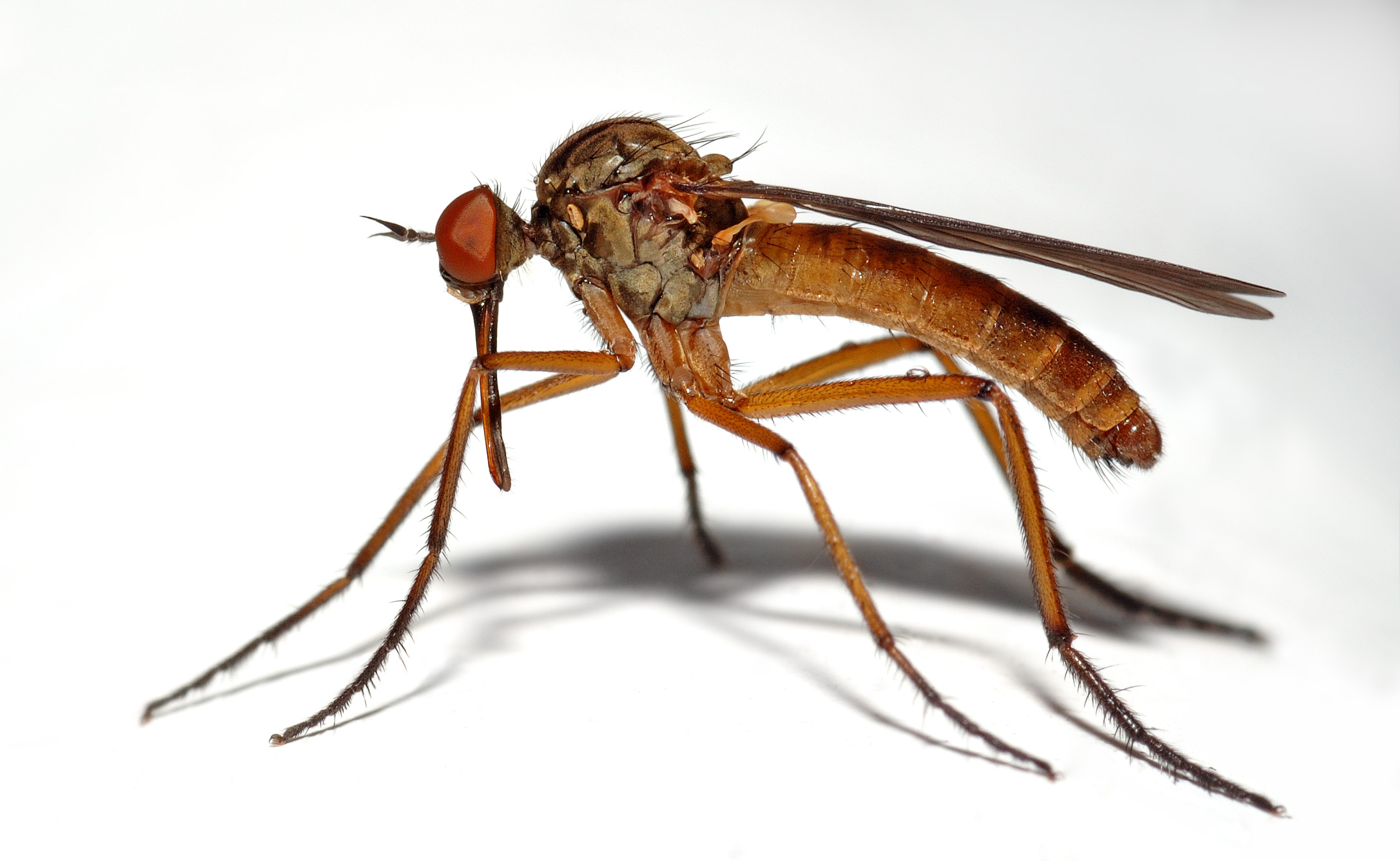
- A living Empis daggerfly
  †Empis
  - †Empis florissantana – type locality for species
  - †Empis infossa – type locality for species
  - †Empis miocenica – type locality for species
  - †Empis perdita – type locality for species
- †Enallagma
  - †Enallagma florissantella – type locality for species
  - †Enallagma mortuella – type locality for species
  - †Enallagma oblisum – type locality for species
- Engelhardia
  - †Engelhardia uintaensis – type locality for species
- Enochrus
  - †Enochrus hamiltoni
  - †Enochrus scudderi – type locality for species
- †Entimus
  - †Entimus primordialis – type locality for species
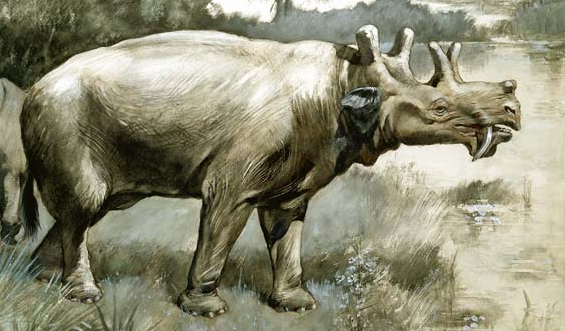
- Life restoration of a pair of the Eocene uintathere mammal Eobasileus. Charles R. Knight (1890s).
  †Eobasileus
  - †Eobasileus cornutus
- †Eobruneria – type locality for genus
  - †Eobruneria tessellata – type locality for species
- †Eobumbatrix
  - †Eobumbatrix latebrosa – type locality for species
- †Eocleonus – type locality for genus
  - †Eocleonus subjectus – type locality for species
- †Eocuculus – type locality for genus
  - †Eocuculus cherpinae – type locality for species
- †Eodiplurina – type locality for genus
  - †Eodiplurina cockerelli – type locality for species
- †Eoerianthus – type locality for genus
  - †Eoerianthus eocaenicus – type locality for species
  - †Eoerianthus multispinosa – type locality for species
- †Eoformica – type locality for genus
  - †Eoformica globularis – type locality for species
  - †Eoformica magna – type locality for species
  - †Eoformica pinguis – type locality for species
- †Eofulgorella – type locality for genus
  - †Eofulgorella bradburyi – type locality for species
- †Eoglyptosaurus
  - †Eoglyptosaurus donohoei
- †Eogryllus
  - †Eogryllus elongatus – type locality for species
  - †Eogryllus unicolor – type locality for species
- †Eohemichroa
  - †Eohemichroa eophila – type locality for species
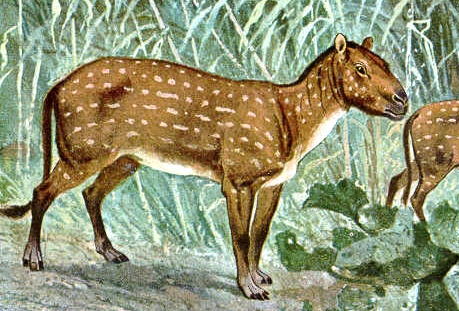
- Life restoration of the Eocene horse Eohippus. Heinrich Harder (1920).
  †Eohippus
  - †Eohippus angustidens
- †Eolestes – type locality for genus
  - †Eolestes syntheticus – type locality for species
- †Eoliarus – type locality for genus
  - †Eoliarus quadristictus – type locality for species
- †Eomerope – type locality for genus
  - †Eomerope tortriciformis – type locality for species
- †Eomogoplistes – type locality for genus
  - †Eomogoplistes longipennis – type locality for species
- †Eomyza – type locality for genus
  - †Eomyza holoptera – type locality for species
- †Eopachylosticta
  - †Eopachylosticta byrami – type locality for species
- †Eophlebomyia – type locality for genus
  - †Eophlebomyia claripennis – type locality for species
- †Eopimpla – type locality for genus
  - †Eopimpla grandis – type locality for species
- †Eosacantha – type locality for genus
  - †Eosacantha delocranioides – type locality for species
- †Eostentatrix
  - †Eostentatrix cockerelli – type locality for species
  - †Eostentatrix ostentata – type locality for species
- †Eotetrix – type locality for genus
  - †Eotetrix unicornis – type locality for species
- †Eothes – type locality for genus
  - †Eothes elegans – type locality for species
- †Eotingis – type locality for genus
  - †Eotingis antennata – type locality for species
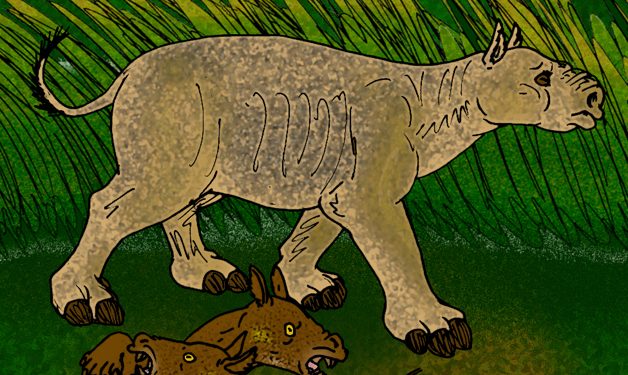
- Life restoration of the Eocene brontothere mammal Eotitanops
  †Eotitanops
  - †Eotitanops borealis
- †Eotrella – type locality for genus
  - †Eotrella mira – type locality for species
- †Eotylopus
- †Eozacla
  - †Eozacla arachnomorpha – type locality for species
  - †Eozacla problematica – type locality for species
- †Epallagites – type locality for genus
  - †Epallagites avus – type locality for species
- †Epanuraea – type locality for genus
  - †Epanuraea ingenita – type locality for species
- †Ephalus
  - †Ephalus adumbratus – type locality for species
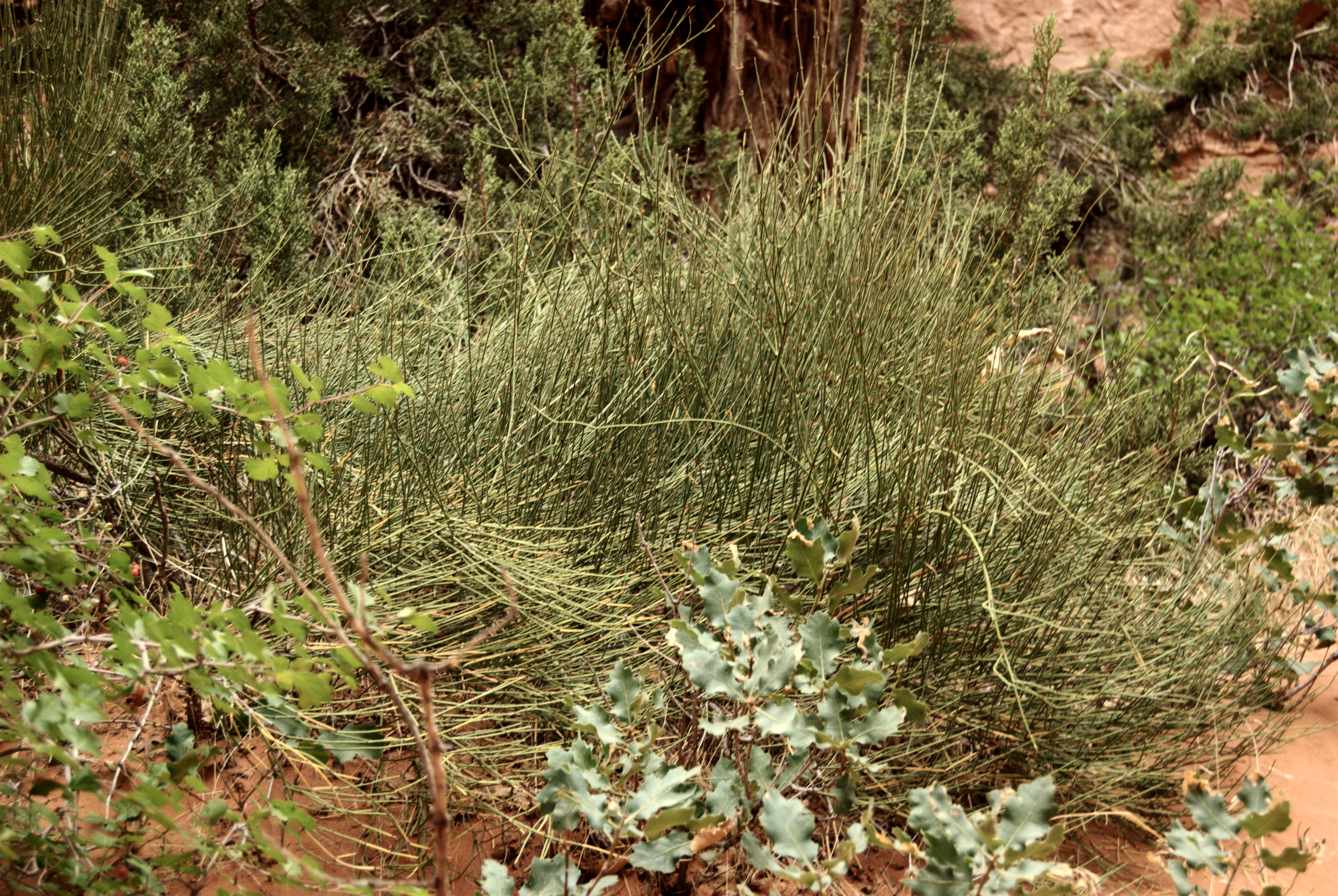
- Living member of the shrub genus Ephedra, which includes the joint-pines and Mormon tea
  Ephedra
  - †Ephedra miocenica
- †Ephemera
  - †Ephemera exsucca – type locality for species
  - †Ephemera howarthi – type locality for species
  - †Ephemera immobilis – type locality for species
  - †Ephemera interempta – type locality for species
  - †Ephemera macilenta – type locality for species
  - †Ephemera pumicosa – type locality for species
  - †Ephemera tabifica – type locality for species
- †Epicaerus
  - †Epicaerus effossus
  - †Epicaerus eradicatus
  - †Epicaerus evigoratus
  - †Epicaerus exanimis
  - †Epicaerus excissus – type locality for species
  - †Epicaerus saxatilis
  - †Epicaerus subterraneus
  - †Epicaerus terrosus
- Epicauta
  - †Epicauta subneglecta – type locality for species
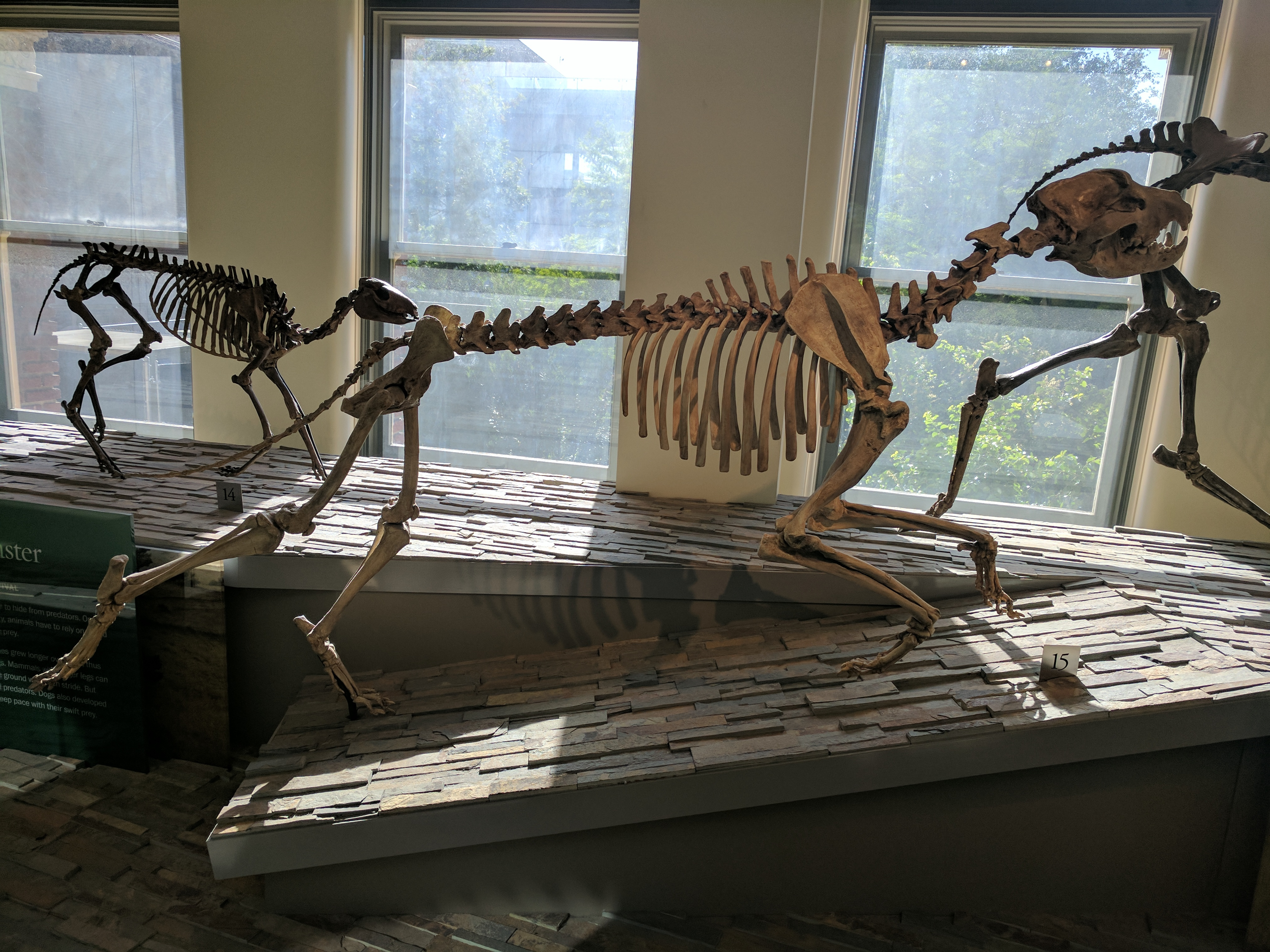
- Mounted fossilized skeleton of the Miocene bone-crushing dog Epicyon
  †Epicyon
  - †Epicyon haydeni
- †Epihippus
  - †Epihippus gracilis
- †Epiphloeus
  - †Epiphloeus pristinus – type locality for species
- Epuraea
  - †Epuraea planulata
- †Epyris
  - †Epyris deletus – type locality for species
- †Equisetum
  - †Equisetum florissantense
  - †Equisetum winchesteri
- Equus
  - †Equus conversidens
  - †Equus francisci
  - †Equus scotti – or unidentified comparable form
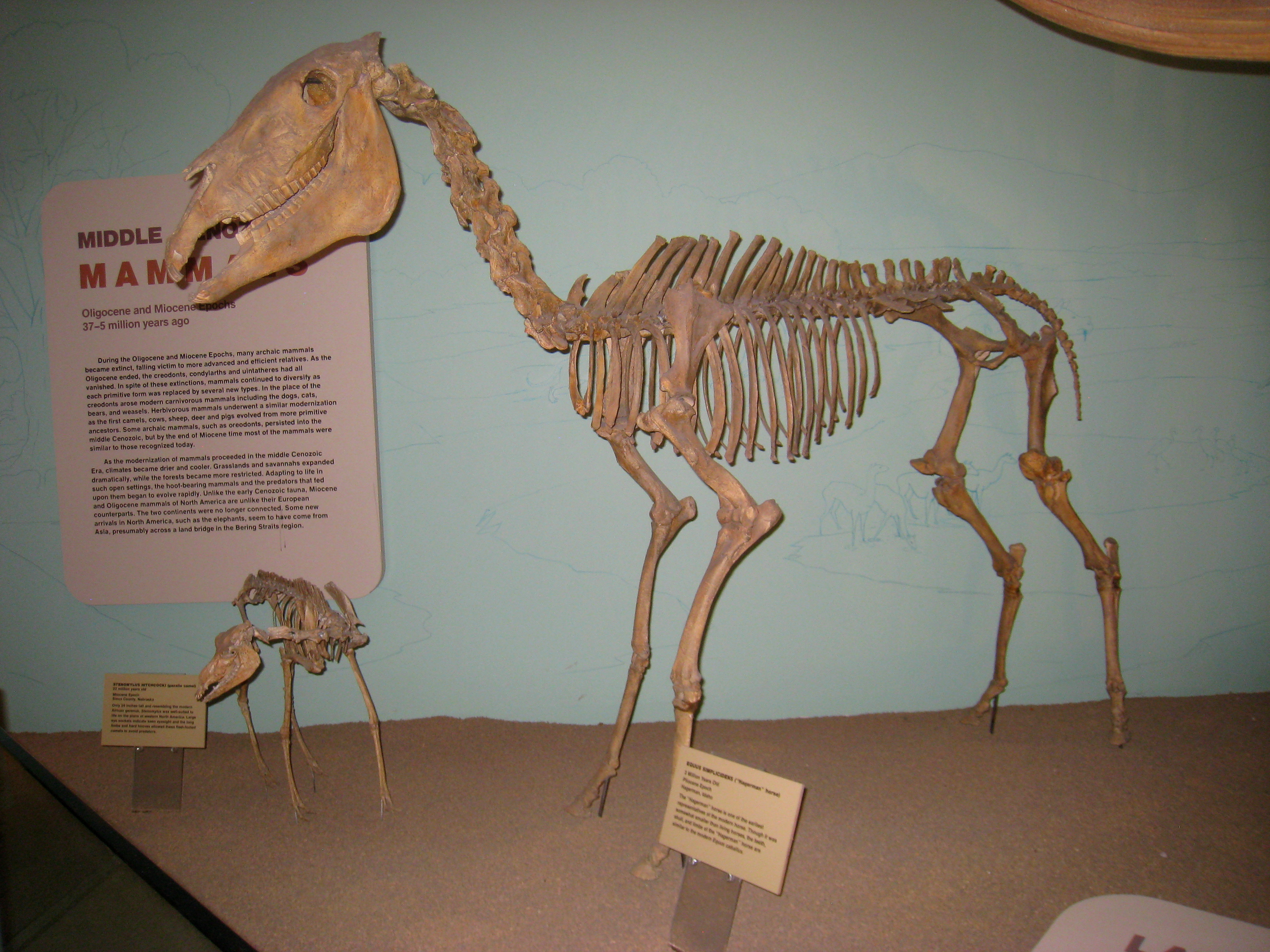
  - Fossilized skeleton of the Pliocene-Pleistocene horse Equus simplicidens, also known as the Hagerman horse or American zebra
    †Equus simplicidens
- Eremophila
  - †Eremophila alpestris
- Erethizon
- Eriocampa
  - †Eriocampa bruesi – type locality for species
  - †Eriocampa celata – type locality for species
  - †Eriocampa disjecta – type locality for species
  - †Eriocampa pristina – type locality for species
  - †Eriocampa scudderi – type locality for species
  - †Eriocampa synthetica – type locality for species
- †Eriophyes – tentative report
  - †Eriophyes beutenmulleri
- †Eristalis
  - †Eristalis lapideus – type locality for species
- †Ernobius
  - †Ernobius effetus – type locality for species
- †Erycus
  - †Erycus brevicollis – type locality for species
- †Esthonyx
  - †Esthonyx acutidens
  - †Esthonyx bisulcatus
  - †Esthonyx spatularius
- †Eterochalcis
  - †Eterochalcis scudderi – type locality for species
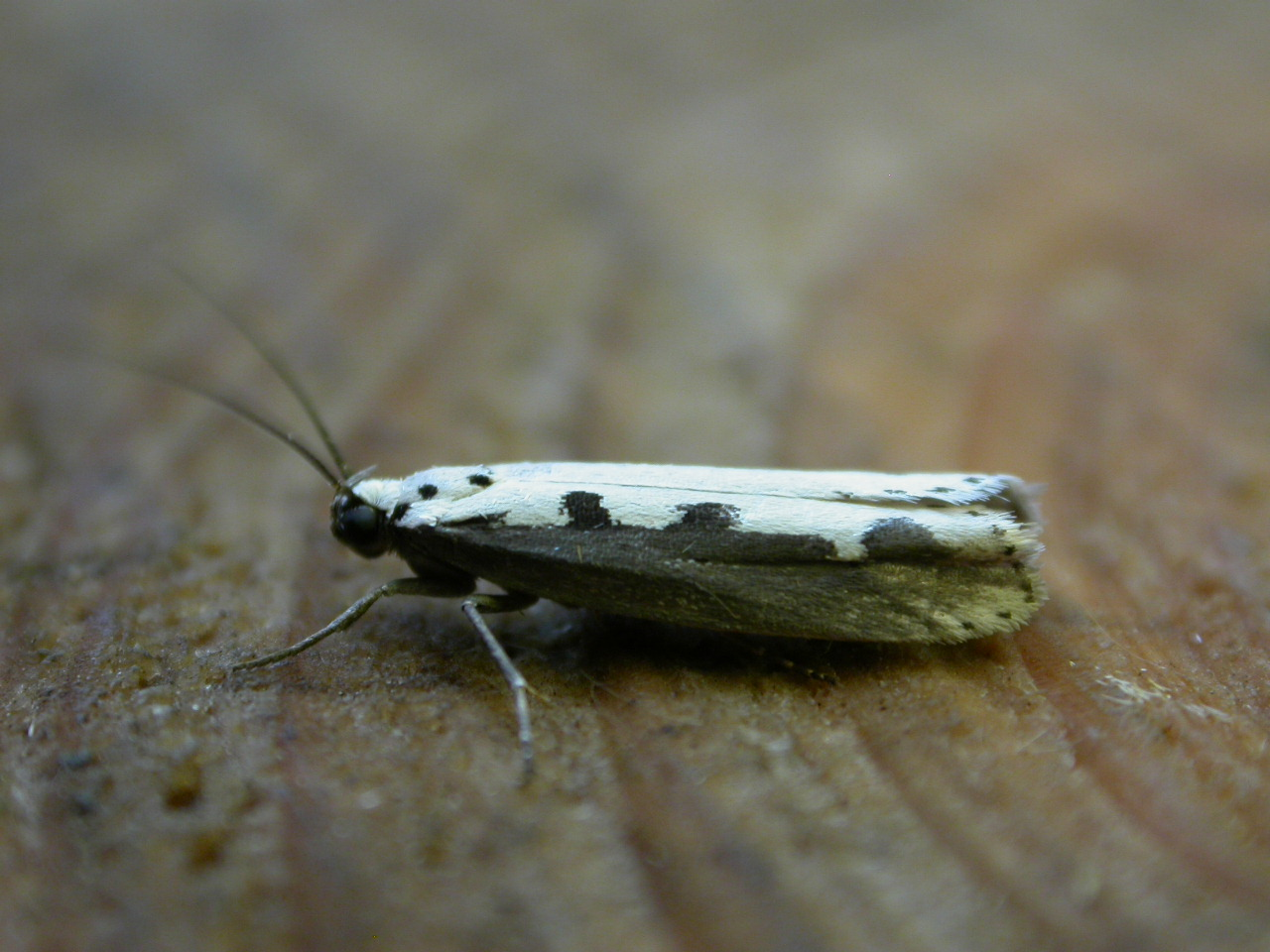
- A living Ethmia moth
  †Ethmia
  - †Ethmia mortuella – type locality for species
- †Etirocoris – type locality for genus
  - †Etirocoris infernalis – type locality for species
- †Eubazus
  - †Eubazus wilmattae – type locality for species
- †Eucallimyia
  - †Eucallimyia fortis – type locality for species
- †Eucicones
  - †Eucicones oblongopunctata – type locality for species
- Eucnecosum
  - †Eucnecosum brachypterum
  - †Eucnecosum brunnescens
  - †Eucnecosum tenue
- †Eucnemis
  - †Eucnemis antiquatus – type locality for species
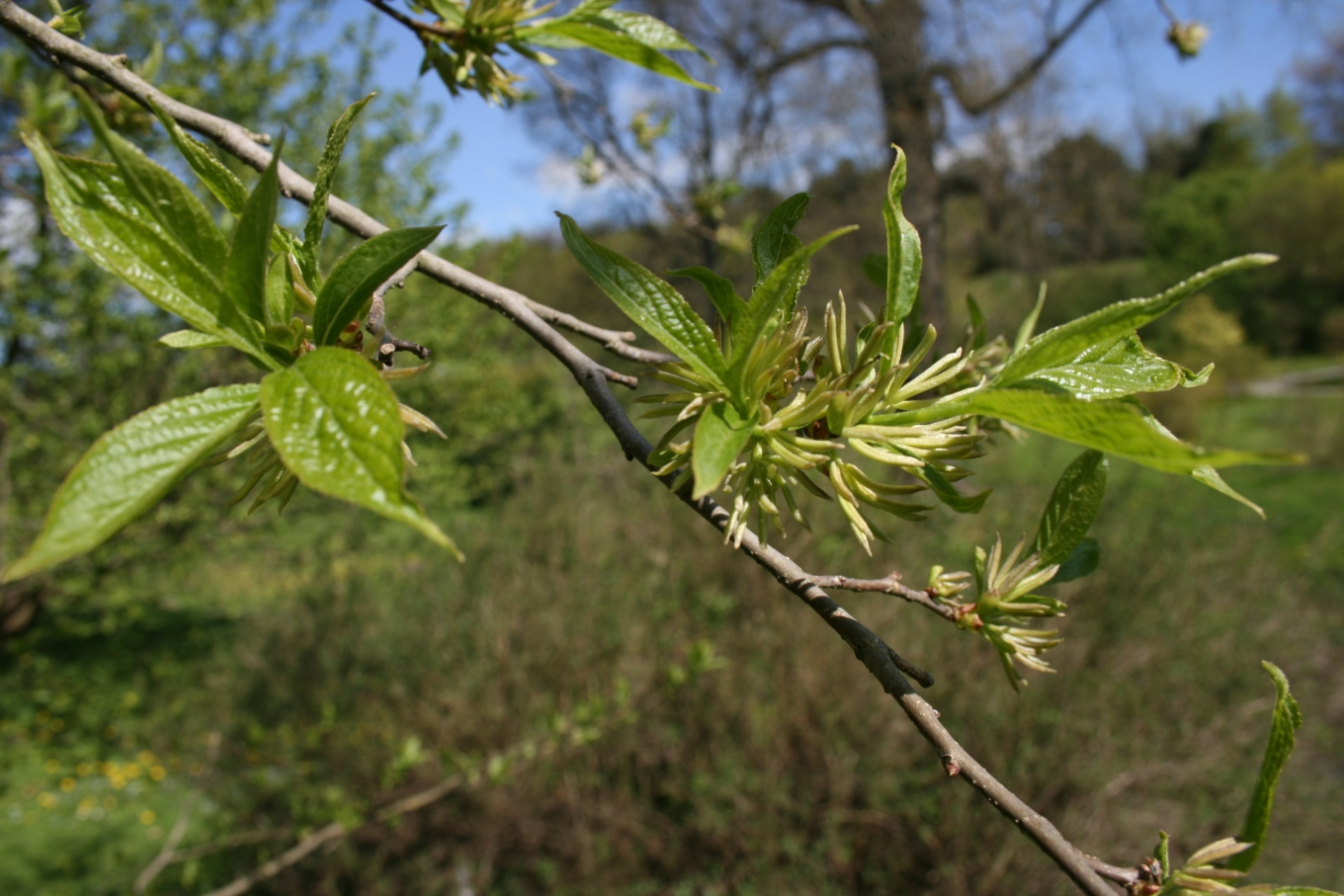
- Foliage and flowers of a living Eucommia tree
  †Eucommia
  - †Eucommia serrata
- †Eucorites – type locality for genus
  - †Eucorites serescens – type locality for species
- †Eudasytites – type locality for genus
  - †Eudasytites listriformis – type locality for species
- †Eudomus
  - †Eudomus pinguis
  - †Eudomus robustus
- Eugenia
  - †Eugenia americana
  - †Eugenia arenaceaeformis
- †Eugnamptidea – type locality for genus
  - †Eugnamptidea florissantensis – type locality for species
  - †Eugnamptidea robusta – type locality for species
  - †Eugnamptidea tertiaria – type locality for species
- †Eulithomyrmex – type locality for genus
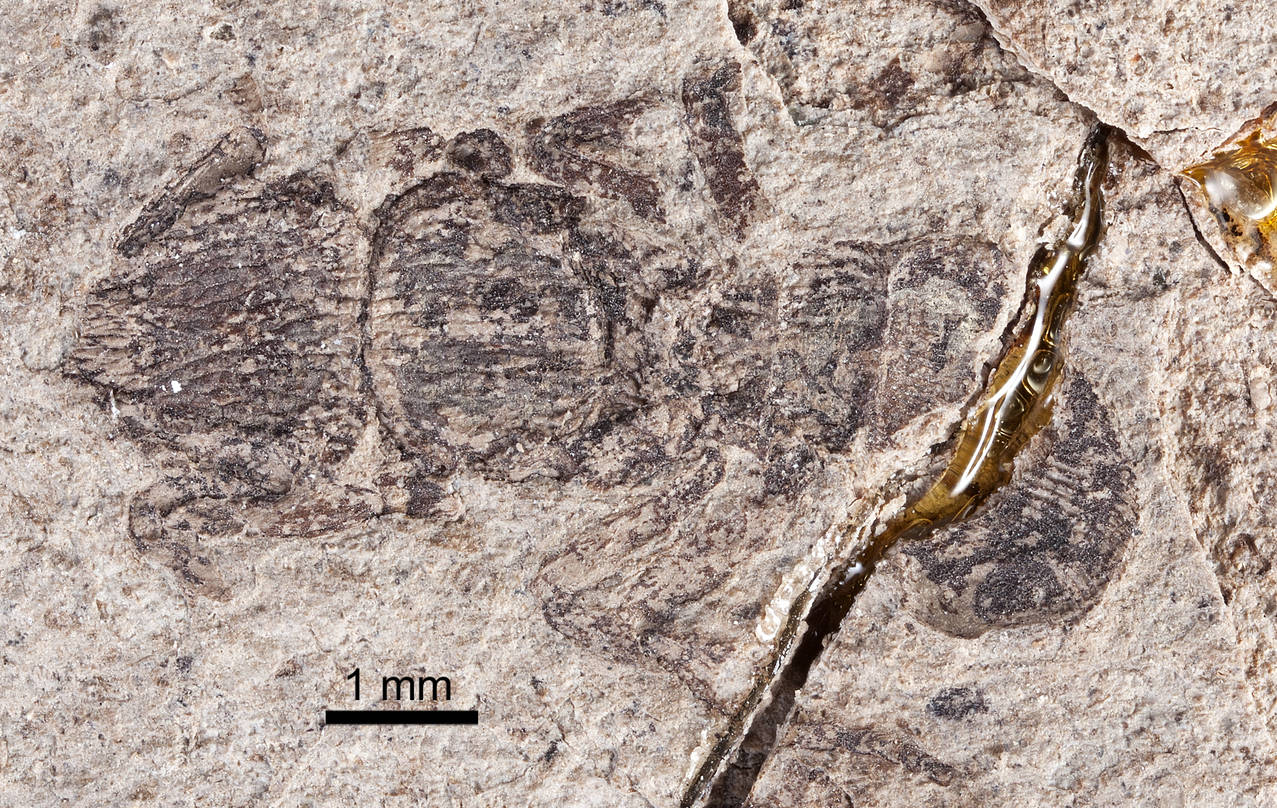
  - Fossil found in Colorado; the holotype specimen of the Eocene ant Eulithomyrmex
    †Eulithomyrmex rugosus – type locality for species
  - †Eulithomyrmex striatus – type locality for species
- †Eumys
  - †Eumys brachyodus
  - †Eumys elegans
- †Euparius
  - †Euparius adumbratus – type locality for species
  - †Euparius arcessitus – type locality for species
- Euphorbia
  - †Euphorbia minuta
- †Euphorus
  - †Euphorus indurescens – type locality for species
- †Eurhinus
  - †Eurhinus occultus – type locality for species
- †Euroxenomys
- †Eurytoma
  - †Eurytoma sepulta – type locality for species
  - †Eurytoma sequax – type locality for species
- Eutamias
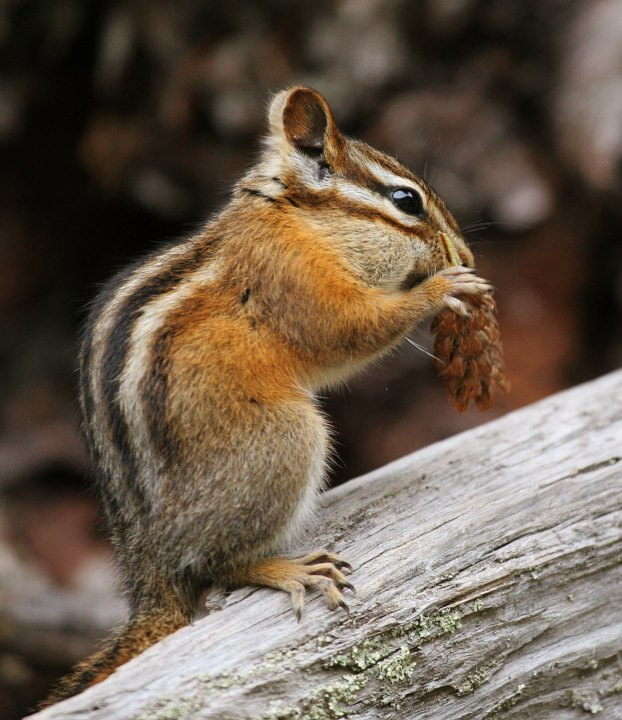
  - A living Tamias minimus (formerly Eutamias minimus), or least chipmunk
    †Eutamias minimus – or unidentified comparable form
- †Eutrichopleurus
  - †Eutrichopleurus miocenus – type locality for species
- †Eutypomys
  - †Eutypomys parvus
- †Evopes
  - †Evopes occubatus – type locality for species
  - †Evopes veneratus – type locality for species
- Exechia
  - †Exechia priscula – type locality for species
- †Exenterus
  - †Exenterus dormitans – type locality for species
- †Exetastes
  - †Exetastes inveteratus – type locality for species
- †Exitelus – type locality for genus
  - †Exitelus exsanguis – type locality for species
- †Exochilum
  - †Exochilum inusitatum – type locality for species
- †Exochus
  - †Exochus captus – type locality for species
- †Exostinus – type locality for genus
  - †Exostinus serratus – type locality for species

== F ==
- †Fagopsis
  - †Fagopsis longifolia
- Falcipennis
  - †Falcipennis canadenis
- Falco
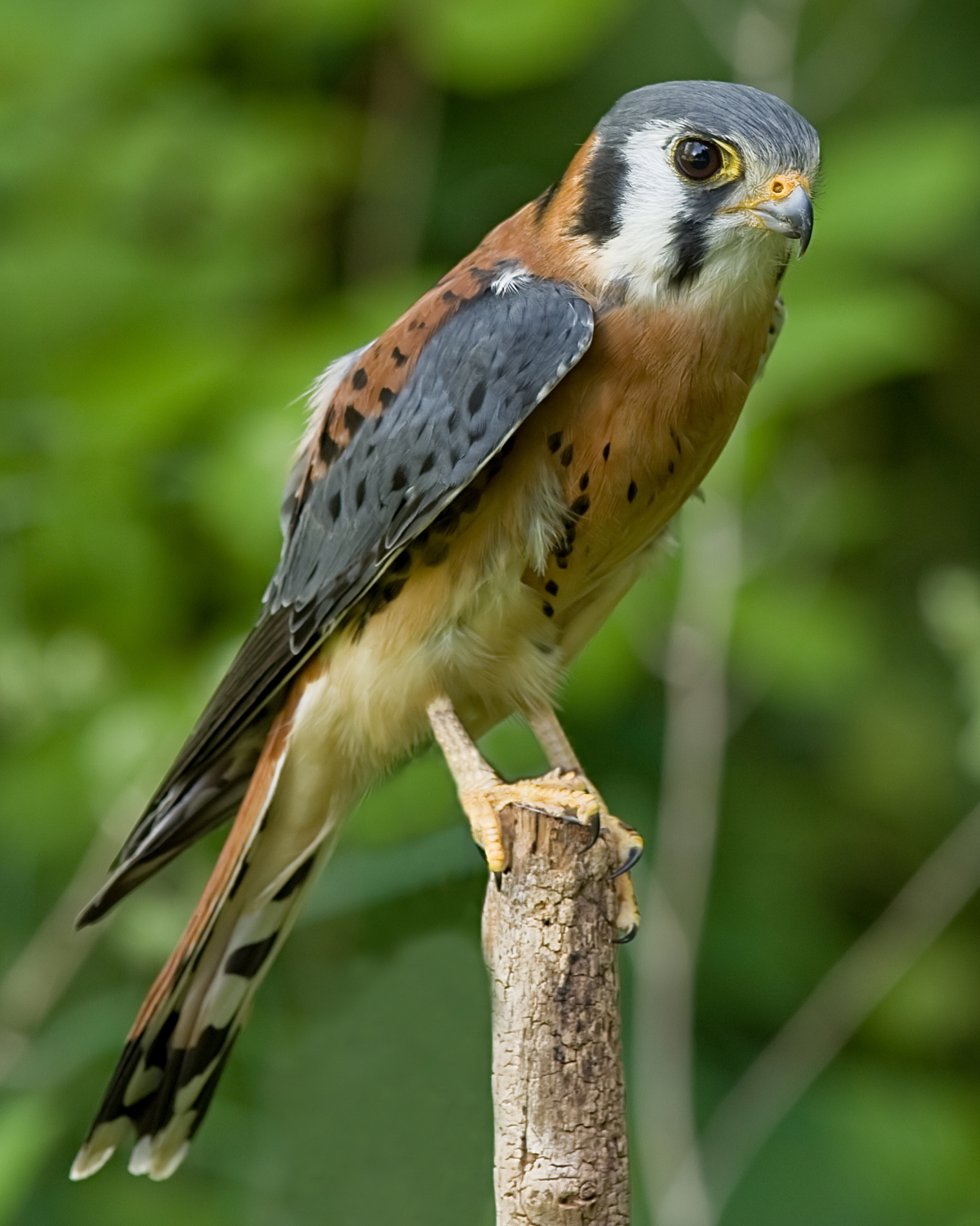
  - A living Falco sparverius, or American kestrel
    †Falco sparverius
- †Fenusa – type locality for genus
  - †Fenusa parvus – type locality for species
  - †Fenusa primula – type locality for species
- †Fibla
  - †Fibla exusta – type locality for species
- Ficus
  - †Ficus affinis
  - †Ficus artocarpoides
  - †Ficus bruesi
  - †Ficus florissantella
  - †Ficus florissantia
  - †Ficus minutidens
  - †Ficus planicostata
  - †Ficus subtruncata
  - †Ficus uncata
- †Figites
  - †Figites solus – type locality for species
- †Florimena – type locality for genus
  - †Florimena impressa – type locality for species
- †Floriscolia – type locality for genus
  - †Floriscolia relicta – type locality for species
- †Florissantia (planthopper) – type locality for genus
  - †Florissantia elegans – type locality for species
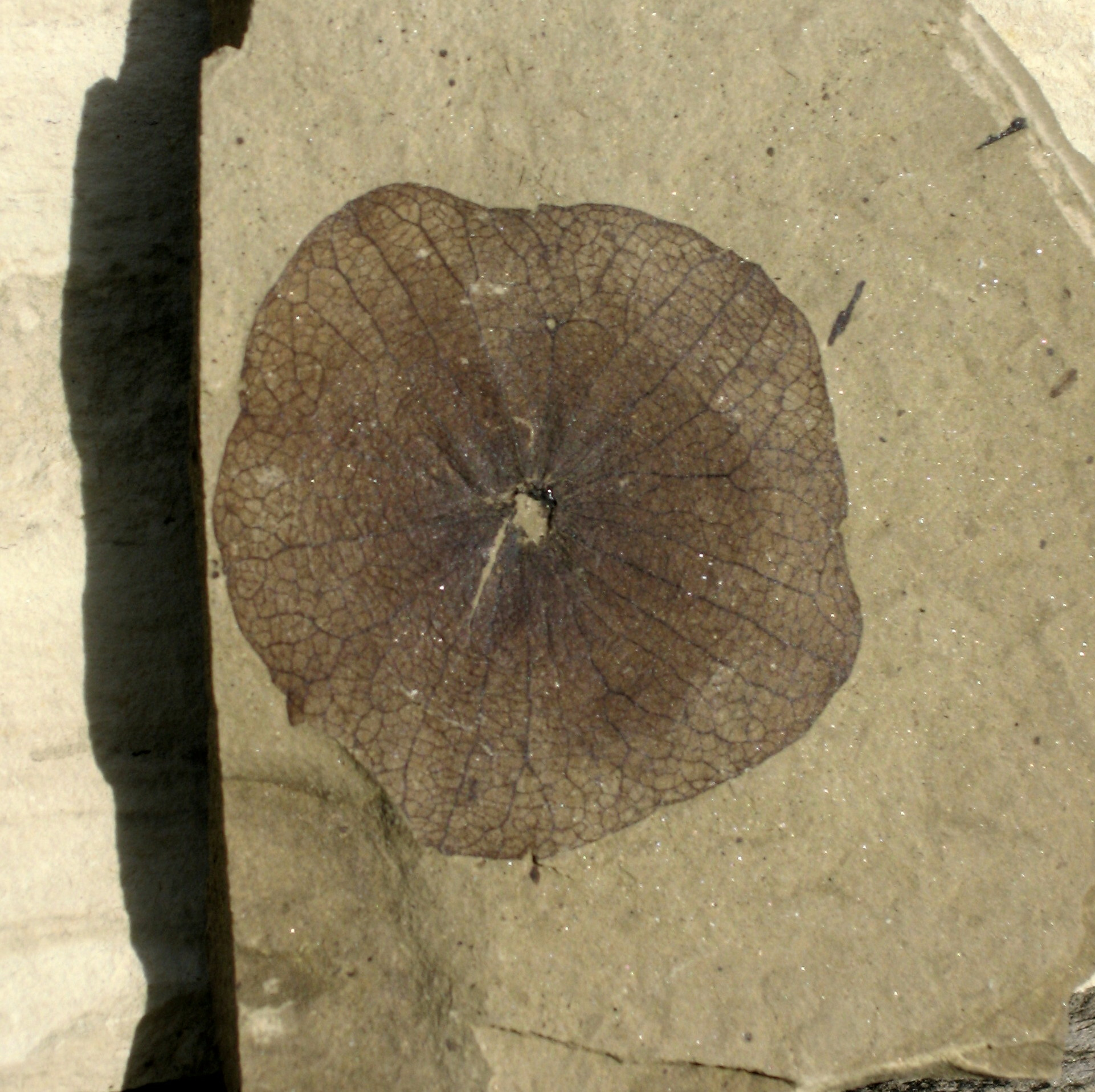
- Florissantia sp. fossil flower
  †Florissantia (plant) – type locality for genus
  - †Florissantia speirii
- †Florissantinus – type locality for genus
  - †Florissantinus angulatus – type locality for species
- †Florissantoraphidia
  - †Florissantoraphidia funerata – type locality for species
  - †Florissantoraphidia mortua – type locality for species
- > Formica
  - †Formica cockerelli – type locality for species
  - †Formica grandis – type locality for species
  - †Formica neorufibarbis
  - †Formica robusta – type locality for species
- †Fornax
  - †Fornax relictus – type locality for species
- †Frangulops – type locality for genus
  - †Frangulops pseudostenophylla – type locality for species. Formerly known as Ilex pseudostenophylla.
- †Franimys – tentative report
- †Fraxinus
  - †Fraxinus eocenica
- Fulgora
  - †Fulgora obticescens – type locality for species
- Fulica
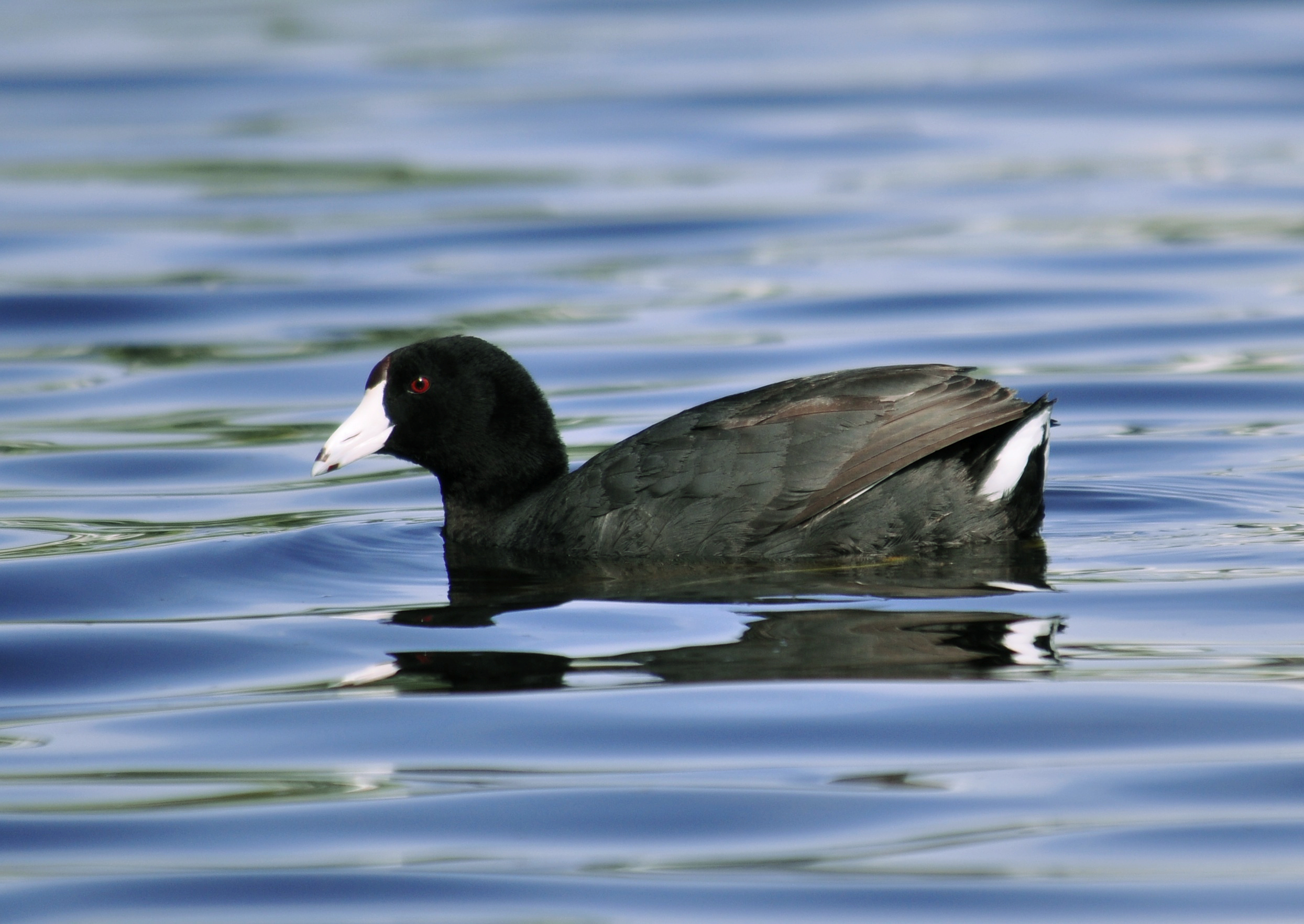
  - A living Fulica americana, or American coot
    Fulica americana
- †Fuscus – tentative report
  - †Fuscus faecatus – type locality for species

== G ==
- †Galesimorpha
  - †Galesimorpha wheeleri – type locality for species
- †Gastrallanobium – type locality for genus
  - †Gastrallanobium subconfusum – type locality for species
- †Gaurotes
  - †Gaurotes striatopunctatus – type locality for species
- †Gelastops
  - †Gelastops parcus
- †Geocoris
  - †Geocoris infernorum – type locality for species
- Geodromicus
  - †Geodromicus abditus – type locality for species
- Geomys
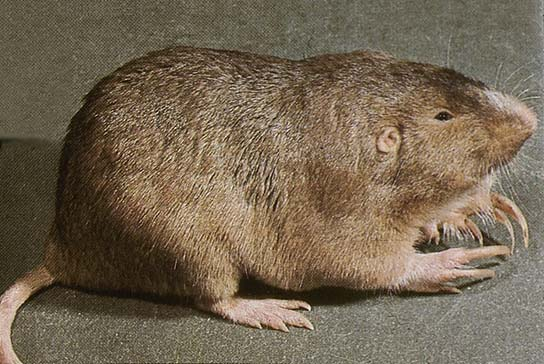
  - A living Geomys bursarius, or Plains pocket gopher
    †Geomys bursarius
- †Geotiphia – type locality for genus
  - †Geotiphia foxiana – type locality for species
  - †Geotiphia halictina – type locality for species
  - †Geotiphia pachysoma – type locality for species
  - †Geotiphia sternbergi – type locality for species
- †Geralophus
  - †Geralophus antiquarius
  - †Geralophus discessus – type locality for species
  - †Geralophus fossicius
  - †Geralophus lassatus
  - †Geralophus occultus
  - †Geralophus pumiceus – type locality for species
  - †Geralophus repositus
  - †Geralophus retritus – type locality for species
  - †Geralophus saxuosus – type locality for species
  - †Geralophus scudderi – type locality for species
- †Geranchon – type locality for genus
  - †Geranchon davisii – type locality for species
- †Geron – tentative report
  - †Geron platysoma – type locality for species
- †Geroncolabis
  - †Geroncolabis commixta – type locality for species
  - †Geroncolabis tertiaria – type locality for species
- Gerris
  - †Gerris protobates – type locality for species
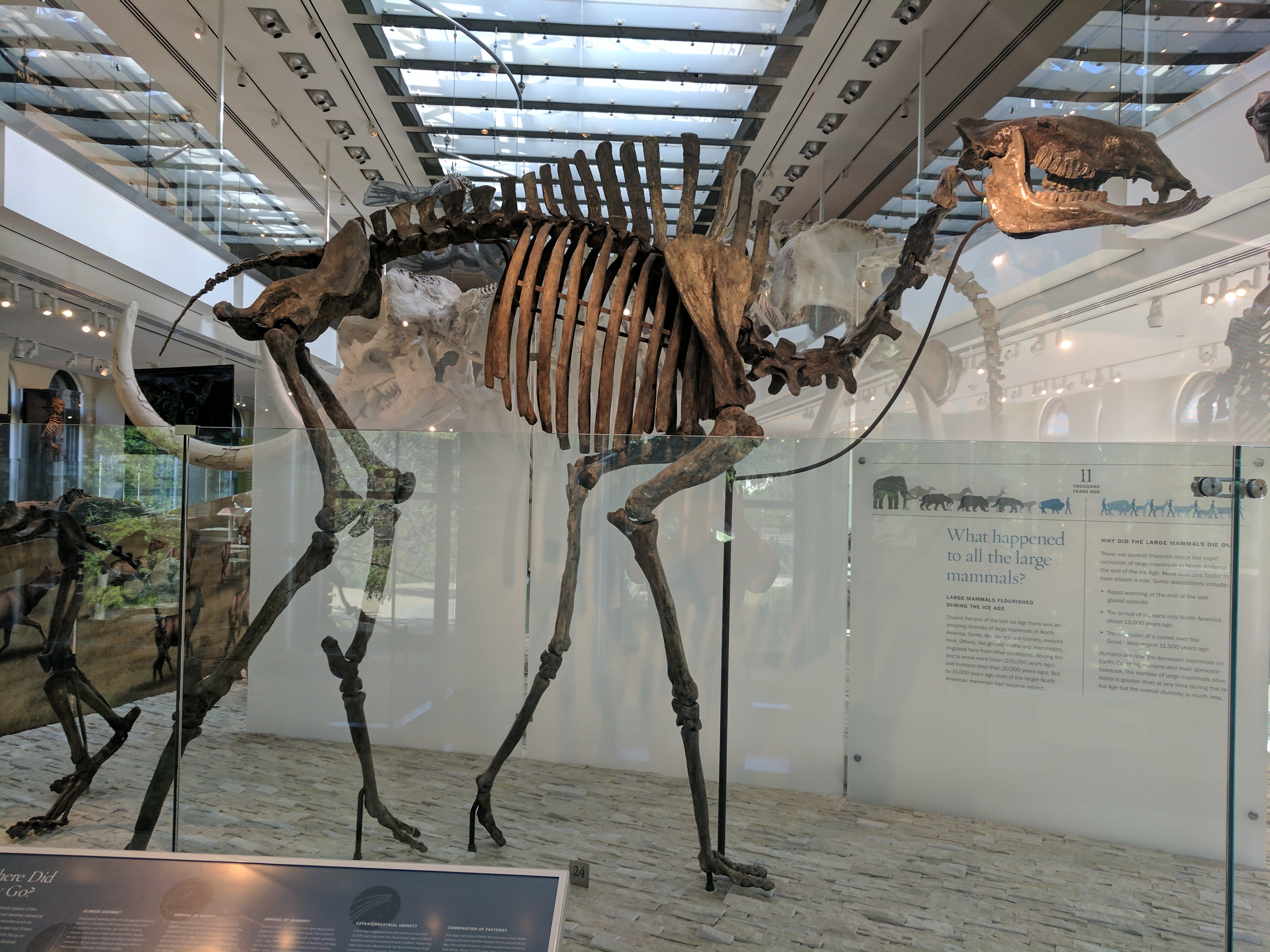
- Mounted fossilized skeleton of the Miocene-Pleistocene camel Titanotylopus
  †Gigantocamelus
- †Glossina – type locality for genus
  - †Glossina oligocenus – type locality for species
  - †Glossina osborni – type locality for species
- †Glypta
  - †Glypta aurora – type locality for species
- †Glyptosaurus
  - †Glyptosaurus sylvestris
- †Glyptostrobu
  - †Glyptostrobu nordenskioldi
- Glyptostrobus
  - †Glyptostrobus nordenskioldi
- †Gnathium
  - †Gnathium aetatis – type locality for species
- Gnophomyia
  - †Gnophomyia seiverti – type locality for species
- †Gomphocerus
  - †Gomphocerus abstrusus – type locality for species
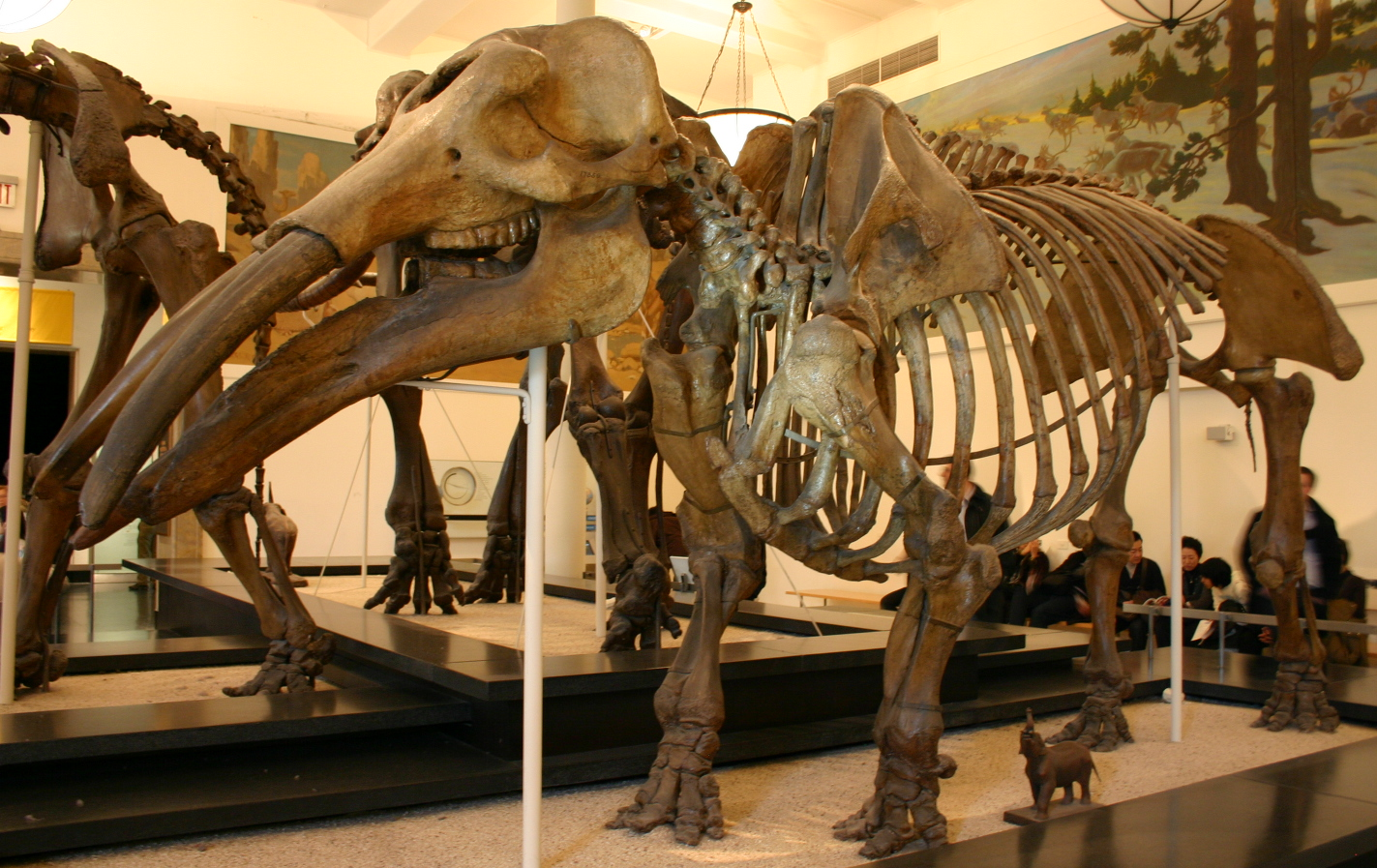
- Mounted fossilized skeleton of the Miocene-Pleistocene elephant relative Gomphotherium
  †Gomphotherium
  - †Gomphotherium obscurum
- †Gonodera
  - †Gonodera antiqua – type locality for species
  - †Gonodera vulcanica – type locality for species
- †Gorytes
  - †Gorytes archoryctes – type locality for species
- †Grammoptera
  - †Grammoptera nanella – type locality for species
- †Gregorymys
  - †Gregorymys larsoni
- †Gryllacris
  - †Gryllacris cineris – type locality for species
  - †Gryllacris mutilata – type locality for species
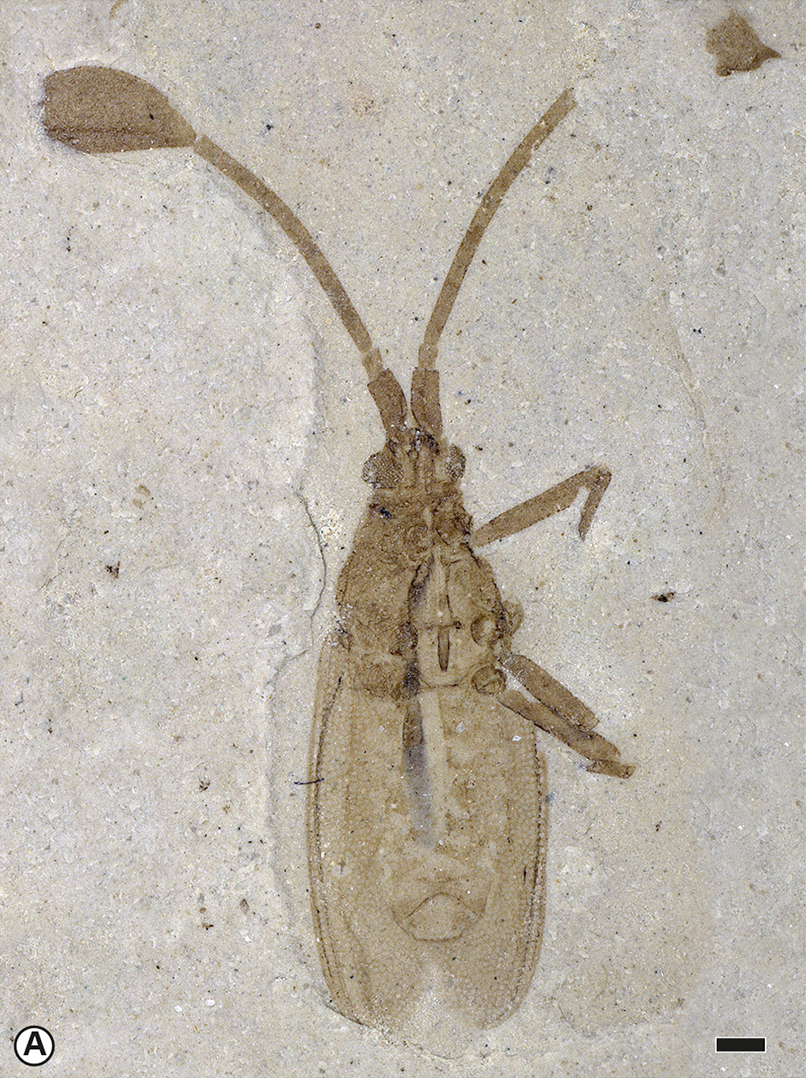
- Fossil found in Garfield County; the holotype specimen of the Eocene lace bug Gyaclavator
  †Gyaclavator – type locality for genus
  - †Gyaclavator kohlsi – type locality for species
- †Gymnetron
  - †Gymnetron antecurrens – type locality for species
- †Gymnopternus
  - †Gymnopternus lacustris – type locality for species
- †Gymnorhinus
  - †Gymnorhinus cyanocephatus
- †Gypona
  - †Gypona cinercia – type locality for species
- †Gyrophaena
  - †Gyrophaena saxicola – type locality for species

== H ==
- †Hadrianus
  - †Hadrianus corsoni
- †Hadronema
  - †Hadronema cinerescens – type locality for species
- Halesia
  - †Halesia reticulata
- †Hammapteryx
  - †Hammapteryx ceryniiformis – type locality for species
  - †Hammapteryx lepidoides – type locality for species
  - †Hammapteryx tripunctata – type locality for species
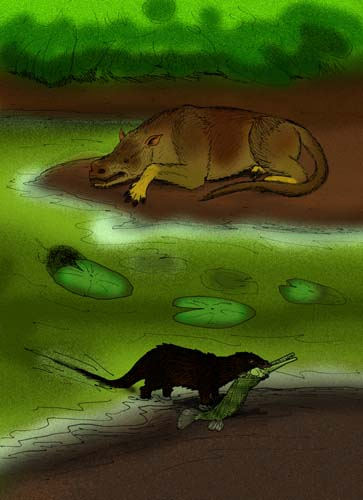
- Restoration of the Paleocene-Eocene mesonychian mammal Hapalodectes (below)
  †Hapalodectes
  - †Hapalodectes leptognathus – or unidentified comparable form
- †Haplaletes
  - †Haplaletes pelicatus
- †Haploconus
  - †Haploconus entoconus – or unidentified comparable form
- †Haplolambda
  - †Haplolambda quinni
- †Haplomylus
  - †Haplomylus simpsoni
  - †Haplomylus speirianus
- Harpalus
  - †Harpalus maceratus – type locality for species
  - †Harpalus nuperus – type locality for species
  - †Harpalus redivivus – type locality for species
  - †Harpalus ulomaeformis – type locality for species
  - †Harpalus veterum – type locality for species
  - †Harpalus whitfieldii
- †Harrymys
- †Heeria – type locality for genus
  - †Heeria foeda – type locality for species
  - †Heeria gulosa – type locality for species
  - †Heeria lapidosa – type locality for species
- †Helaletes
  - †Helaletes nanus – or unidentified comparable form
- †Helichus
  - †Helichus eruptus – type locality for species
  - †Helichus tenuior – type locality for species
- †Heliscomys
  - †Heliscomys vetus
- †Hellwigia
  - †Hellwigia obsoleta – type locality for species
- Helophorus
  - †Helophorus auricollis
  - †Helophorus eclectus
- †Hemiacodon
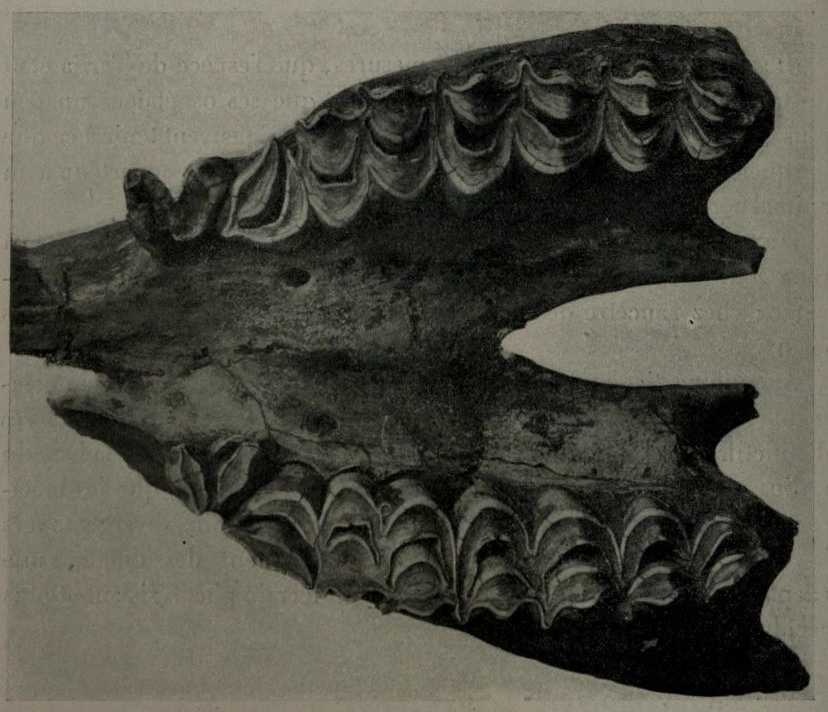
- Fossilized lower jaw of the Miocene-Pleistocene llama relative Hemiauchenia
  †Hemiauchenia
  - †Hemiauchenia macrocephala
- †Hemiteles
  - †Hemiteles lapidescens – type locality for species
  - †Hemiteles obtectus – type locality for species
  - †Hemiteles priscus – type locality for species
  - †Hemiteles veternus – type locality for species
- †Heptacodon
- †Heptodon
  - †Heptodon calciculus
  - †Heptodon posticus
- †Heriades
  - †Heriades bowditchi – type locality for species
  - †Heriades halictinus – type locality for species
  - †Heriades laminarum – type locality for species
  - †Heriades mersatus – type locality for species
  - †Heriades mildredae – type locality for species
  - †Heriades priscus – type locality for species
  - †Heriades saxosus – type locality for species
- †Herpetotherium
  - †Herpetotherium fugax
  - †Herpetotherium innominatum
  - †Herpetotherium knighti
- Hersiliola
- †Hesperagrion
  - †Hesperagrion praevolans – type locality for species
- †Hesperhys
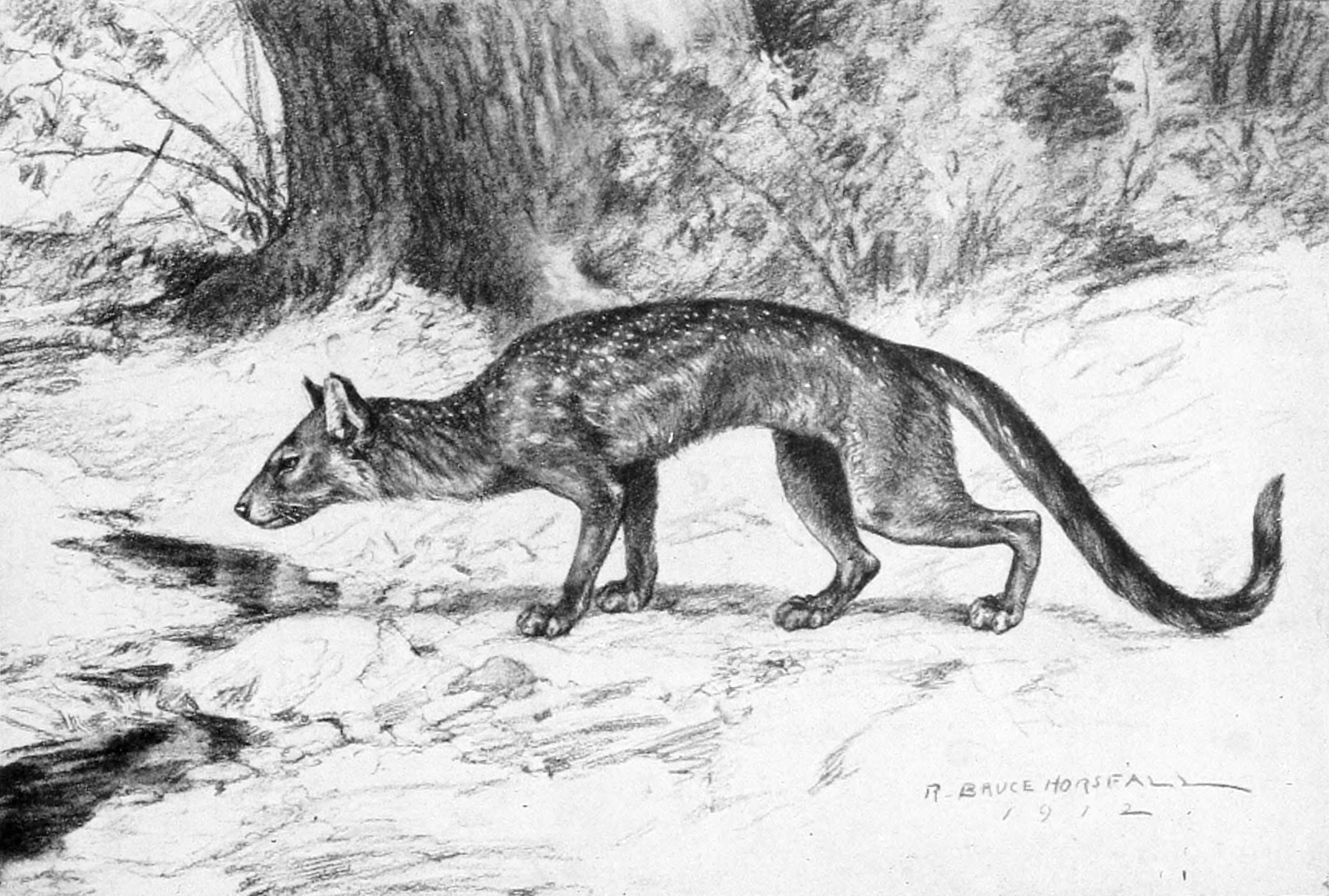
- Life restoration of the Eocene-Oligocene dog Hesperocyon. Robert Bruce Horsfall (1913).
  †Hesperocyon
  - †Hesperocyon coloradensis
  - †Hesperocyon gregarius
- †Hesperolagomys
- Heterodon
  - †Heterodon nasicus
- †Heteromyza
  - †Heteromyza detecta – type locality for species
  - †Heteromyza miocenica – type locality for species
- †Heterothops
  - †Heterothops conticens – type locality for species
- †Hexacodus
  - †Hexacodus pelodes
- †Hexerites – type locality for genus
  - †Hexerites primalis – type locality for species
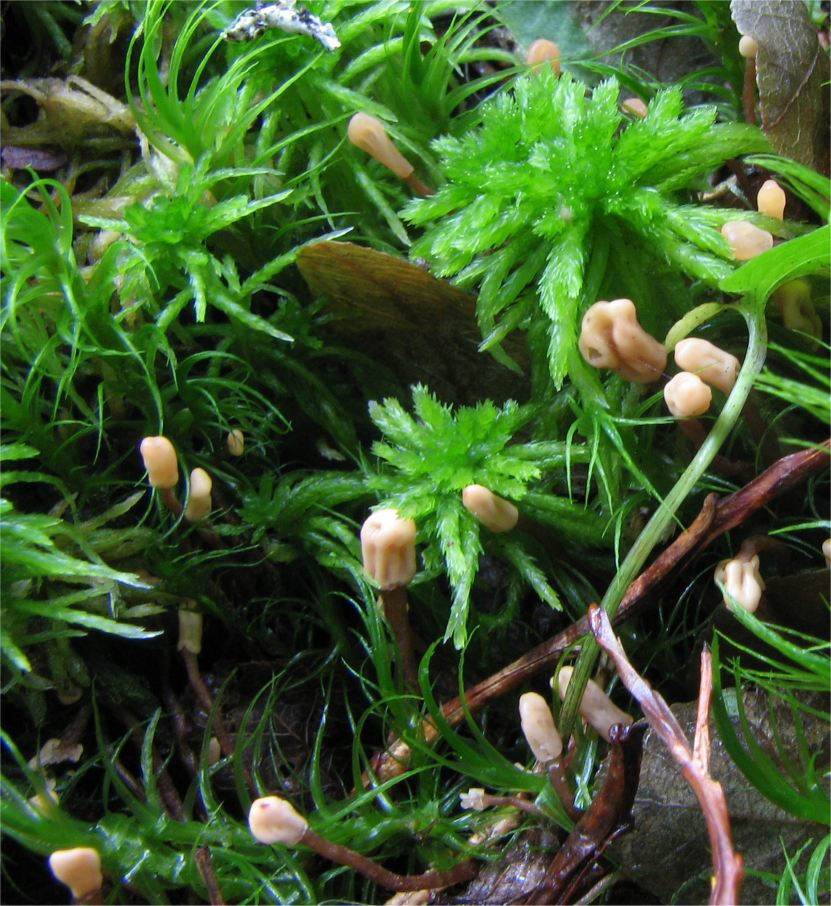
- Heyderia fungus growing among moss
  †Heyderia
  - †Heyderia coloradensis – type locality for species
- †Hiatensor
  - †Hiatensor semirutus – type locality for species
- †Hipporhinops – type locality for genus
  - †Hipporhinops sternbergi – type locality for species
- †Hirmoneura – type locality for genus
  - †Hirmoneura willistoni – type locality for species
- Holbrookia
  - †Holbrookia maculata
- †Holcorpa – type locality for genus
  - †Holcorpa maculosa – type locality for species
- †Homoeogamia
  - †Homoeogamia ventriosa – type locality for species
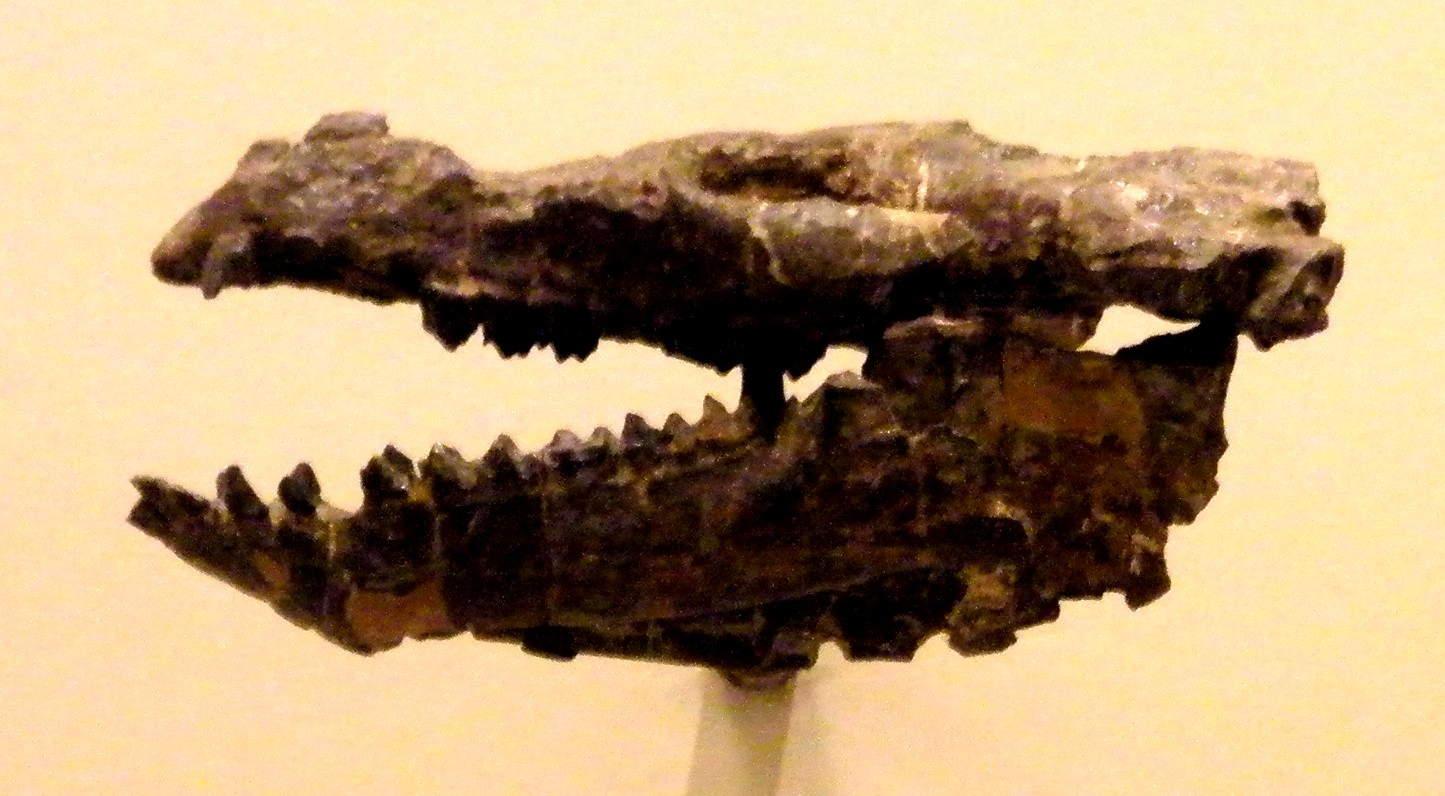
- Fossilized skull of the Eocene tapir-like mammal Homogalax
  †Homogalax
  - †Homogalax protapirinus
- †Hoplia
  - †Hoplia striatipennis – type locality for species
- †Hoplisidia – type locality for genus
  - †Hoplisidia kohliana – type locality for species
- †Hoplocampa
  - †Hoplocampa ilicis – type locality for species
- †Hoplochelys
  - †Hoplochelys crassa
- †Horistonotus
  - †Horistonotus coloradensis – type locality for species
- †Hormorus
  - †Hormorus saxorum – type locality for species
- †Humulus
  - †Humulus florissantellus
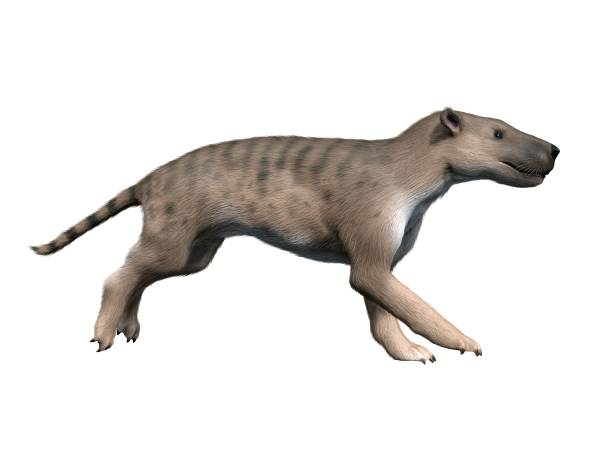
- Life restoration of the Eocene-Miocene creodont mammal Hyaenodon
  †Hyaenodon
  - †Hyaenodon crucians
  - †Hyaenodon horridus
  - †Hyaenodon mustelinus
- †Hydnobius
  - †Hydnobius tibialis – type locality for species
- Hydraena
  - †Hydraena circulata – or unidentified comparable form
- Hydrangea
  - †Hydrangea antica
  - †Hydrangea fraxinifolia
- Hydriomena – tentative report
  - †Hydriomena? protrita – type locality for species
- Hydrobius
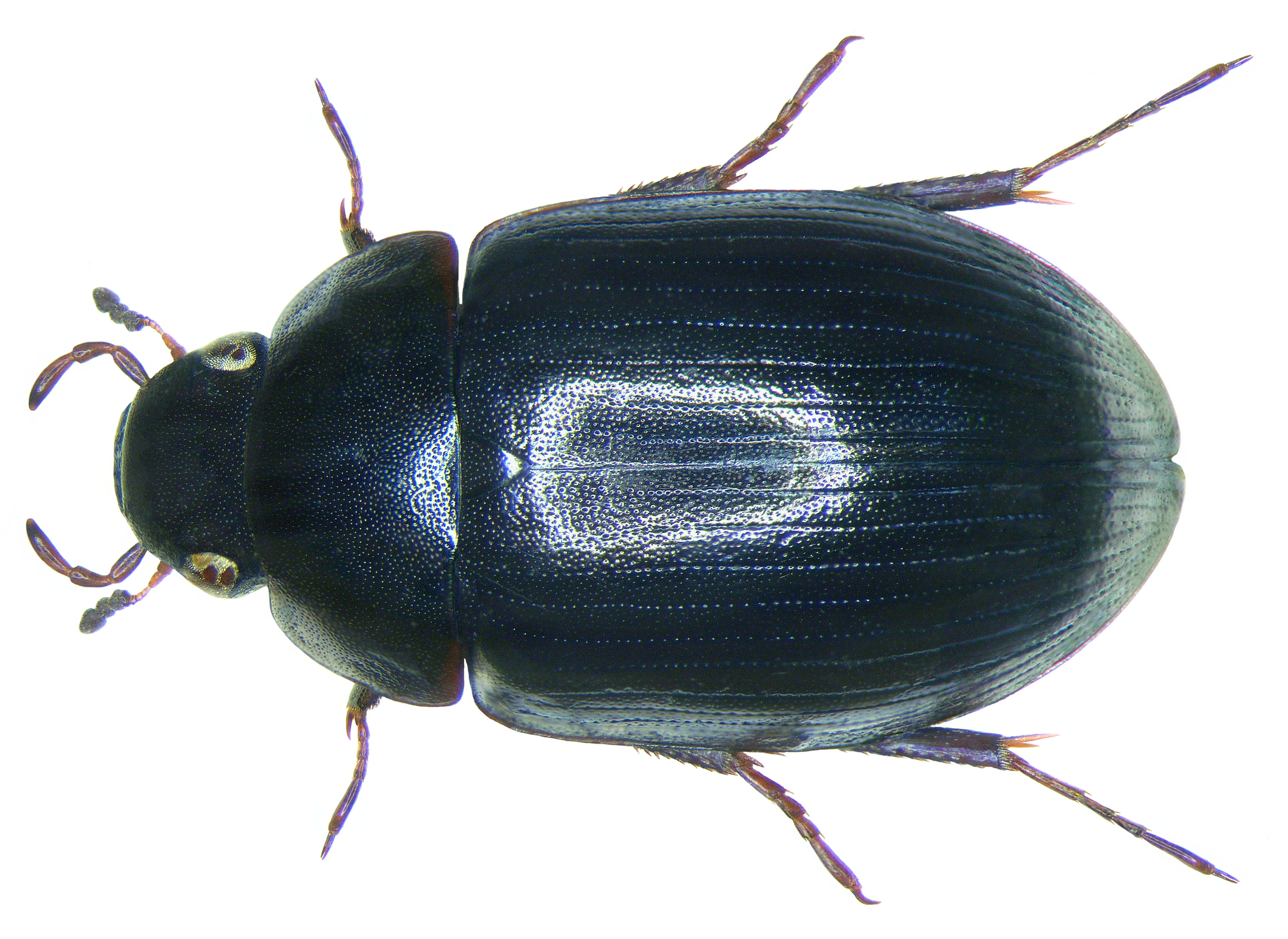
  - A living Hydrobius fuscipes water scavenger beetle
    †Hydrobius fuscipes
  - †Hydrobius maceratus – type locality for species
  - †Hydrobius prisconatator – type locality for species
  - †Hydrobius titan – type locality for species
- †Hydromystria
  - †Hydromystria expansa
- Hydrophilus
  - †Hydrophilus extricatus – type locality for species
- Hydroporus
  - †Hydroporus sedimentorum – type locality for species
- Hydropsyche
  - †Hydropsyche marcens – type locality for species
  - †Hydropsyche operta – type locality for species
  - †Hydropsyche scudderi – type locality for species
- †Hydroptila
  - †Hydroptila phileos – type locality for species
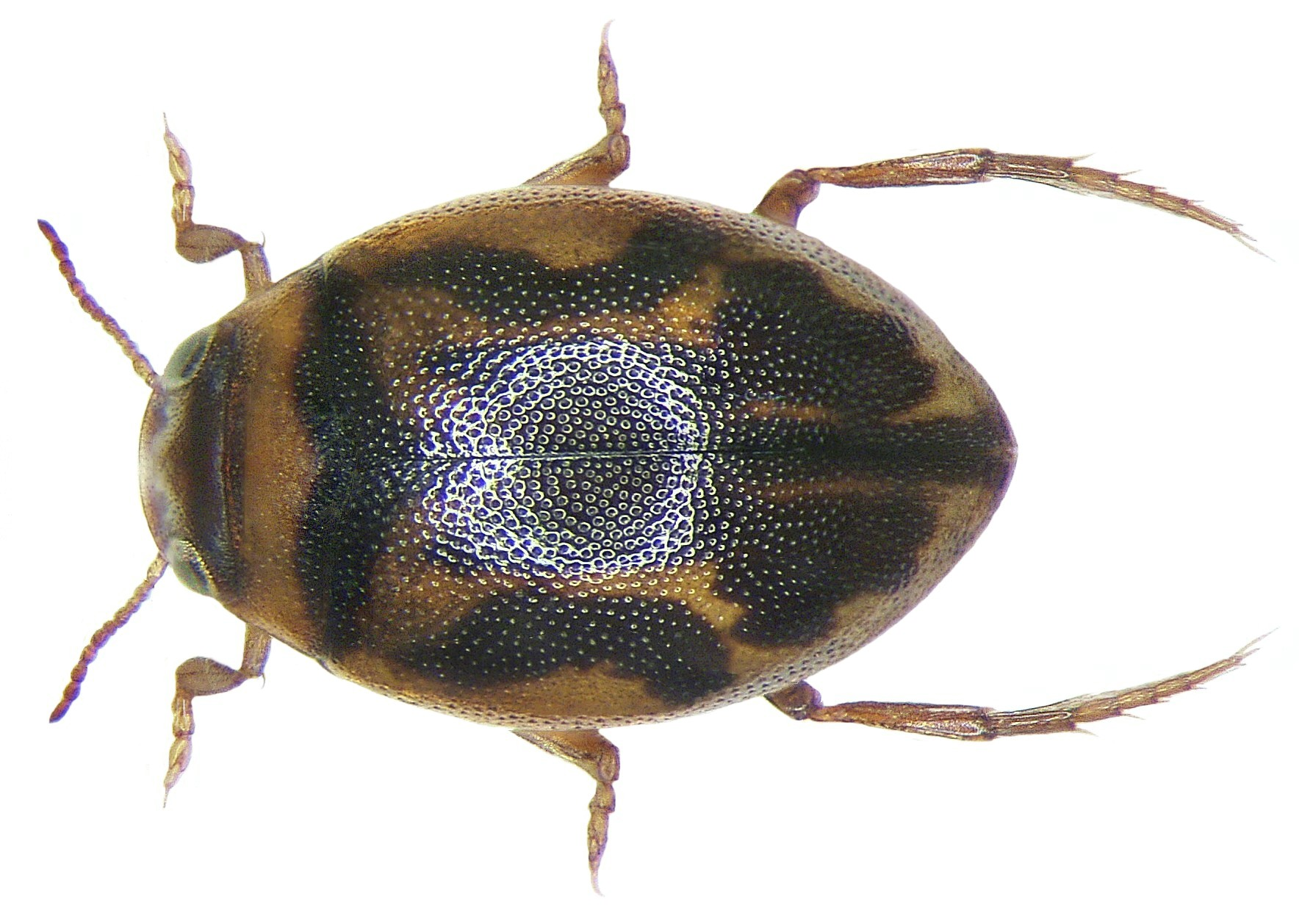
- A living Hygrotus predaceous diving beetle
  Hygrotus
  - †Hygrotus miocenus – type locality for species
- Hylastes
  - †Hylastes americanus – type locality for species
  - †Hylastes nigrinus
- †Hylesinus – type locality for genus
  - †Hylesinus dormiscens – type locality for species
  - †Hylesinus extractus – type locality for species
  - †Hylesinus hydropicus – type locality for species
- †Hylobius
  - †Hylobius lacoei – type locality for species
- †Hylomeryx
- Hylurgops
  - †Hylurgops piger – type locality for species
- †Hymenophyllum
  - †Hymenophyllum confusum
- †Hymenorus
  - †Hymenorus haydeni – type locality for species
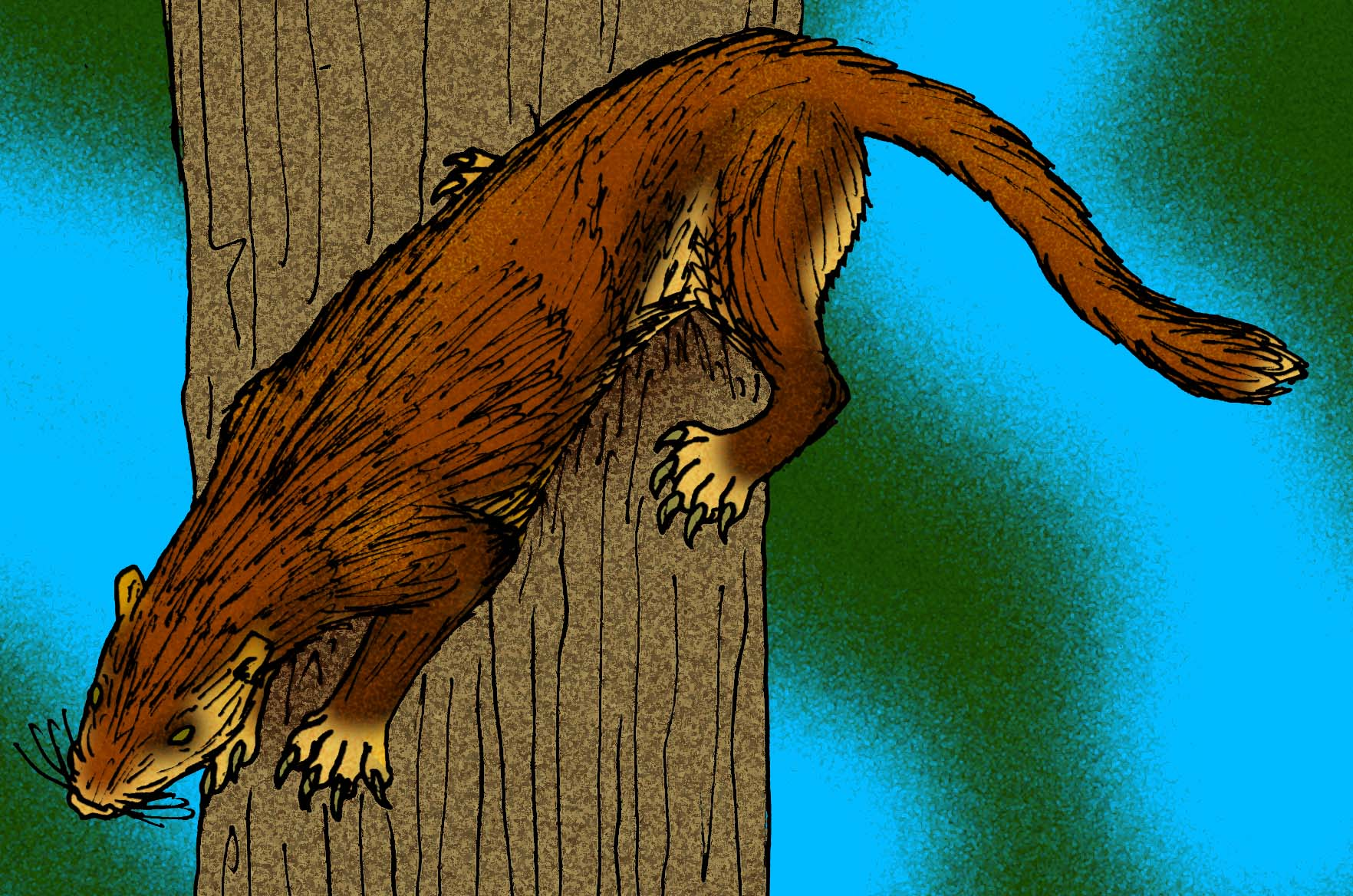
- Life restoration of the Eocene odd-toed ungulate Hyopsodus
  †Hyopsodus
  - †Hyopsodus loomisi
  - †Hyopsodus lysitensis
  - †Hyopsodus paulus
  - †Hyopsodus powellianus
  - †Hyopsodus simplex
  - †Hyopsodus walcottianus
  - †Hyopsodus wortmani
- †Hypertragulus
  - †Hypertragulus calcaratus
- †Hypisodus
  - †Hypisodus minimus
- Hypnum
  - †Hypnum coloradense
  - †Hypnum haydenii
- †Hypohippus
  - †Hypohippus osborni – type locality for species
- †Hypolagus
- †Hyporhina
  - †Hyporhina galbreathi – type locality for species
- †Hyposodus
  - †Hyposodus loomisi
- †Hyrachyus
  - †Hyrachyus modestus
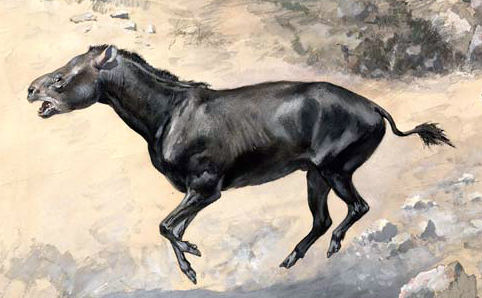
- Life restoration of the Eocene-Oligocene odd-toed ungulate Hyracodon. Charles R. Knight (1896).
  †Hyracodon
  - †Hyracodon arcidens – type locality for species
  - †Hyracodon leidyanus
  - †Hyracodon nebraskensis
- †Hyracotherium
  - †Hyracotherium vasacciense
- †Hystricops

== I ==
- †Ichneumon
  - †Ichneumon alpha – type locality for species
  - †Ichneumon concretus – type locality for species
  - †Ichneumon decrepitus – type locality for species
  - †Ichneumon dormitans – type locality for species
  - †Ichneumon exesus – type locality for species
  - †Ichneumon obduratus – type locality for species
  - †Ichneumon petrinus – type locality for species
  - †Ichneumon pollens – type locality for species
  - †Ichneumon primigenius – type locality for species
  - †Ichneumon provectus – type locality for species
  - †Ichneumon somniatus – type locality for species
  - †Ichneumon torpefactus – type locality for species
- †Ignacius
  - †Ignacius frugivorus
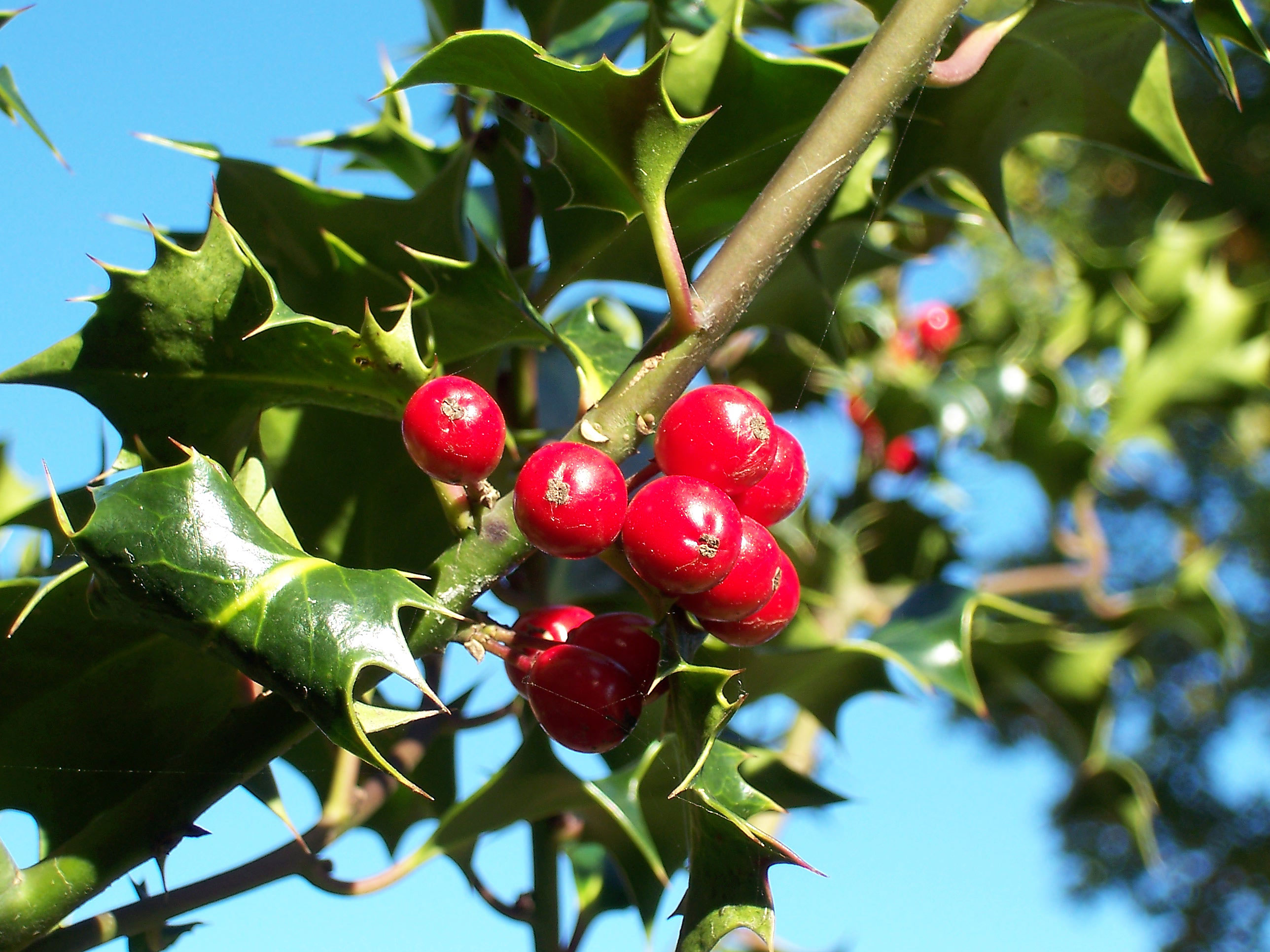
- Foliage and fruit of a living Ilex, or holly
  Ilex
  - †Ilex artocarpidioides
  - †Ilex knightiaefolia
  - †Ilex pseudostenophylla – type locality for species. Later reclassified in the new genus Frangulops.
- †Indusia
  - †Indusia cypridis – type locality for species
- †Iridomyrmex
  - †Iridomyrmex florissantius – type locality for species
  - †Iridomyrmex obscurans – type locality for species
- Ischnoptera
  - †Ischnoptera brunneri – type locality for species
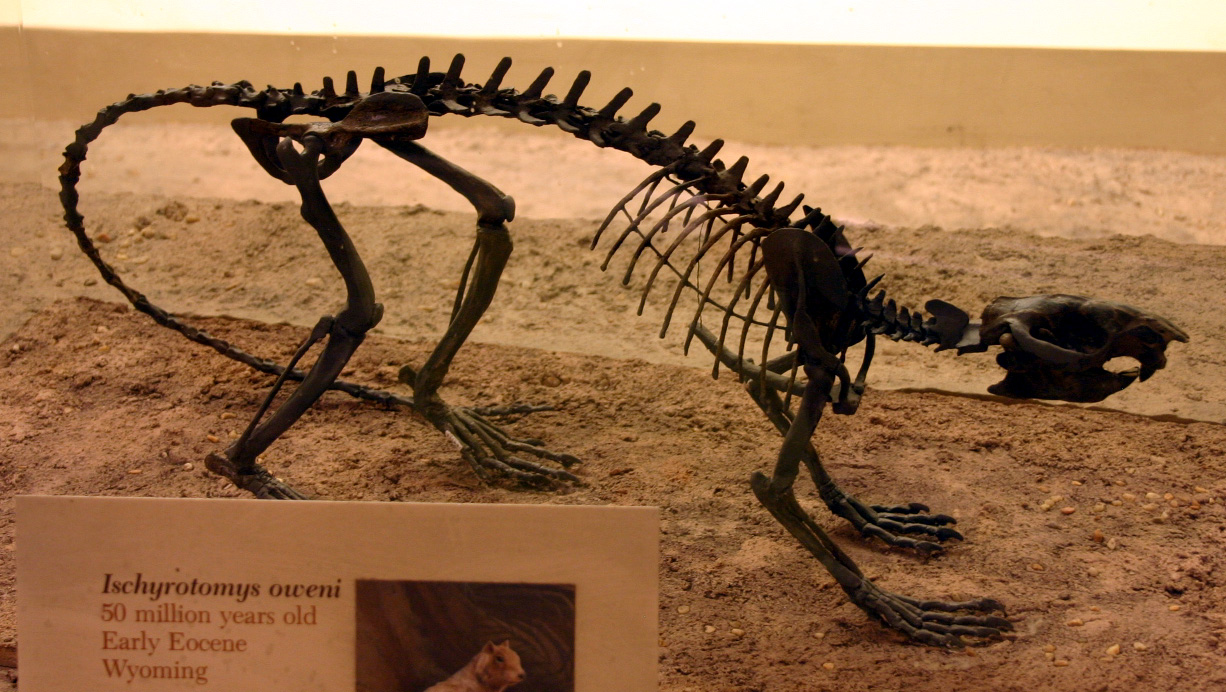
- Mounted fossilized skeleton of the Eocene-Oligocene rodent Ischyromys
  †Ischyromys
  - †Ischyromys douglassi – or unidentified comparable form
  - †Ischyromys typus
  - †Ischyromys veterior – or unidentified comparable form
- †Isectolophus
  - †Isectolophus annectens
- †Isoetites
  - †Isoetites horridus
- †Isomira
  - †Isomira aurora – type locality for species
  - †Isomira florissantensis – type locality for species
- †Isothea – type locality for genus
  - †Isothea alleni – type locality for species
- †Isotrilophus
  - †Isotrilophus rasnitsyni – type locality for species
- †Iulus
  - †Iulus florissantellus – type locality for species

== J ==
- †Jadera
  - †Jadera interita – type locality for species
- †Janus
  - †Janus disperditus – type locality for species
- †Jassopsis – type locality for genus
  - †Jassopsis evidens – type locality for species
- Jassus – tentative report. Lapsus calami of Iassus.
  - †"Jassus" latebrae – type locality for species
- †Judolia
  - †Judolia antecurrens – type locality for species
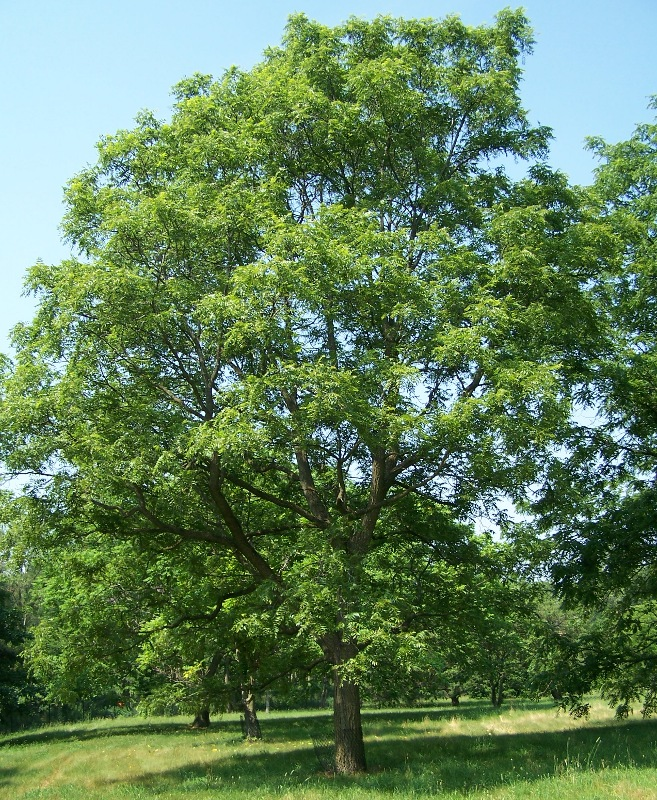
- A living Juglans, or walnut tree
  Juglans
  - †Juglans berryana
- Junco
  - †Junco hyemalis
- †Juncus
  - †Juncus crassulus
- †Jungermanniopsis
  - †Jungermanniopsis cockerellii
- †Jupitellia – type locality for genus
  - †Jupitellia charon – type locality for species

== K ==
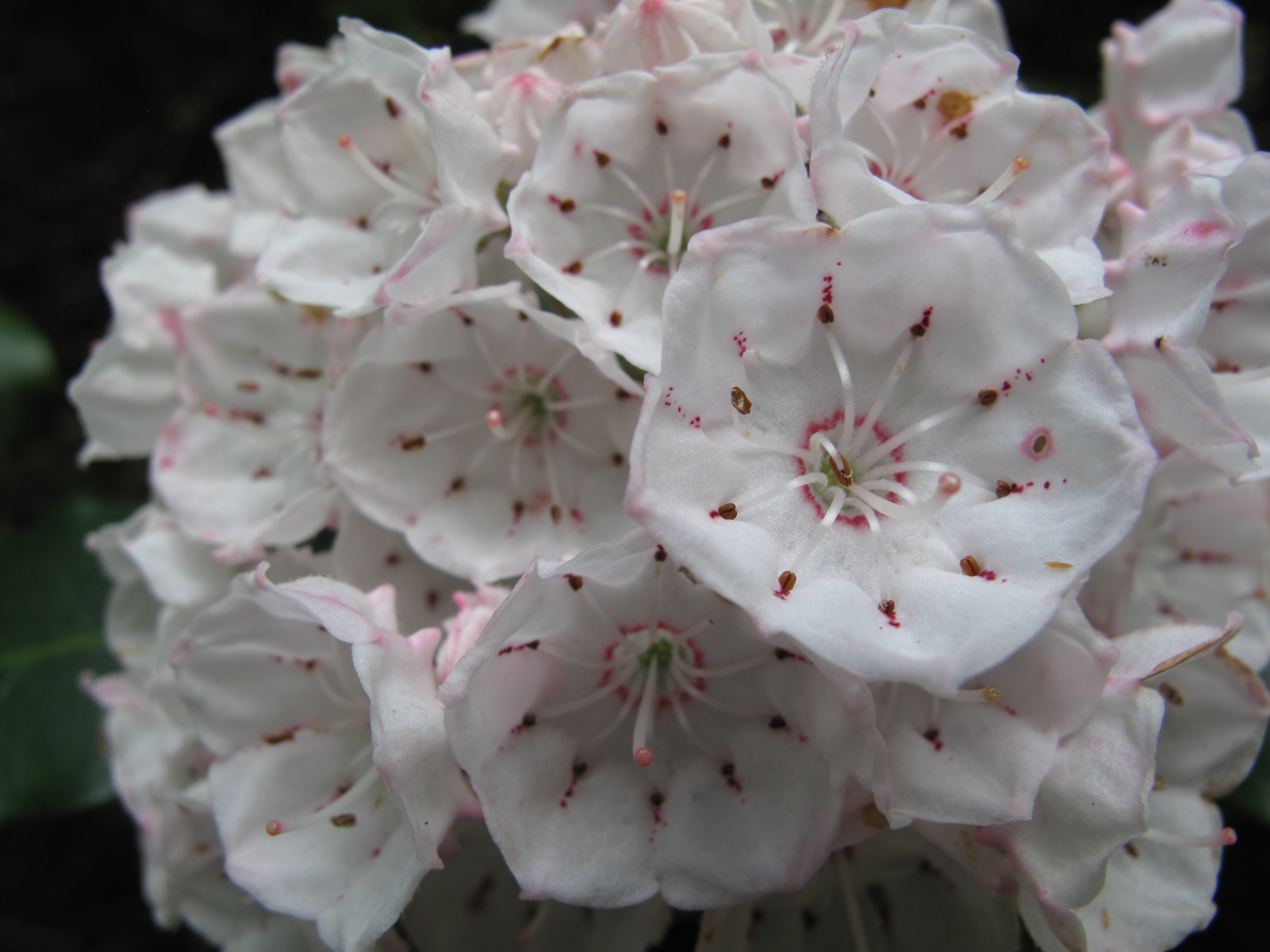
- Flowers of a living Kalmia shrub
  †Kalmia
  - †Kalmia elliptica
- †Kimbetohia
  - †Kimbetohia mziae – type locality for species
- †Knightomys
  - †Knightomys depressus
  - †Knightomys huerfanensis
- Koelreuteria
  - †Koelreuteria alleni
- †Kohlsimyrma – type locality for genus
  - †Kohlsimyrma gracilis – type locality for species
  - †Kohlsimyrma laticeps – type locality for species
  - †Kohlsimyrma longiceps – type locality for species
- †Kronolictus – type locality for genus
  - †Kronolictus scudderiellus – type locality for species
  - †Kronolictus vulcanus – type locality for species

== L ==
- †Laasbium – type locality for genus
  - †Laasbium agassizii – type locality for species
  - †Laasbium sectile – type locality for species
- †Labandeiraia – type locality for genus
  - †Labandeiraia americaborealis – type locality for species
- †Labidolemur
  - †Labidolemur kayi
  - †Labidolemur serus
  - †Labidolemur soricoides – type locality for species
- †Labiduromma
  - †Labiduromma avia – type locality for species
  - †Labiduromma bormansi – type locality for species
- †Laccopygus – type locality for genus
  - †Laccopygus nilesii – type locality for species
- †Lachnopus
  - †Lachnopus humatus – type locality for species
  - †Lachnopus recuperatus – type locality for species
- †Lacon
  - †Lacon exhumatus – type locality for species
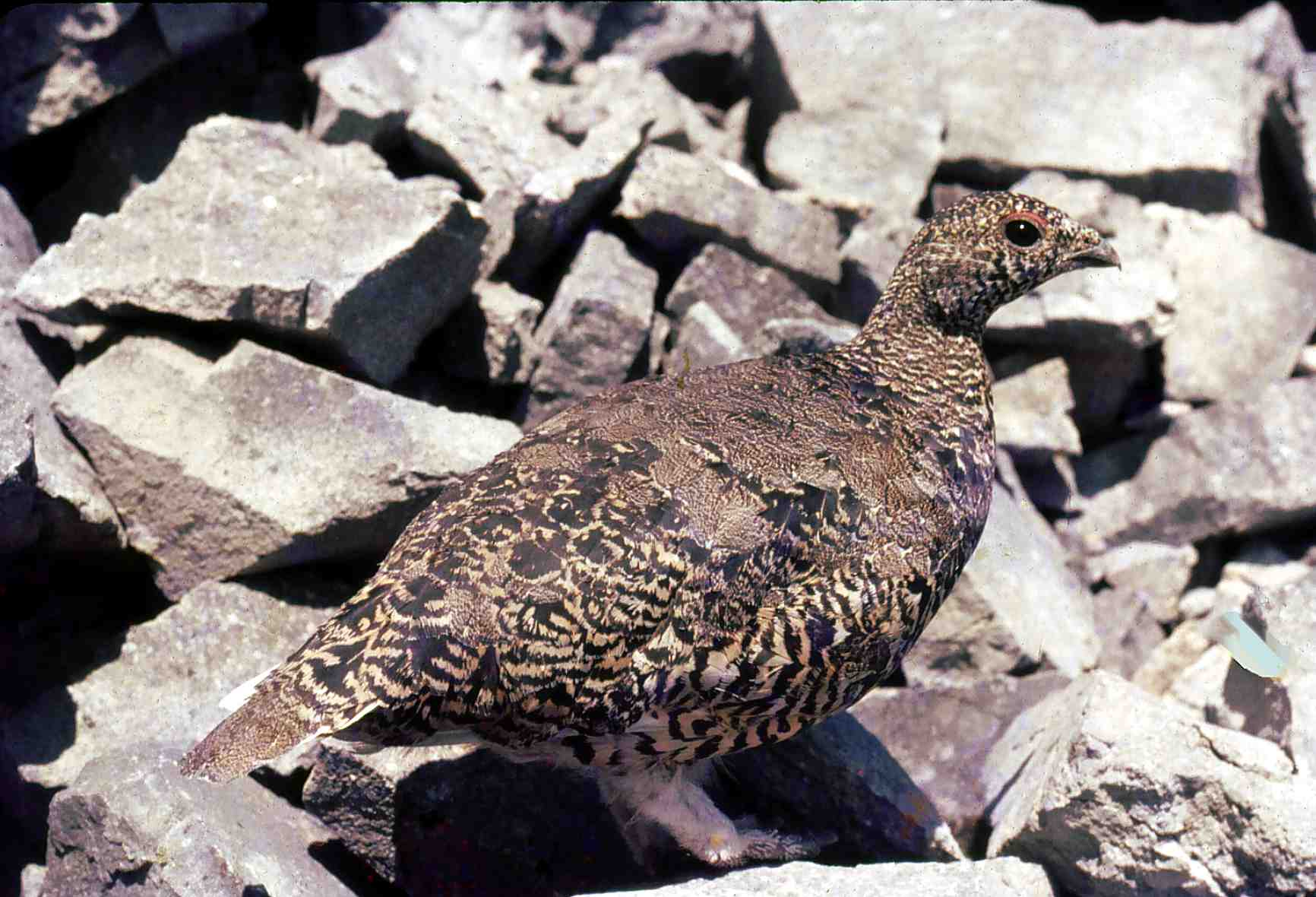
- A living Lagopus leucura, or white-tailed ptarmigan, in full summer plumage
  †Lagopus
  - †Lagopus leucurus
- †Lambdotherium
  - †Lambdotherium popoagicum – type locality for species
- †Lampronota
  - †Lampronota pristina – type locality for species
  - †Lampronota stygialis – type locality for species
  - †Lampronota tenebrosa – type locality for species
- †Lapton
  - †Lapton daemon – type locality for species
- Larus
- †Lasiopa
  - †Lasiopa carpenteri – type locality for species
- Lasiopodomys
  - †Lasiopodomys deceitensis
- Lasius
  - †Lasius peritulus – type locality for species
- †Lastrea
  - †Lastrea goldiana
- Lathrobium
  - †Lathrobium antediluvianum – type locality for species
- †Laurophyllum
  - †Laurophyllum caudatum
  - †Laurophyllum perseanum
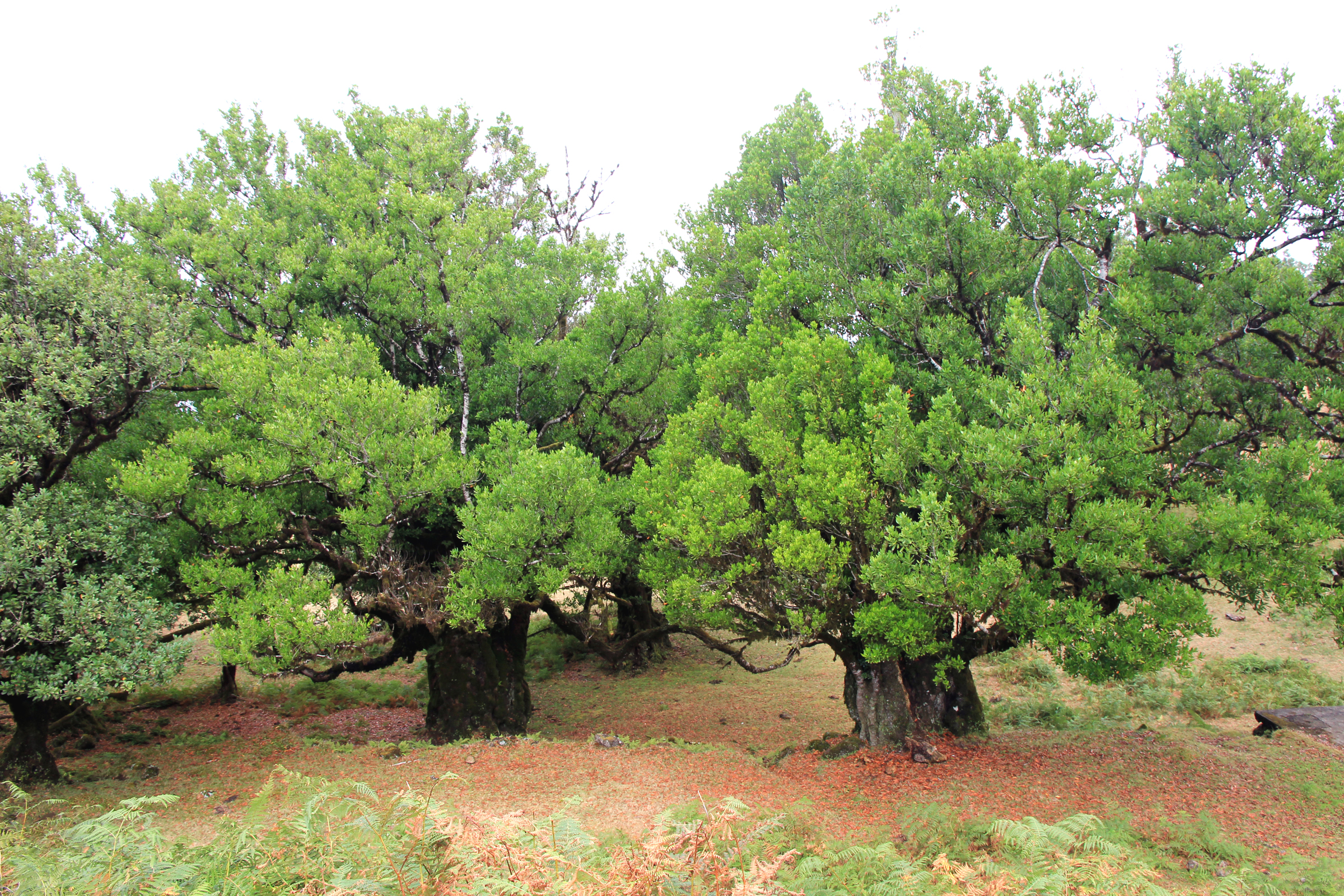
- Living Laurus, or laurel trees
  Laurus
  - †Laurus socialis
- †Lebia
  - †Lebia protospiloptera – type locality for species
- †Leguminosites
  - †Leguminosites coloradensis
  - †Leguminosites lespedezoides – type locality for species
  - †Leguminosites lesquereuxiana
- †Leia
  - †Leia miocenica – type locality for species
- †Lema
  - †Lema evanescens – type locality for species
  - †Lema fortior – type locality for species
  - †Lema lesquereuxi – type locality for species
- Lemmiscus
  - †Lemmiscus curtatus
- †Lepismophlebia
  - †Lepismophlebia platymera – type locality for species
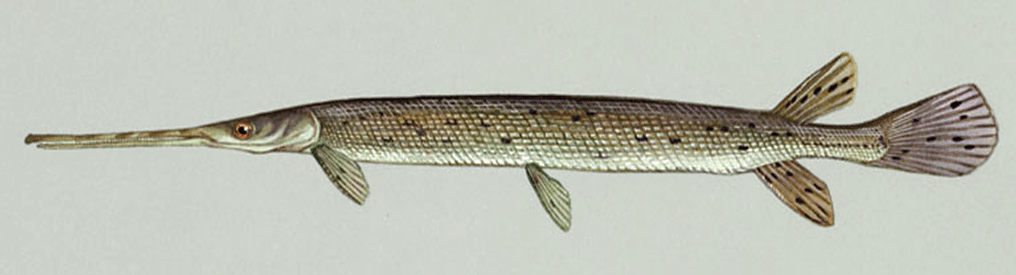
- Illustration of a living Lepisosteus, or gar
  Lepisosteus
- †Leptacinus
  - †Leptacinus exsucidus – type locality for species
  - †Leptacinus fossus – type locality for species
  - †Leptacinus leidyi – type locality for species
  - †Leptacinus maclurei – type locality for species
  - †Leptacinus rigatus – type locality for species
- †Leptacodon
  - †Leptacodon tener – type locality for species
- †Leptarctus
  - †Leptarctus primus
- †Leptauchenia
  - †Leptauchenia decora
  - †Leptauchenia major
- †Leptis
  - †Leptis mystaceaeformis – type locality for species
- †Leptobatopsis
  - †Leptobatopsis ashmeadii – type locality for species
- †Leptobrochus – type locality for genus
  - †Leptobrochus luteus – type locality for species
- †Leptochoerus
  - †Leptochoerus spectabilis
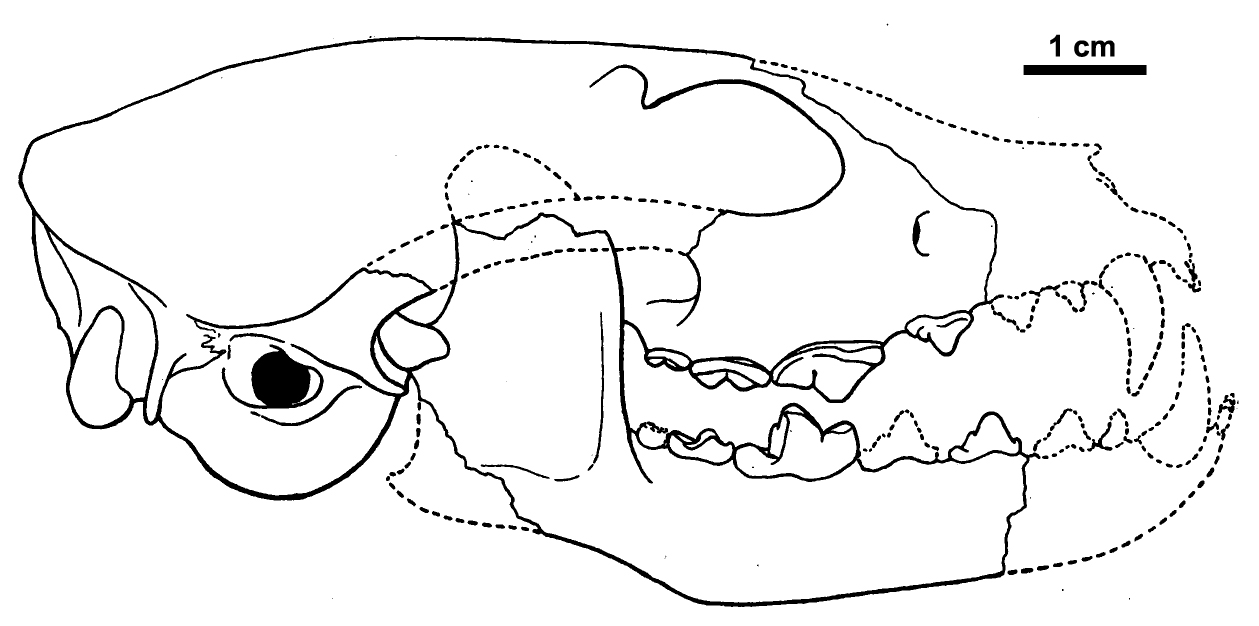
- Illustration of a fossilized skull of the Oligocene-Miocene dog Leptocyon
  †Leptocyon
  - †Leptocyon vafer
- †Leptogaster
  - †Leptogaster prior – type locality for species
- †Leptomeryx
  - †Leptomeryx esulcatus
  - †Leptomeryx evansi
  - †Leptomeryx speciosus
- †Leptomorphus
  - †Leptomorphus palaeospilus – type locality for species
- Leptophloeus
  - †Leptophloeus alternans – or unidentified comparable form
- †Leptostylus
  - †Leptostylus scudderi – type locality for species
- †Leptotomus
  - †Leptotomus parvus
- †Leptura
  - †Leptura petrorum – type locality for species
  - †Leptura ponderosissima – type locality for species
  - †Leptura wickhami – type locality for species
- Lepus
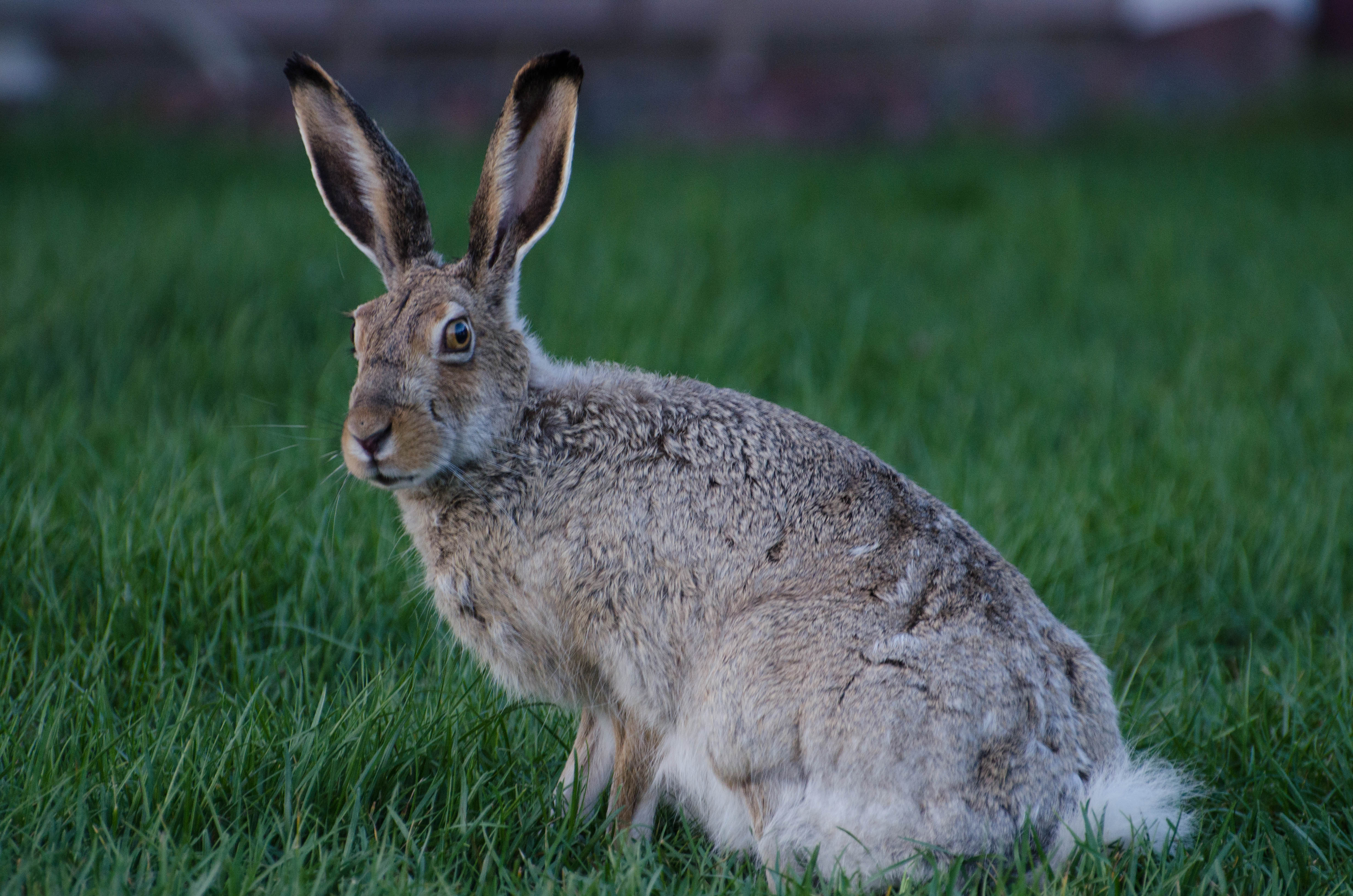
  - A living Lepus townsendii, or white-tailed jackrabbit
    †Lepus townsendii
- †Lestomyia
  - †Lestomyia miocenica – type locality for species
- †Leucosticte
  - †Leucosticte atrata
  - †Leucosticte tephrocotis
- †Leucozona
  - †Leucozona nigra – type locality for species
- †Libellulapis – type locality for genus
  - †Libellulapis antiquorum – type locality for species
  - †Libellulapis wilmattae – type locality for species
- †Lichnanthe
  - †Lichnanthe defuncta – type locality for species
- †Ligyrocoris
  - †Ligyrocoris exsuctus – type locality for species
- †Ligyrus
  - †Ligyrus compositus – type locality for species
  - †Ligyrus effetus – type locality for species
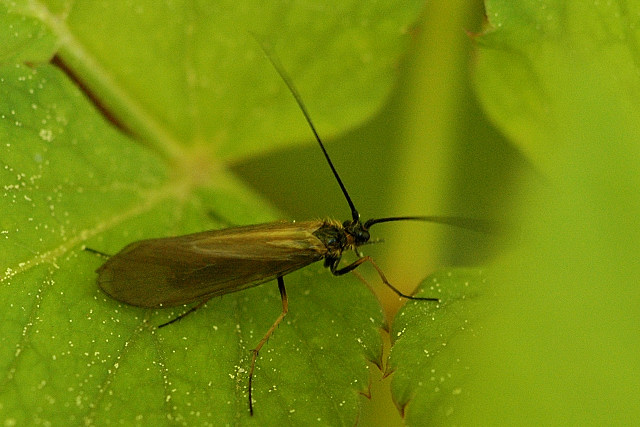
- A living Limnephilus caddisfly
  †Limnephilus
  - †Limnephilus eocenicus – type locality for species
- †Limnerium
  - †Limnerium consuetum – type locality for species
  - †Limnerium depositum – type locality for species
  - †Limnerium plenum – type locality for species
  - †Limnerium tectum – type locality for species
  - †Limnerium vetustum – type locality for species
- †Limnobium
  - †Limnobium obliteratum
- †Limnocema
  - †Limnocema lutescens – type locality for species
  - †Limnocema marcescens – type locality for species
  - †Limnocema mortoni – type locality for species
  - †Limnocema sternbergi – type locality for species
  - †Limnocema styx – type locality for species
- †Limnoecus
  - †Limnoecus compressus
- †Limnophila
  - †Limnophila rogersii – type locality for species
  - †Limnophila vasta – type locality for species
- †Limnophilus
  - †Limnophilus soporatus – type locality for species
- †Limnopsyche – type locality for genus
  - †Limnopsyche dispersa – type locality for species
- †Limonius
  - †Limonius aboriginalis – type locality for species
  - †Limonius florissantensis – type locality for species
  - †Limonius praecursor – type locality for species
  - †Limonius shoshonis – type locality for species
  - †Limonius volans – type locality for species
- Lindera
  - †Lindera coloradica – type locality for species
  - †Lindera obtusata
  - †Lindera varifolia – type locality for species
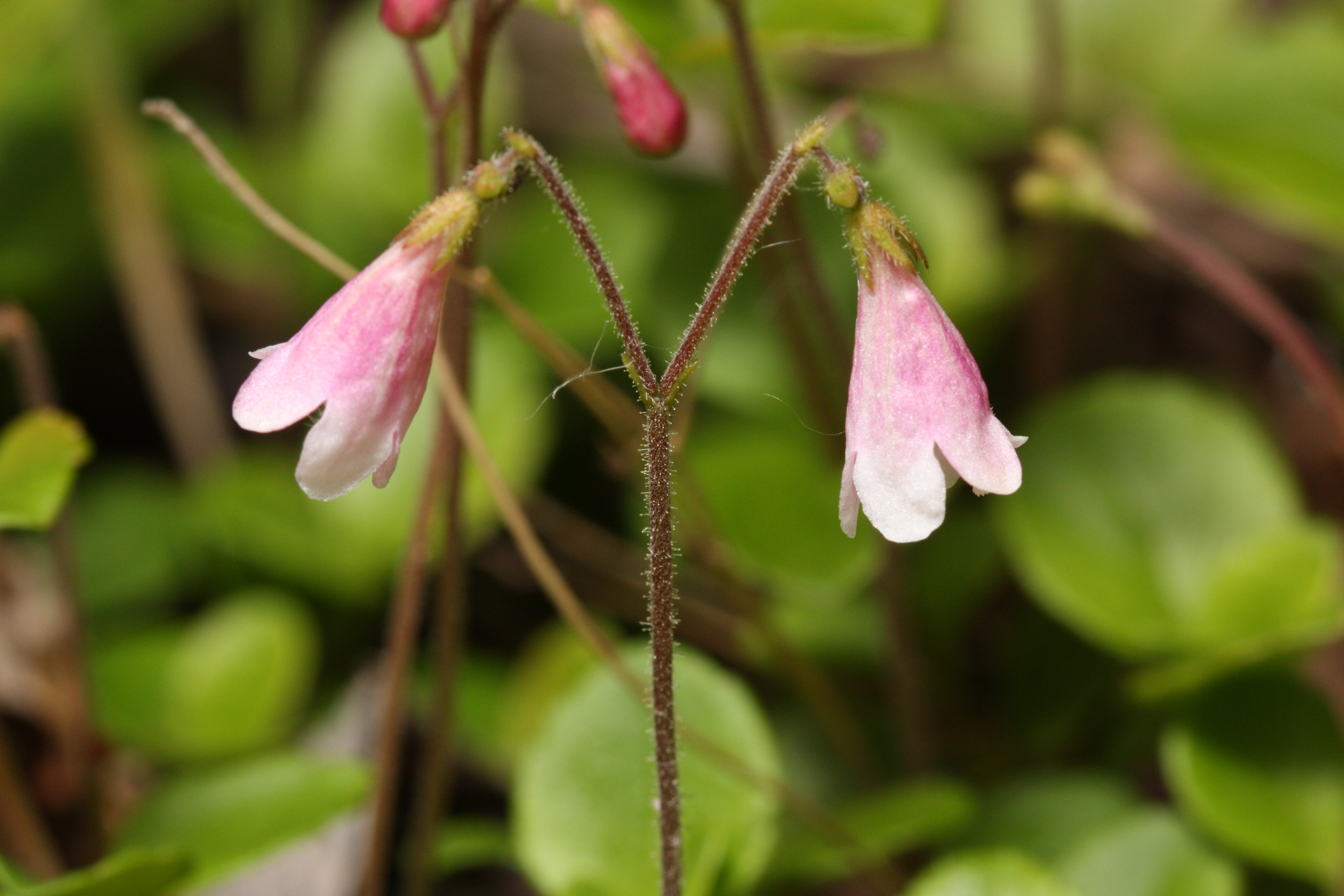
- Flowers of a living Linnaea
  †Linnaea – type locality for genus
  - †Linnaea abolita – type locality for species
  - †Linnaea carcerata – type locality for species
  - †Linnaea evoluta – type locality for species
  - †Linnaea gravida – type locality for species
  - †Linnaea holmesii – type locality for species
  - †Linnaea putnami – type locality for species
- †Linyphia
  - †Linyphia byrami – type locality for species
  - †Linyphia florissanti – type locality for species
  - †Linyphia pachygnathoides – type locality for species
  - †Linyphia retensa – type locality for species
  - †Linyphia seclusa – type locality for species
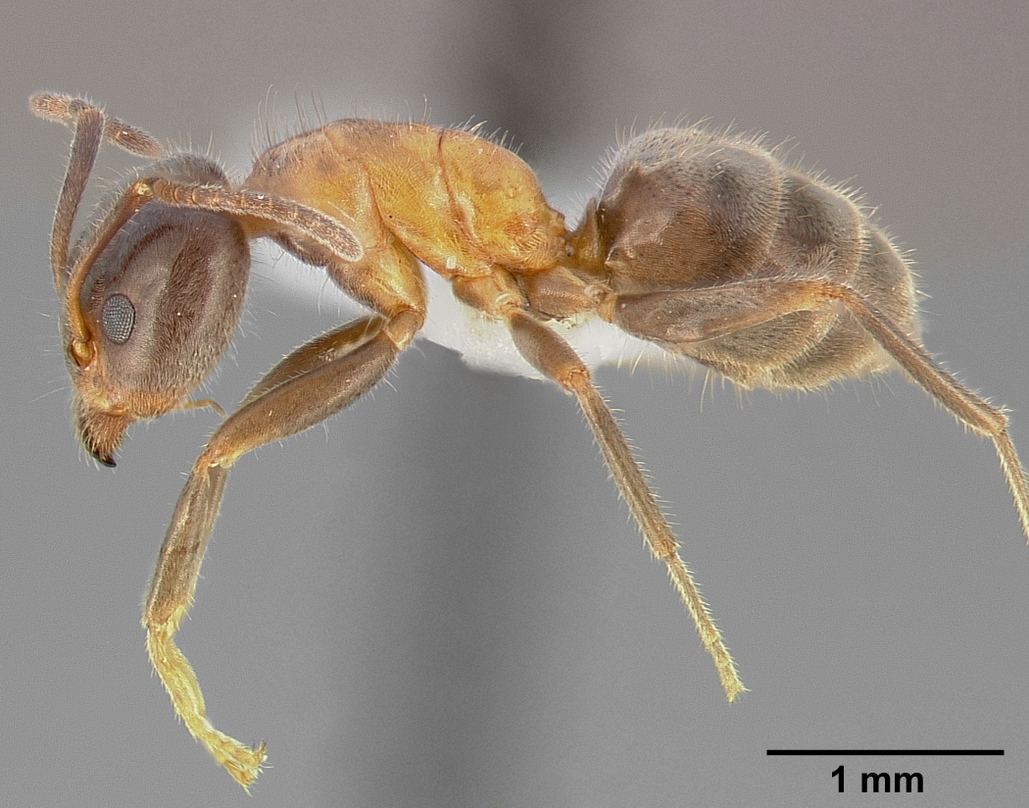
- Preserved Liometopum ant
  †Liometopum
  - †Liometopum miocenicum – type locality for species
  - †Liometopum scudderi – type locality for species
- †Listrochelus
  - †Listrochelus puerilis – type locality for species
- †Listroderes
  - †Listroderes differens – type locality for species
  - †Listroderes evisceratus – type locality for species
- †Lithagrion
  - †Lithagrion hyalinum – type locality for species
- †Lithandrena – type locality for genus
  - †Lithandrena saxorum – type locality for species
- †Lithanthidium – type locality for genus
  - †Lithanthidium pertriste – type locality for species
- †Lithecphora – type locality for genus
  - †Lithecphora diaphana – type locality for species
  - †Lithecphora murata – type locality for species
  - †Lithecphora setigera – type locality for species
  - †Lithecphora unicolor – type locality for species
- †Lithembia
  - †Lithembia florissantensis – type locality for species
- †Litheuphaea
  - †Litheuphaea coloradensis – type locality for species
- †Lithocharis
  - †Lithocharis scottii – type locality for species
- †Lithochromus – type locality for genus
  - †Lithochromus extraneus – type locality for species
  - †Lithochromus gardneri – type locality for species
  - †Lithochromus mortuarius – type locality for species
  - †Lithochromus obstrictus – type locality for species
- †Lithocicada – type locality for genus
  - †Lithocicada perita – type locality for species
- †Lithocoris – type locality for genus
  - †Lithocoris evulsus – type locality for species
- †Lithocoryne – type locality for genus
  - †Lithocoryne arcuata – type locality for species
  - †Lithocoryne coloradensis – type locality for species
  - †Lithocoryne gravis – type locality for species
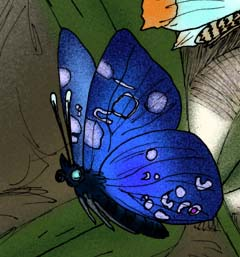
- Life restoration of the Eocene butterfly Lithodryas
  †Lithodryas – type locality for genus
  - †Lithodryas styx – type locality for species
- †Lithogryllites
  - †Lithogryllites lutzii – type locality for species
- †Litholabis
  - †Litholabis gilberti – type locality for species
- †Lithomacratria – type locality for genus
  - †Lithomacratria mirabilis – type locality for species
- †Lithomyza – type locality for genus
  - †Lithomyza condita – type locality for species
- †Lithophotina – type locality for genus
  - †Lithophotina costalis – type locality for species
  - †Lithophotina floccosa – type locality for species
- †Lithophthorus – type locality for genus
  - †Lithophthorus rugosicollis – type locality for species
- †Lithopsis
  - †Lithopsis delicata – type locality for species
  - †Lithopsis dubiosa – type locality for species
  - †Lithopsis fimbriata – or unidentified comparable form
  - †Lithopsis simillima – type locality for species
- †Lithoserix – type locality for genus
  - †Lithoserix williamsi – type locality for species
- †Lithosmylus
  - †Lithosmylus columbianus – type locality for species
- †Lithotiphia – type locality for genus
  - †Lithotiphia scudderi – type locality for species
- †Lithymnetes – type locality for genus
  - †Lithymnetes guttatus – type locality for species
- †Litobrochus – type locality for genus
  - †Litobrochus externatus – type locality for species
- †Litomylus
  - †Litomylus ishami
- †Locrites – type locality for genus
  - †Locrites copei – type locality for species
  - †Locrites whitei – type locality for species
- †Locusta
  - †Locusta silens – type locality for species
- Lomatia
- †Lomatites
  - †Lomatites spinosa
- Longitarsus
- Lontra
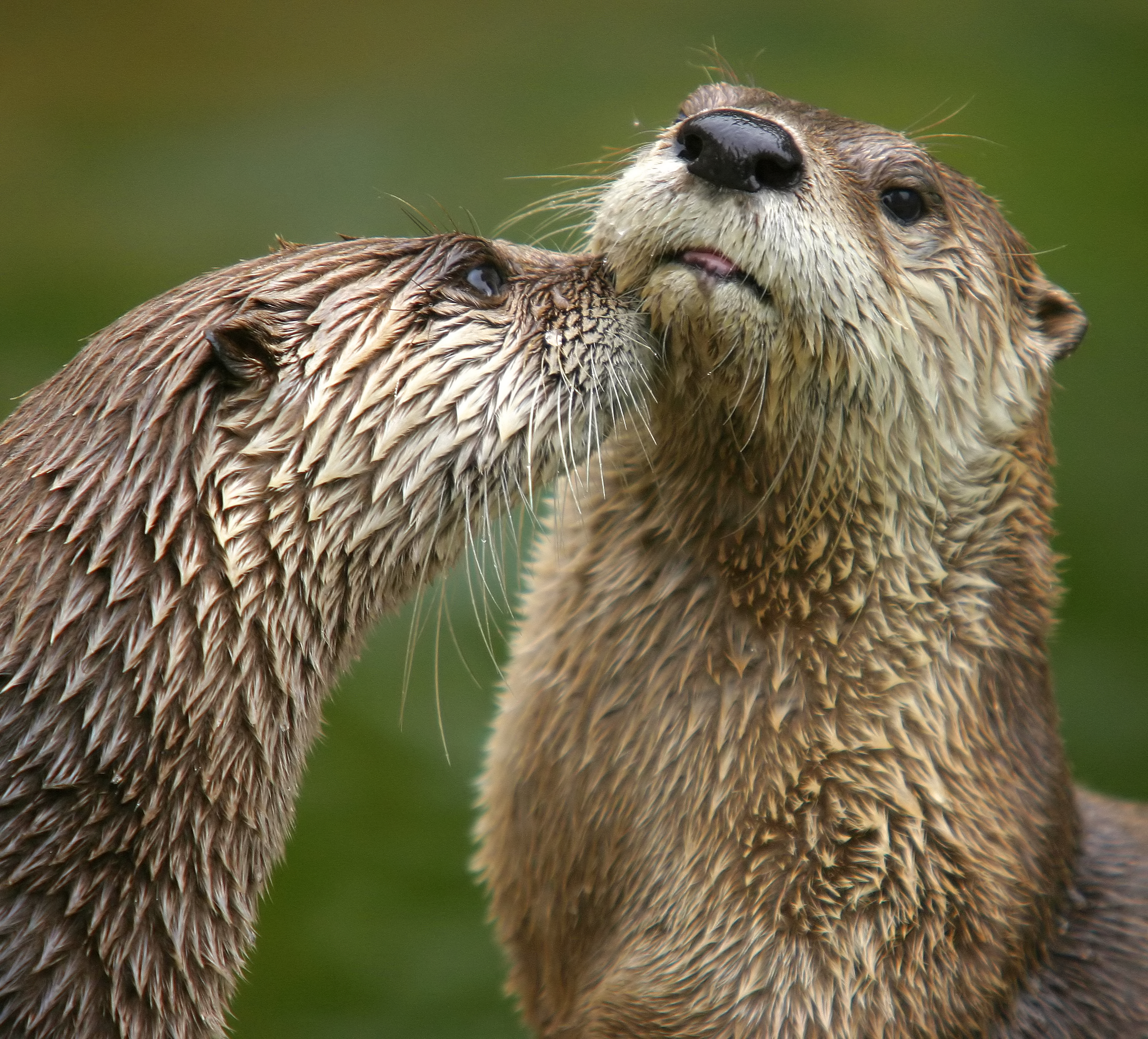
  - Pair of living Lontra canadensis, or North American river otter
    †Lontra canadensis – or unidentified comparable form
- †Lophiparamys
  - †Lophiparamys debequensis
- Lordithon
  - †Lordithon durabilis – type locality for species
  - †Lordithon funditus – type locality for species
  - †Lordithon longiceps
  - †Lordithon lyelli – type locality for species
  - †Lordithon stygis – type locality for species
- †Loveina
  - †Loveina zephyri
- †Lowesaurus
  - †Lowesaurus matthewi – type locality for species
- †Loxolophus
  - †Loxolophus hyattianus
- †Lucanus
  - †Lucanus fossilis – type locality for species
- †Lucidota
  - †Lucidota prima – type locality for species
- †Ludiophanes – type locality for genus
  - †Ludiophanes haydeni – type locality for species
- †Ludius
  - †Ludius exanimatus – type locality for species
  - †Ludius granulicollis – type locality for species
  - †Ludius heeri – type locality for species
  - †Ludius laevissimus – type locality for species
  - †Ludius primitivus – type locality for species
  - †Ludius propheticus – type locality for species
  - †Ludius restructus – type locality for species
  - †Ludius submersus – type locality for species
- †Luperodes
  - †Luperodes submonilis – type locality for species
- †Lutrochites – type locality for genus
  - †Lutrochites lecontei – type locality for species
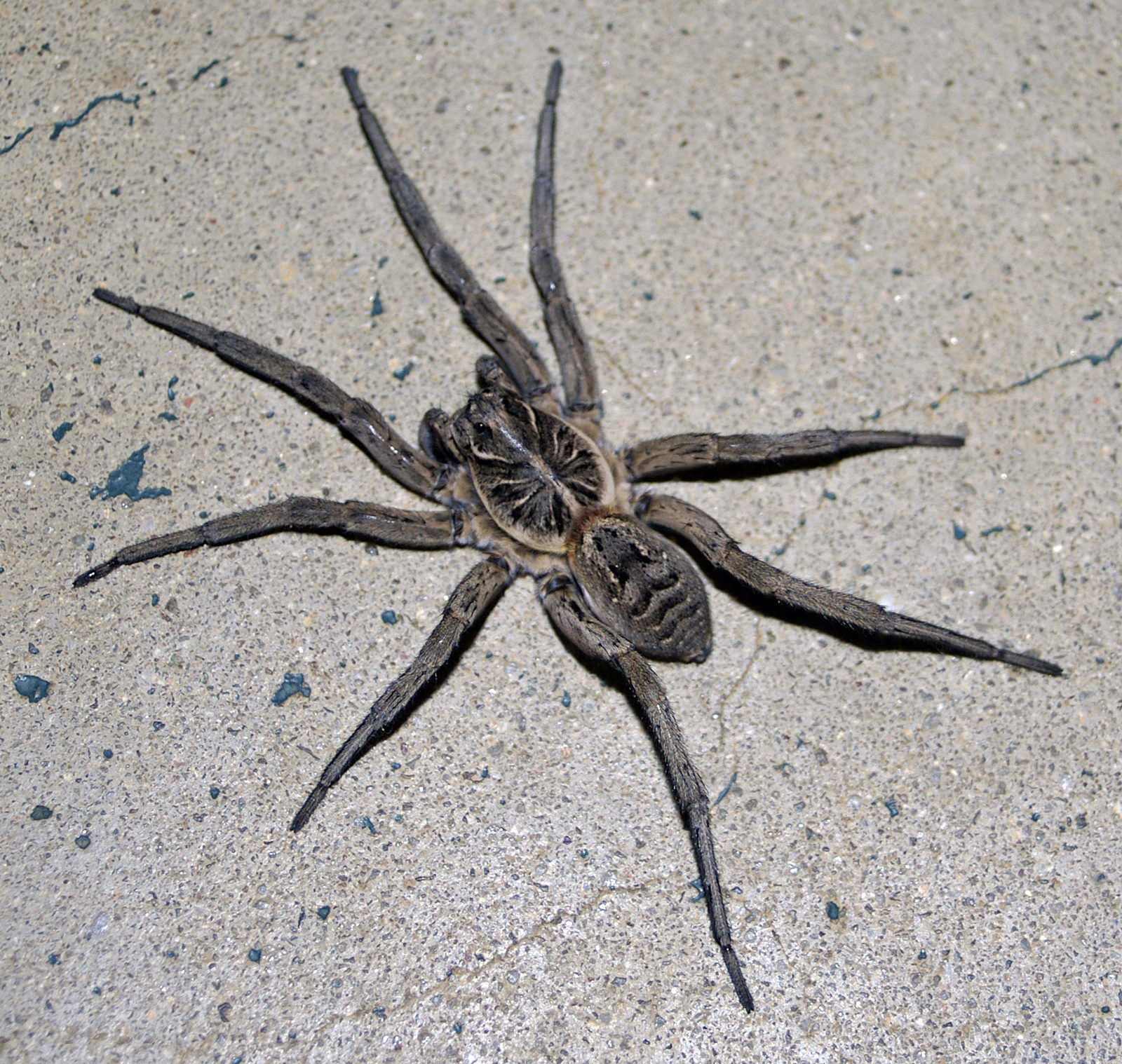
- A living Lycosa wolf spider
  †Lycosa
  - †Lycosa florissanti – type locality for species
- †Lygaeus
  - †Lygaeus faeculentus – type locality for species
  - †Lygaeus obsolescens – type locality for species
  - †Lygaeus stabilitus – type locality for species
- Lygodium
  - †Lygodium coloradense
  - †Lygodium kaulfussi
- Lynx
  - †Lynx rufus
- Lytta
  - †Lytta lithophila – type locality for species

== M ==
- †Macratria
  - †Macratria gigantea – type locality for species
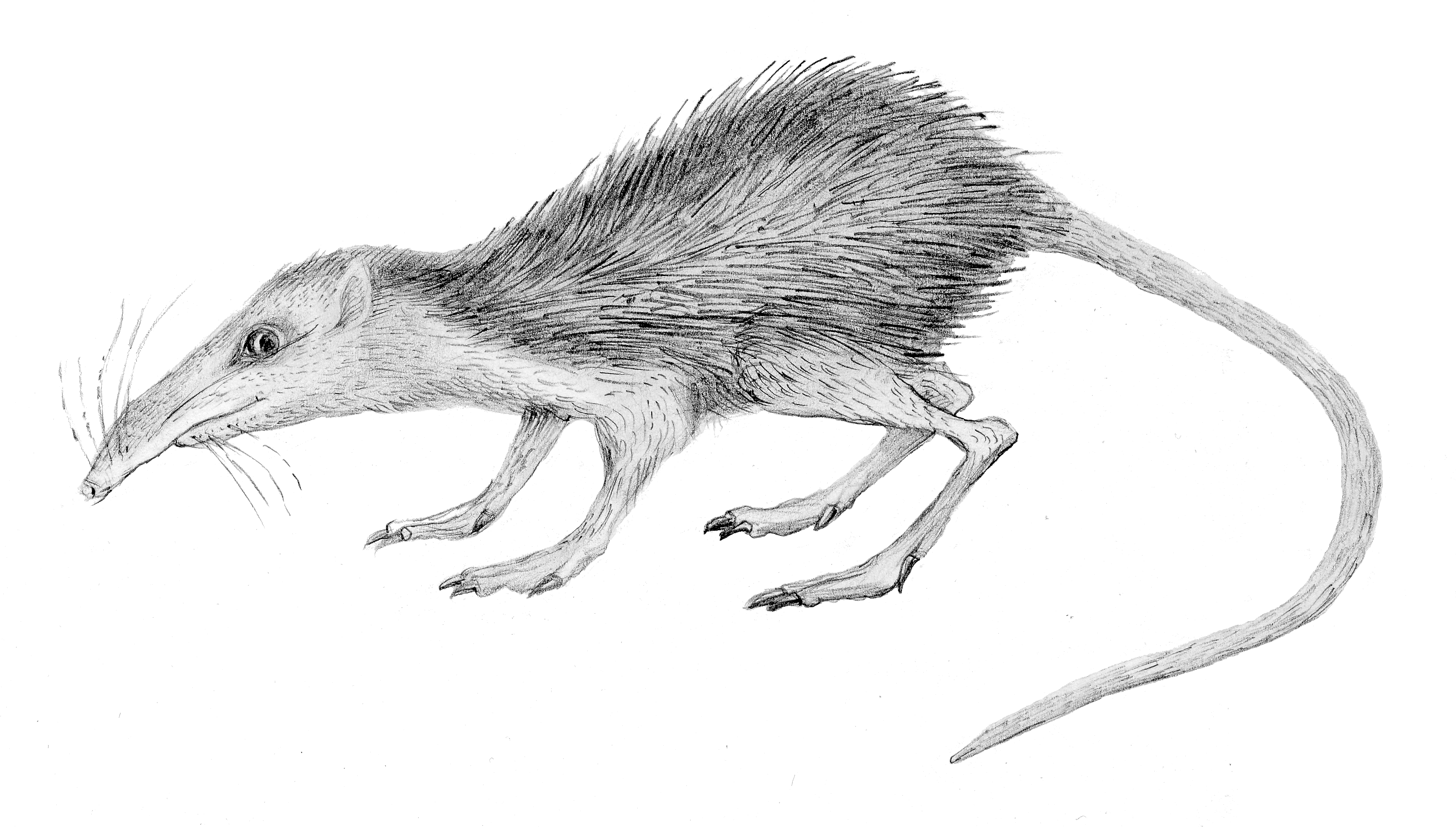
- Life restoration of the Eocene mammal Macrocranion
  Macrocranion
  - †Macrocranion nitens
- †Macrodactylus
  - †Macrodactylus pluto – type locality for species
  - †Macrodactylus propheticus – type locality for species
- †Macrophya
  - †Macrophya pervetusta – type locality for species
- †Macrorhoptus
  - †Macrorhoptus intutus – type locality for species
- Magdalis
  - †Magdalis lecontei
  - †Magdalis sedimentorum – type locality for species
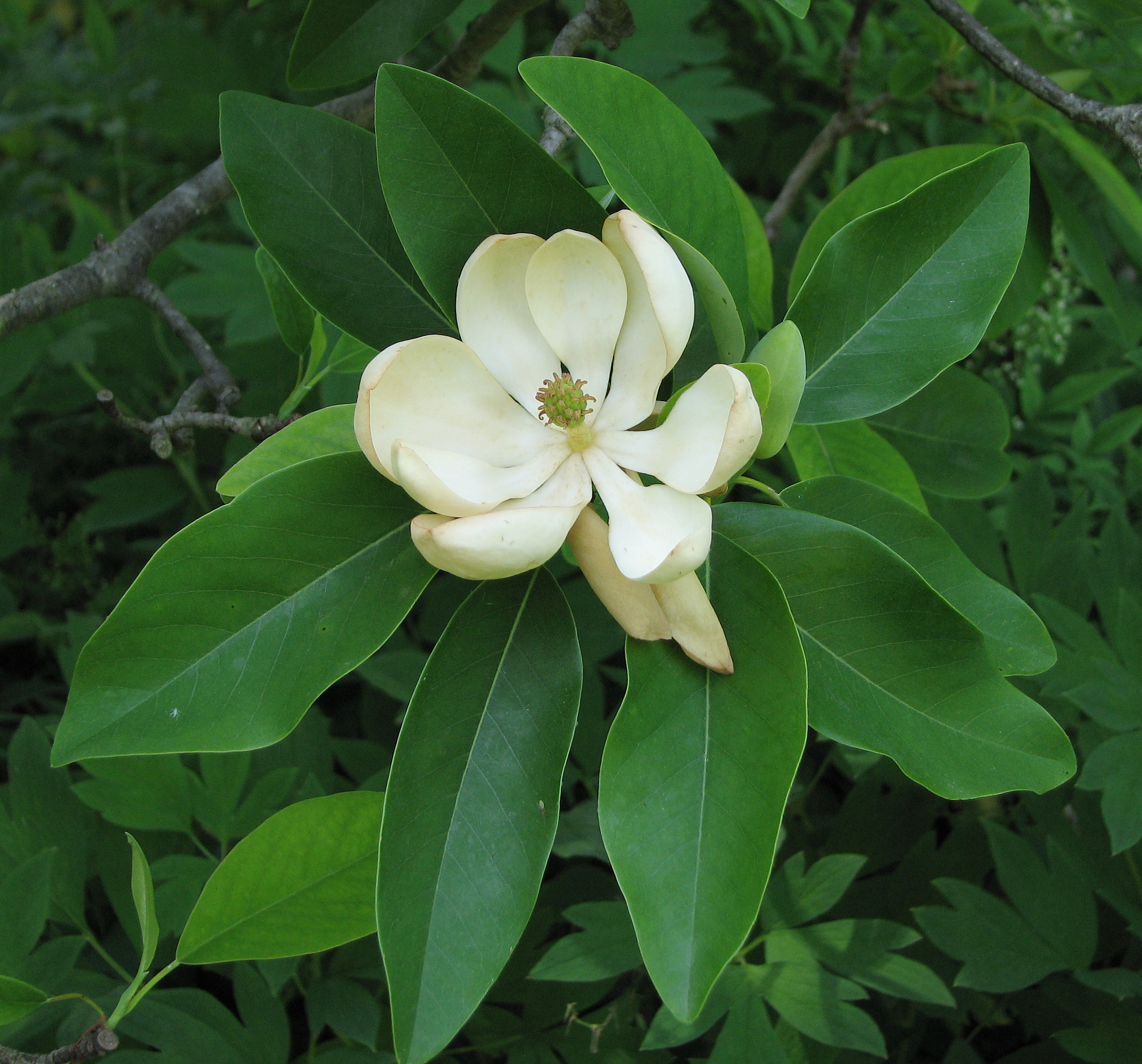
- Close-up view of a Magnolia flower
  Magnolia
  - †Magnolia berryi
  - †Magnolia magnifolia
  - †Magnolia regalis
  - †Magnolia rotundifolia
- Mahonia
  - †Mahonia marginata
  - †Mahonia obliqua – type locality for species
  - †Mahonia subdenticulata
- †Maiorana
- †Malachius
  - †Malachius immurus – type locality for species
- †Malus
  - †Malus florissantensis
  - †Malus pseudocredneria
- †Mammuthus
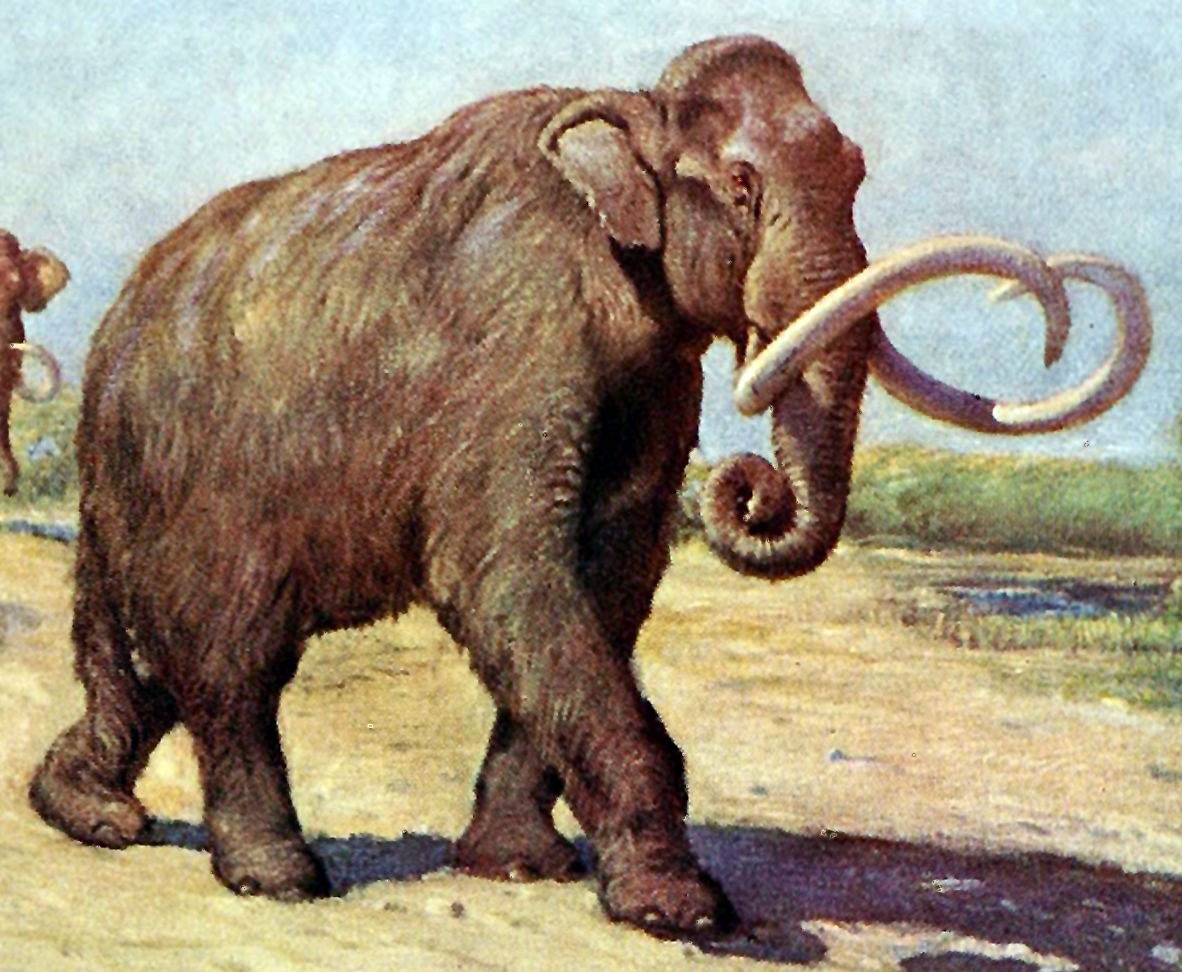
  - Life restoration of a herd of Mammuthus columbi, or Columbian mammoths. The extent of the fur depicted is hypothetical. Charles R. Knight (1909).
    †Mammuthus columbi
- †Manapsis – type locality for genus
  - †Manapsis anomala – type locality for species
- Marmota
  - †Marmota flaviventris
- †Marquettia
  - †Marquettia americana – type locality for species
- Marsilea
  - †Marsilea sprungerorum
- Martes
- †Masteutes
  - †Masteutes rupis – type locality for species
  - †Masteutes saxifer – type locality for species
- †Mataeoschistus – type locality for genus
  - †Mataeoschistus limigenus – type locality for species
- †Matthewlabis
  - †Matthewlabis cedrensis
- †Mattimys
- †Mecistoneuron – type locality for genus
  - †Mecistoneuron perpetuum – type locality for species
- Mecocephala
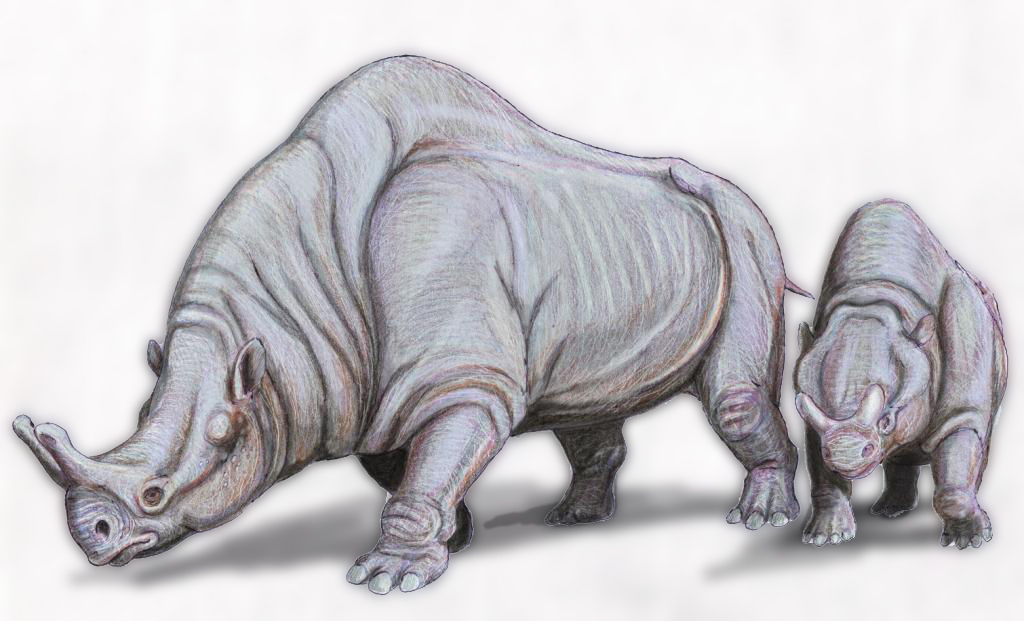
- Life restoration of the Eocene brontothere mammal Megacerops
  †Megacerops
  - †Megacerops kuwagatarhinus
- Megachile
  - †Megachile praedicta – type locality for species
- †Megacyllene
  - †Megacyllene florissantensis – type locality for species
- †Megadelphus
  - †Megadelphus lundeliusi
- †Megahippus
- †Megalagus
  - †Megalagus brachydon
  - †Megalagus brachyodon
  - †Megalagus turgidus
- †Megalesthonyx
- †Megalictis
- †Megapenthes
  - †Megapenthes primaevus – type locality for species
- †Megaraphidia – type locality for genus
  - †Megaraphidia elegans – type locality for species
  - †Megaraphidia exhumata – type locality for species
- †Megatryphon – type locality for genus
  - †Megatryphon mortiferus – type locality for species
- †Megatylopus
  - †Megatylopus gigas – or unidentified comparable form
- †Megaxyela
  - †Megaxyela petrefacta – type locality for species
- †Melanactes
  - †Melanactes cockerelli – type locality for species
- †Melanagrion
  - †Melanagrion nigerrimum – type locality for species
  - †Melanagrion umbratum – type locality for species
- †Melanagromyza
  - †Melanagromyza prisca – type locality for species
  - †Melanagromyza tephrias – type locality for species
- †Melanderella
  - †Melanderella glossalis – type locality for species
- †Melanophila
  - †Melanophila cockerellae – type locality for species
  - †Melanophila handlirschi – type locality for species
  - †Melanophila heeri – type locality for species
- Melanthrips
  - †Melanthrips extincta – type locality for species
- †Melieria
  - †Melieria atavina – type locality for species
  - †Melieria calligrapha – type locality for species
- †Melittomma
  - †Melittomma lacustrinum – type locality for species
- †Mellinus
  - †Mellinus handlirschi – type locality for species
- Melospiza
  - †Melospiza lincolnii
- †Meniscotherium
  - †Meniscotherium chamense
  - †Meniscotherium tapiacitum
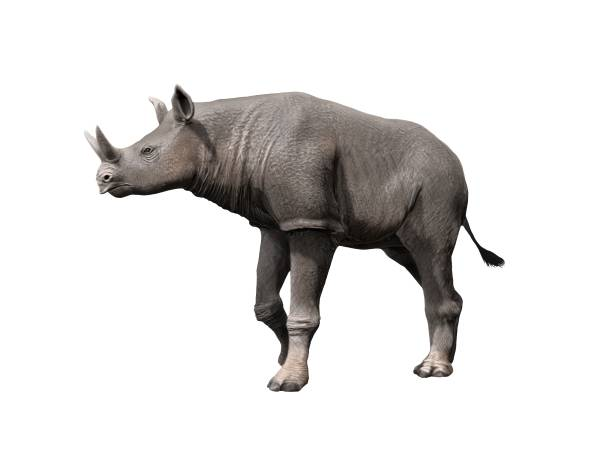
- Life restoration of the Miocene rhinoceros Menoceras
  †Menoceras
  - †Menoceras barbouri
- Mephitis
  - †Mephitis mephitis
- †Meracantha
  - †Meracantha lacustris – type locality for species
- †Merychippus
  - †Merychippus coloradense
  - †Merychippus sejunctus
- †Merychyus
  - †Merychyus arenarum
  - †Merychyus elegans – type locality for species
- †Merycochoerus
  - †Merycochoerus magnus
  - †Merycochoerus matthewi
- †Merycodus
  - †Merycodus warreni
- †Merycoidodon – type locality for genus
  - †Merycoidodon culbertsoni – type locality for species
  - †Merycoidodon major
- †Mesatirhinus
  - †Mesatirhinus junius
- †Mesobrochus – type locality for genus
  - †Mesobrochus imbecillus – type locality for species
  - †Mesobrochus lethaeus – type locality for species
- †Mesochorus
  - †Mesochorus abolitus – type locality for species
  - †Mesochorus aboriginalis – type locality for species
  - †Mesochorus carceratus – type locality for species
  - †Mesochorus cataclysmi – type locality for species
  - †Mesochorus dormitorius – type locality for species
  - †Mesochorus lapideus – type locality for species
  - †Mesochorus revocatus – type locality for species
  - †Mesochorus terrosus – type locality for species
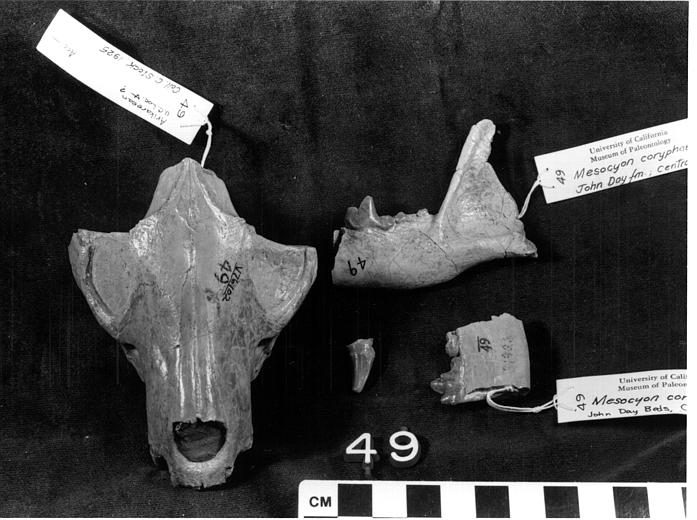
- Skull fossils of the Oligocene-Miocene dog Mesocyon
  †Mesocyon
  - †Mesocyon temnodon
- †Mesodma
  - †Mesodma ambigua
  - †Mesodma hensleighi
- †Mesogaulus
  - †Mesogaulus paniensis
- †Mesohippus
  - †Mesohippus bairdi
- †Mesoleptus
  - †Mesoleptus apertus – type locality for species
  - †Mesoleptus exstirpatus – type locality for species
- †Mesoneura
  - †Mesoneura vexabilis – type locality for species
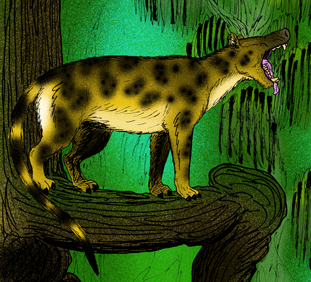
- Life restoration of the Eocene mammal Mesonyx
  †Mesonyx
  - †Mesonyx obtusidens
- †Mesopimpla – type locality for genus
  - †Mesopimpla sequoiarum – type locality for species
- †Mesostenus
  - †Mesostenus modestus – type locality for species
- Messor
  - †Messor sculpturatus – type locality for species
- †Metacheiromys
- Metachroma
  - †Metachroma florissantensis – type locality for species
- †Metarhinus
- Metasequoia
  - †Metasequoia occidentalis
- †Metechinus
  - †Metechinus amplior
- †Metoecus
  - †Metoecus geikiei – type locality for species
- †Metrobates
  - †Metrobates aeternalis – type locality for species
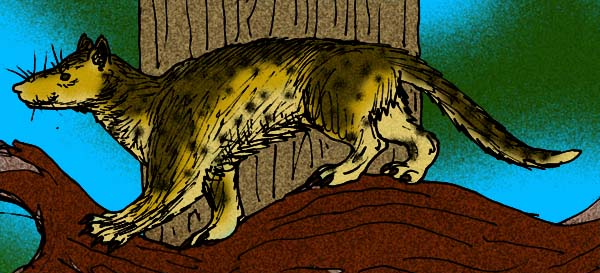
- Life restoration of the Paleocene-Eocene mammal Miacis
  †Miacis
  - †Miacis edax
  - †Miacis exiguus
  - †Miacis latidens
  - †Miacis parvivorus
  - †Miacis vorax
- Miagrammopes
- †Mianeuretus – type locality for genus
  - †Mianeuretus eocenicus – type locality for species
  - †Mianeuretus mirabilis – type locality for species
- †Michenia
- †Microgaster
  - †Microgaster primordialis – type locality for species
- †Microplitis
  - †Microplitis vesperus – type locality for species
- †Microrhagus
  - †Microrhagus fossilis – type locality for species
  - †Microrhagus miocenicus – type locality for species
  - †Microrhagus vulcanicus – type locality for species
- †Microstylum
  - †Microstylum destructum – type locality for species
  - †Microstylum wheeleri – type locality for species
- †Microsyops
  - †Microsyops angustidens
  - †Microsyops annectens
  - †Microsyops elegans
  - †Microsyops knightensis
  - †Microsyops latidens
  - †Microsyops scottianus
- †Microtomarctus
  - †Microtomarctus conferta
- Microtus
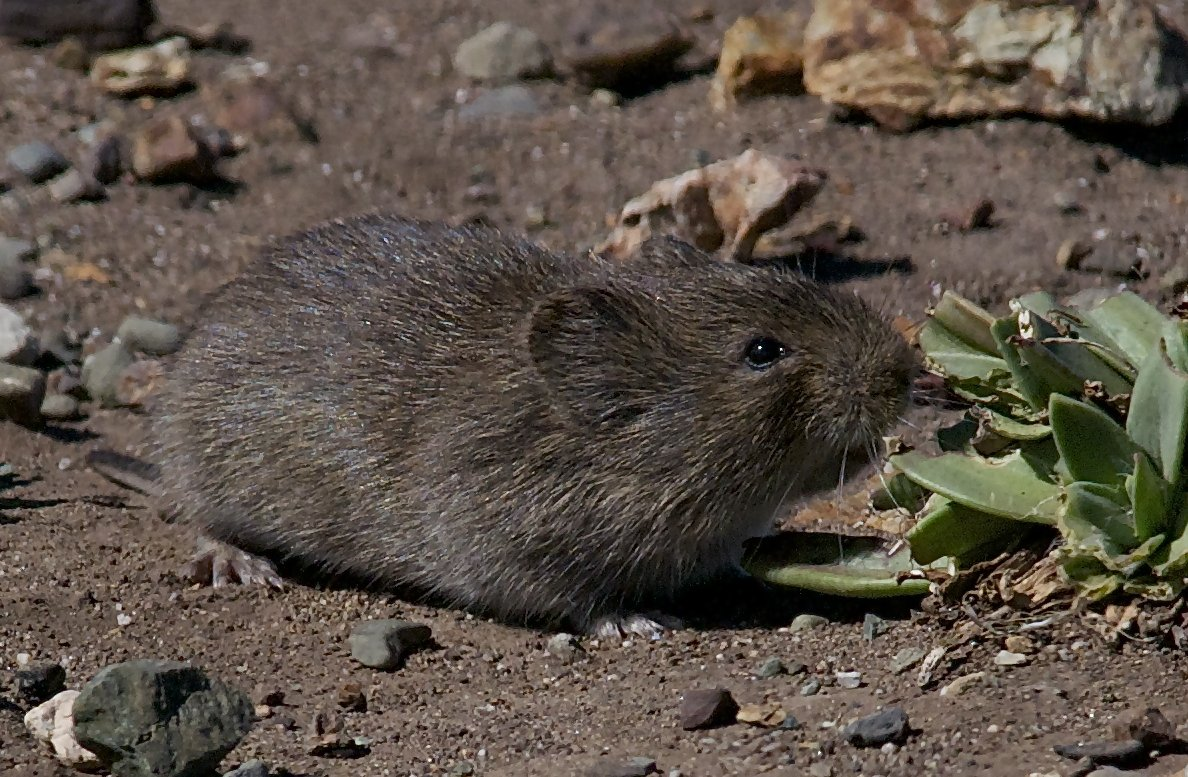
  - A living Microtus californicus, or California vole
    †Microtus californicus – or unidentified comparable form
  - †Microtus longicaudus
  - †Microtus meadensis
  - †Microtus ochrogaster
  - †Microtus paroperarius
- Mictomys
  - †Mictomys meltoni
  - †Mictomys vetus
- †Mimomys
  - †Mimomys virginianus
- †Mimoperadectes
  - †Mimoperadectes labrus
- †Mimosites
  - †Mimosites coloradensis
- †Mimotricentes
  - †Mimotricentes ischyrus – type locality for species
- †Mindarus – type locality for genus
  - †Mindarus recurvus – type locality for species
  - †Mindarus scudderi – type locality for species
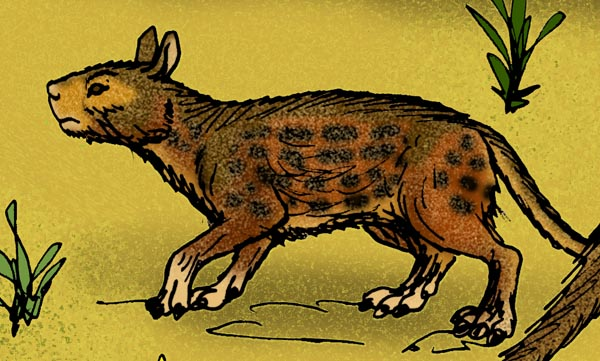
- Life restoration of the Eocene-Oligocene oreodont mammal Miniochoerus
  †Miniochoerus
  - †Miniochoerus gracilis
- †Miocaenia – type locality for genus
  - †Miocaenia pectinicornis – type locality for species
- †Miocitta – type locality for genus
  - †Miocitta galbreathi – type locality for species
- †Miocoris – type locality for genus
  - †Miocoris fagi – type locality for species
- †Miocyphon – type locality for genus
  - †Miocyphon punctulatus – type locality for species
- †Miodytiscus – type locality for genus
  - †Miodytiscus hirtipes – type locality for species
- †Miogeraeus – type locality for genus
  - †Miogeraeus recurrens – type locality for species
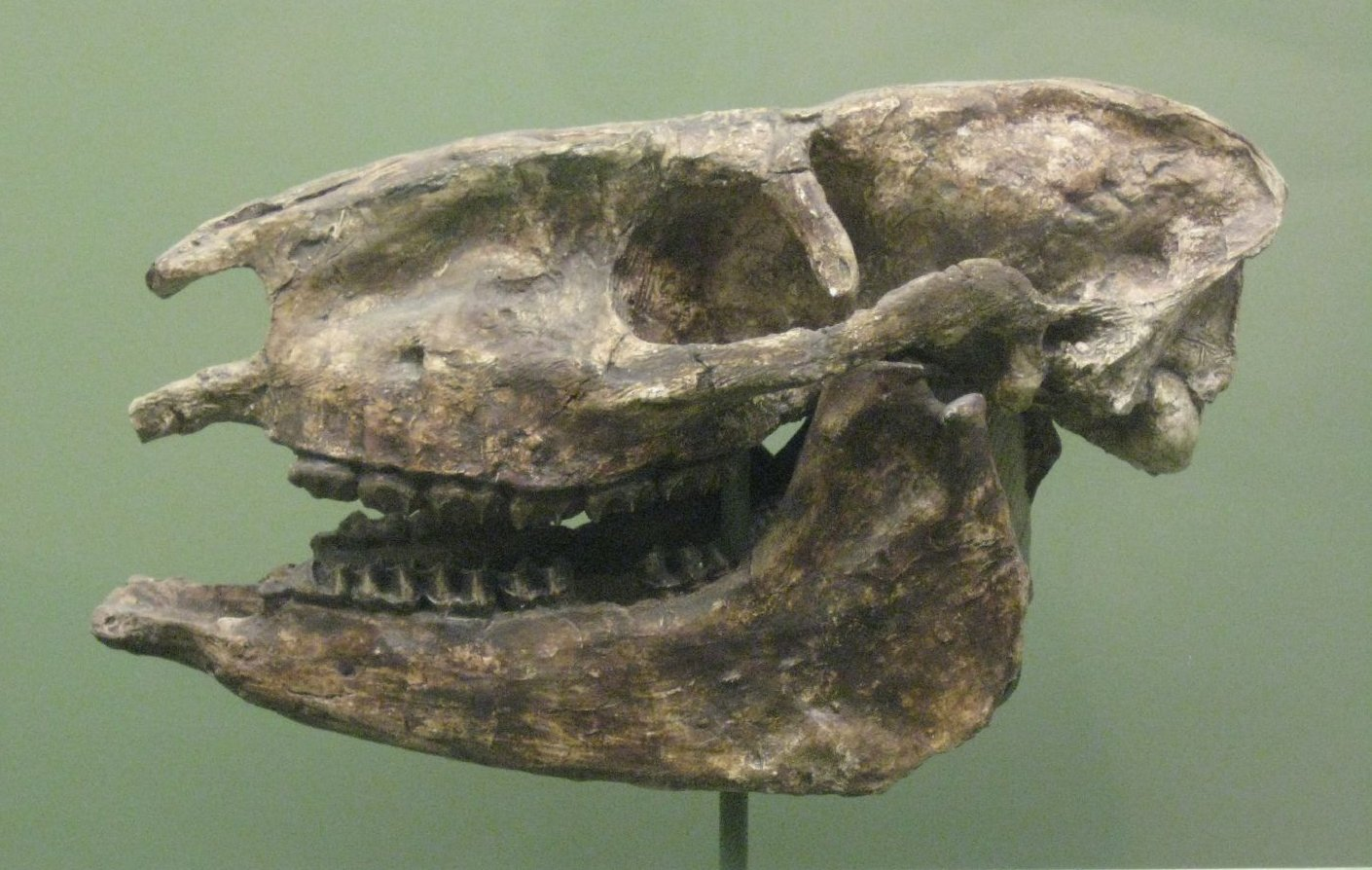
- Fossilized skull of the Eocene-Oligocene three-toed horse Miohippus
  †Miohippus
  - †Miohippus obliquidens
- †Miolabis
  - †Miolabis longiceps
- †Miolachnosterna – type locality for genus
  - †Miolachnosterna tristoides – type locality for species
- †Miolithocharis – type locality for genus
  - †Miolithocharis lithographica – type locality for species
- †Miomyrmex
  - †Miomyrmex impactus – type locality for species
  - †Miomyrmex striatus – type locality for species
- †Miophenolia – type locality for genus
  - †Miophenolia cilipes – type locality for species
- †Miopodagrion
  - †Miopodagrion optimum – type locality for species
- †Miosilpha – type locality for genus
  - †Miosilpha necrophiloides – type locality for species
- †Miospermophilus
  - †Miospermophilus bryanti
- †Miostenosis – type locality for genus
  - †Miostenosis lacordairei – type locality for species
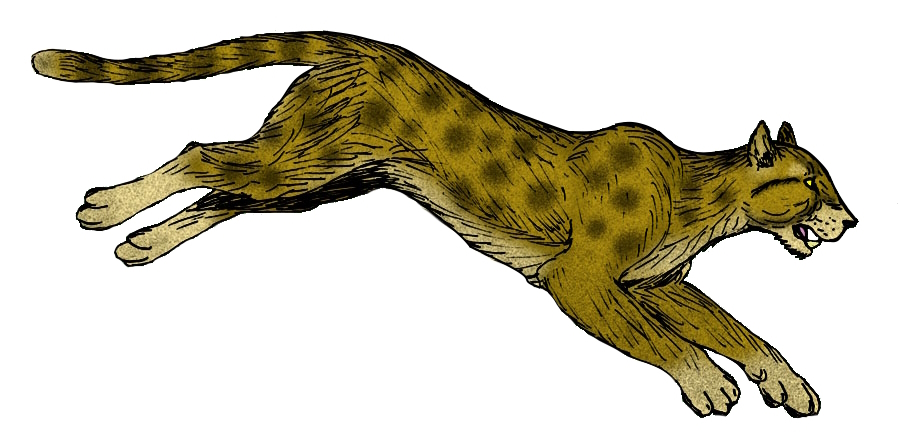
- Restoration of the Pliocene-Pleistocene Miracinonyx, or American cheetah
  †Miracinonyx
  - †Miracinonyx inexpectatus – or unidentified comparable form
  - †Miracinonyx studeri
- †Mischoserphus
  - †Mischoserphus bruesi – type locality for species
- †Mitostylus
  - †Mitostylus abacus – type locality for species
  - †Mitostylus obdurefactus – type locality for species
- †Monocrepidius
  - †Monocrepidius dubiosus – type locality for species
- †Monophlebus
  - †Monophlebus simplex – type locality for species
- †Monosaulax
  - †Monosaulax curtus
- Mordella
  - †Mordella atrata – or unidentified comparable form
  - †Mordella lapidicola – type locality for species
  - †Mordella priscula – type locality for species
  - †Mordella stygia – type locality for species
- Mordellistena
  - †Mordellistena florissantensis – type locality for species
  - †Mordellistena nearctica – type locality for species
  - †Mordellistena protogaea – type locality for species
  - †Mordellistena scudderiana – type locality for species
  - †Mordellistena smithiana – type locality for species
- †Moropus
  - †Moropus elatus – or unidentified comparable form
- Morus
  - †Morus symmetrica
- †Moyamyia – type locality for genus
  - †Moyamyia limigena – type locality for species
- Musca
  - †Musca vinculata – type locality for species
- Mustela
  - †Mustela richardsonii
  - †Mustela nigripes
- †Myas
  - †Myas rigefactus – type locality for species
  - †Myas umbrarum – type locality for species
- †Mycetaulus
  - †Mycetaulus incretus – type locality for species
- †Mycetophagus
  - †Mycetophagus exterminatus – type locality for species
  - †Mycetophagus willistoni – type locality for species
- †Mycetophila
  - †Mycetophila bradenae – type locality for species
  - †Mycetophila occultata – type locality for species
- Mycetoporus
  - †Mycetoporus demersus – type locality for species
- †Mycomya
  - †Mycomya cockerelli – type locality for species
  - †Mycomya lithomendax – type locality for species
- †Mydas
  - †Mydas miocenicus – type locality for species
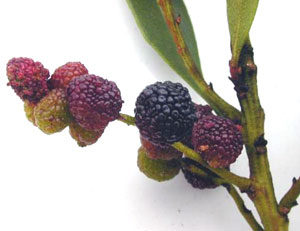
- Fruit of a living Myrica, or firetree
  Myrica
  - †Myrica drymeja
- †Myrmecites – type locality for genus
  - †Myrmecites rotundiceps – type locality for species
- Myrmica
  - †Myrmica lobifrons
- †Myrtophyllum
  - †Myrtophyllum torreyi
- †Mystipterus
  - †Mystipterus martini
- †Mytonomys
  - †Mytonomys coloradensis

== N ==
- †Najadopsis
  - †Najadopsis rugulosa
- †Nannodectes
  - †Nannodectes gazini
  - †Nannodectes gidleyi
  - †Nannodectes simpsoni
- †Nanodelphys
  - †Nanodelphys hunti
- †Nanthacia
  - †Nanthacia torpida – type locality for species
- †Navajovius
  - †Navajovius kohlhaasae – type locality for species
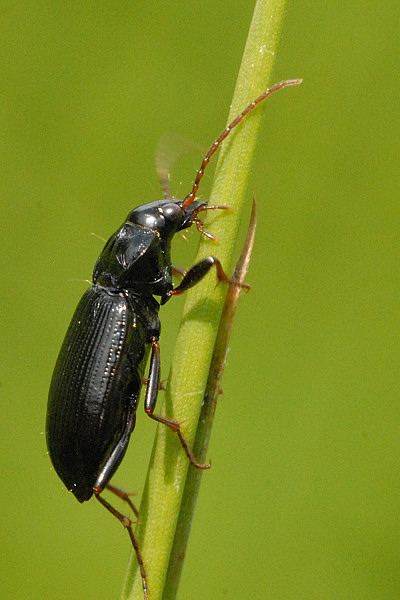
- A living Nebria ground beetle
  Nebria
  - †Nebria occlusa – type locality for species
- †Nebritus
  - †Nebritus willistoni – type locality for species
- †Necrobia
  - †Necrobia divinatoria – type locality for species
  - †Necrobia sibylla – type locality for species
- †Necrochromus – type locality for genus
  - †Necrochromus cockerelli – type locality for species
  - †Necrochromus labatus – type locality for species
  - †Necrochromus saxificus – type locality for species
- †Necrocydnus – type locality for genus
  - †Necrocydnus amyzonus – type locality for species
  - †Necrocydnus revectus – type locality for species
  - †Necrocydnus senior – type locality for species
  - †Necrocydnus solidatus – type locality for species
  - †Necrocydnus stygius – type locality for species
  - †Necrocydnus torpens – type locality for species
  - †Necrocydnus vulcanius – type locality for species
- †Necrodes
  - †Necrodes primaevus – type locality for species
- †Necropsylla – type locality for genus
  - †Necropsylla rigida – type locality for species
  - †Necropsylla rigidula – type locality for species
- †Nelumbium
  - †Nelumbium tenuifolium
- †Nemognatha
  - †Nemognatha exsecta – type locality for species
- Neohypnus
- Neogale
  - †Neogale frenata
  - †Neogale vison
- †Neoliotomus
  - †Neoliotomus conventus
  - †Neoliotomus ultimus
- Neoptochus – tentative report
- †Neorhynchocephalus
  - †Neorhynchocephalus melanderi – type locality for species
  - †Neorhynchocephalus occultator – type locality for species
  - †Neorhynchocephalus vulcanicus – type locality for species
- Neotoma
  - †Neotoma cinerea
  - †Neotoma ozarkensis
- †Nepa
  - †Nepa vulcanica – type locality for species
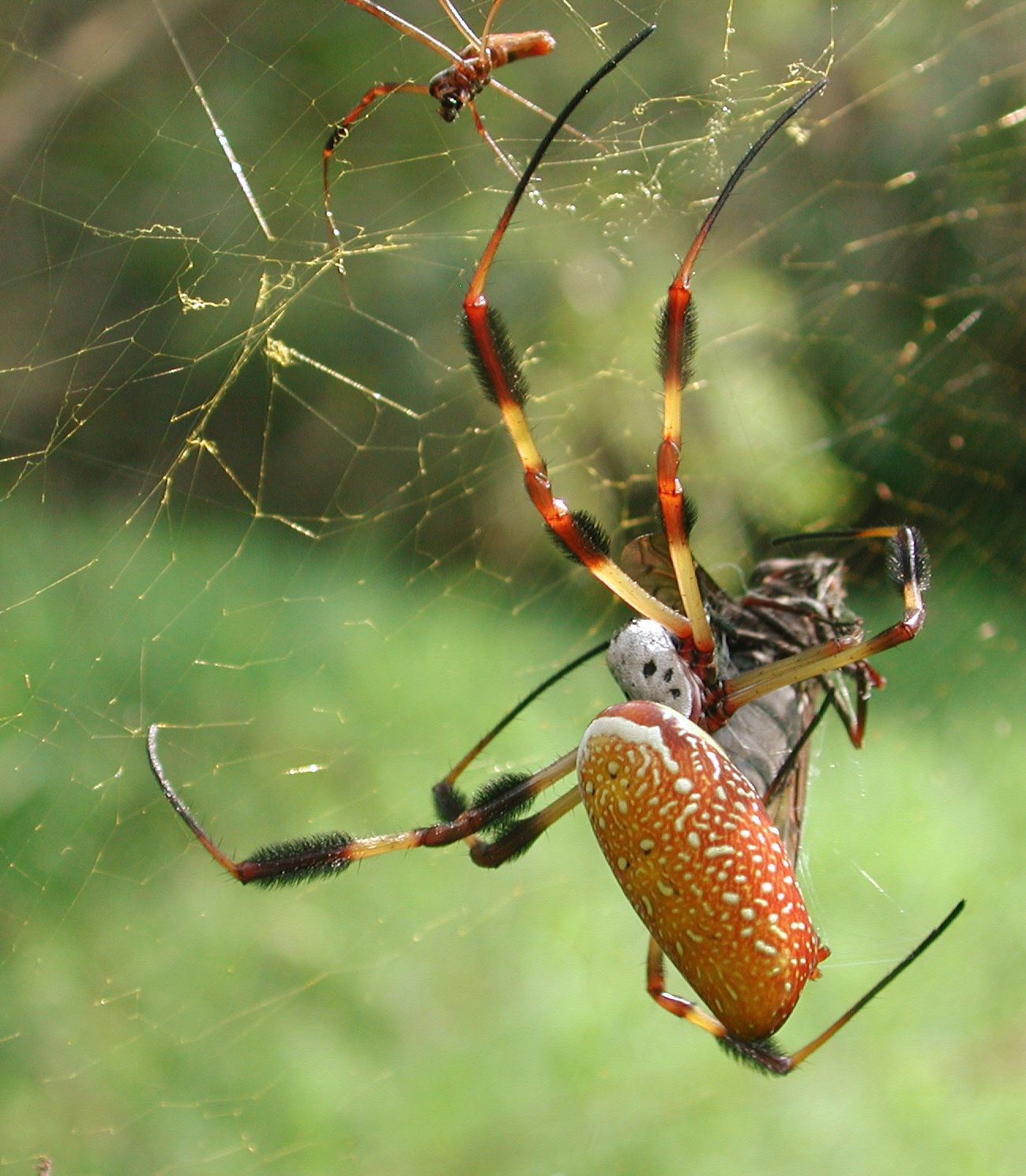
- A living Nephila, or golden silk orb-weaver
  †Nephila
  - †Nephila pennatipes – type locality for species
- †Netelia
  - †Netelia memorialis – type locality for species
- †Neurodromicus – type locality for genus
  - †Neurodromicus dorsalis – type locality for species
- †Nicocles
  - †Nicocles miocenicus – type locality for species
- †Niptomomys
  - †Niptomomys doreenae – type locality for species
- Nitidotachinus
  - †Nitidotachinus lanei
- Nitidula
  - †Nitidula prior – type locality for species
- †Nordenskioldia
  - †Nordenskioldia borealis
- †Nortonella – type locality for genus
  - †Nortonella typica – type locality for species
- †Nosotetocus – type locality for genus
  - †Nosotetocus debilis – type locality for species
  - †Nosotetocus marcovi – type locality for species
  - †Nosotetocus vespertinus – type locality for species
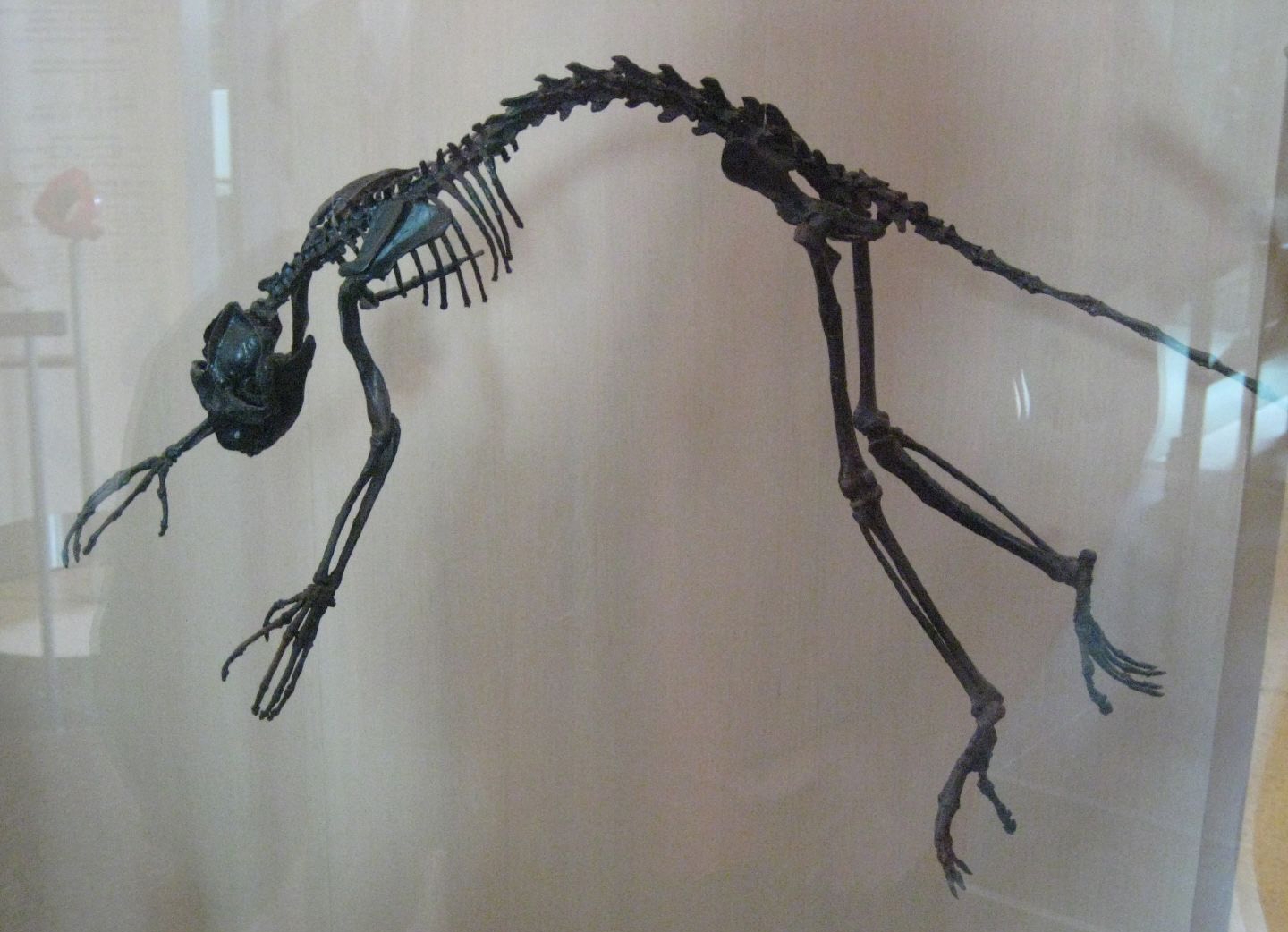
- Mounted fossilized skeleton of the Eocene primate Notharctus
  †Notharctus
  - †Notharctus robinsoni
  - †Notharctus robustior
- †Nothopus
  - †Nothopus kingii – type locality for species
- †Nothoserphus
  - †Nothoserphus rasnitsyni – type locality for species
- Notonecta
  - †Notonecta binuda – type locality for species
  - †Notonecta emersoni – type locality for species
- †Notoparamys
  - †Notoparamys arctios – type locality for species
  - †Notoparamys costilloi
- Numenius
  - †Numenius madagascariensis
- †Numitor – type locality for genus
  - †Numitor claviger – type locality for species
- †Nyctea
  - †Nyctea scandiaca
- †Nyctitherium
  - †Nyctitherium velox – or unidentified comparable form
- †Nyktalos – type locality for genus
  - †Nyktalos uhleri – type locality for species
  - †Nyktalos vigil – type locality for species
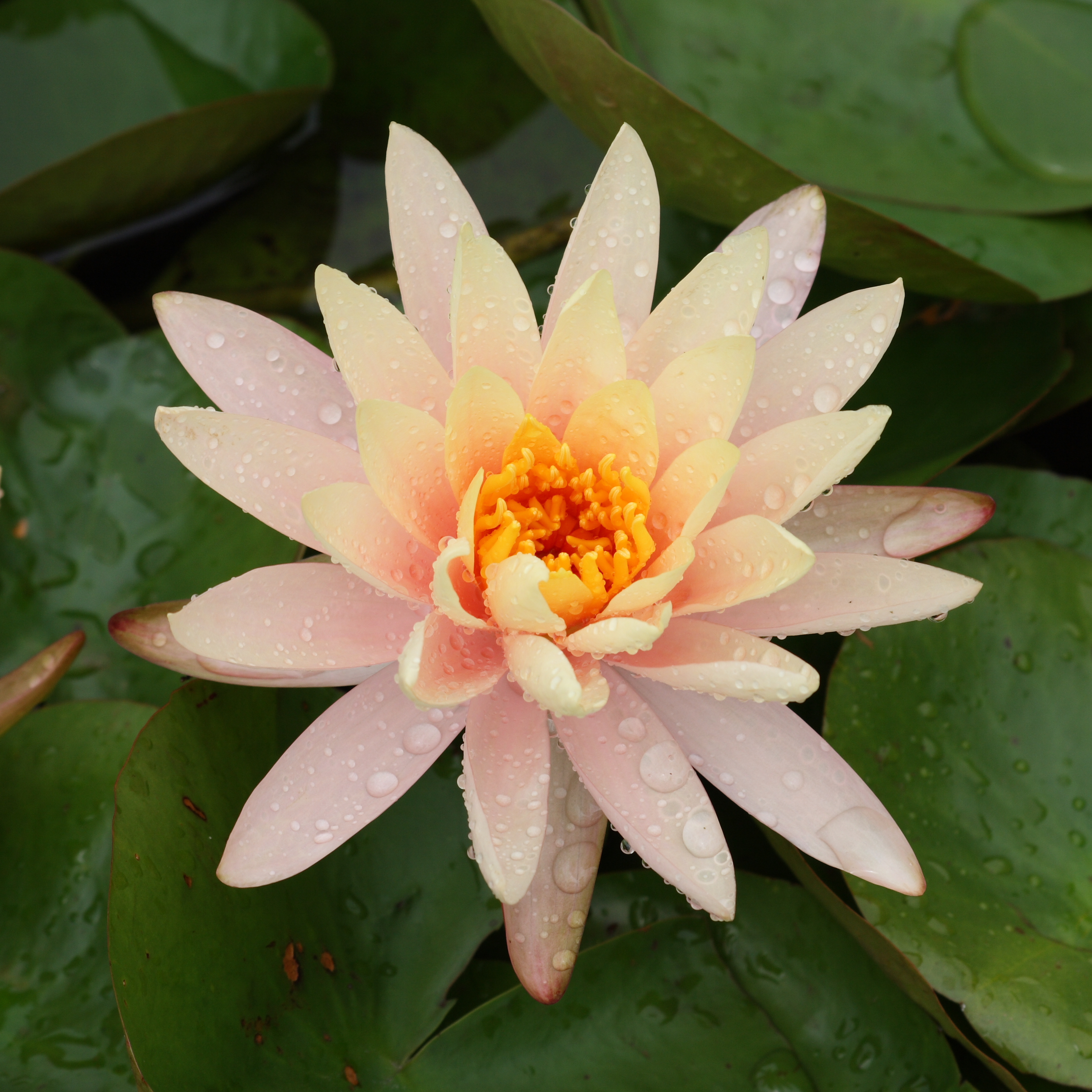
- Flower of a living Nymphaea
  Nymphaea
  - †Nymphaea leei
  - †Nymphaea pulchella
- †Nymphalites – type locality for genus
  - †Nymphalites obscurus – type locality for species
  - †Nymphalites scudderi – type locality for species
- Nysius
  - †Nysius stratus – type locality for species
  - †Nysius terrae – type locality for species
  - †Nysius tritus – type locality for species
  - †Nysius vecula – type locality for species
  - †Nysius vinctus – type locality for species
- †Nyssa
  - †Nyssa alata
  - †Nyssa obovata

== O ==
- Ochotona
  - †Ochotona princeps
- †Ocymoromelitta – type locality for genus
  - †Ocymoromelitta florissantella – type locality for species
  - †Ocymoromelitta miocenica – type locality for species
  - †Ocymoromelitta sorella – type locality for species
- †Odaxosaurus – or unidentified comparable form
  - †Odaxosaurus piger
- Odocoileus
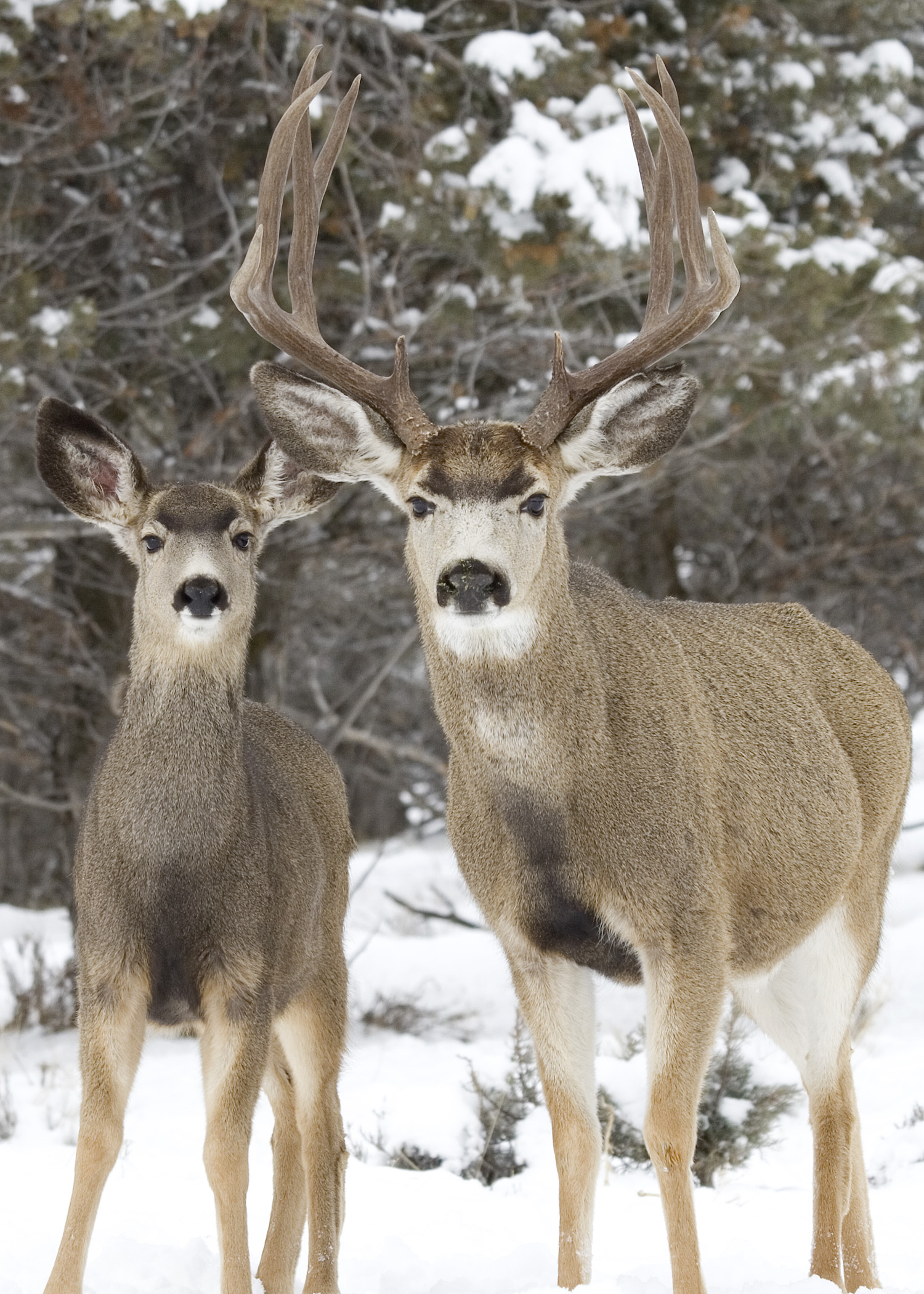
  - Living male (right) and female (left) Odocoileus hemionus, or mule deer.
    †Odocoileus hemionus
- †Odynerus
  - †Odynerus palaeophilus – type locality for species
  - †Odynerus percontusus – type locality for species
  - †Odynerus praesepultus – type locality for species
  - †Odynerus terryi – type locality for species
  - †Odynerus wilmattae – type locality for species
- †Oedipoda
  - †Oedipoda praefocata – type locality for species
- †Ogygoptynx – type locality for genus
  - †Ogygoptynx wetmorei – type locality for species
- †Olbiogaster
  - †Olbiogaster simplex – type locality for species
- †Oligaeschna
  - †Oligaeschna lapidaria – type locality for species
  - †Oligaeschna separata – type locality for species
- †Oligoaeschna – type locality for genus
  - †Oligoaeschna needhami – type locality for species
- †Oligobruchus
  - †Oligobruchus florissantensis – type locality for species
  - †Oligobruchus haywardi – type locality for species
  - †Oligobruchus primoticus – type locality for species
  - †Oligobruchus scudderi – type locality for species
  - †Oligobruchus submersus – type locality for species
  - †Oligobruchus wilsoni – type locality for species
- †Oligocryptus – type locality for genus
  - †Oligocryptus sectus – type locality for species
- †Oligodonta – type locality for genus
  - †Oligodonta florissantensis – type locality for species
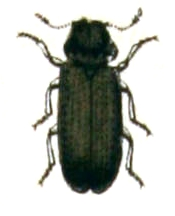
- Illustration of a living Oligomerus death-watch beetle
  †Oligomerus
  - †Oligomerus breviusculus – type locality for species
  - †Oligomerus duratus – type locality for species
  - †Oligomerus florissantensis – type locality for species
- †Oligomyotis
  - †Oligomyotis casementi
- †Oligoneuroides – type locality for genus
  - †Oligoneuroides destructus – type locality for species
- †Oligoryctes
- †Oligoscalops
  - †Oligoscalops galbreathi
- †Oligotricha
  - †Oligotricha evanescens – type locality for species
- †Ologlyptus
  - †Ologlyptus primus – type locality for species
- Olophrum
  - †Olophrum boreale
  - †Olophrum obtectum
- Omalium
  - †Omalium antiquorum – type locality for species
- †Omileus
  - †Omileus evanidus – type locality for species
- †Omomys
  - †Omomys carteri
- Omus
  - †Omus audouini
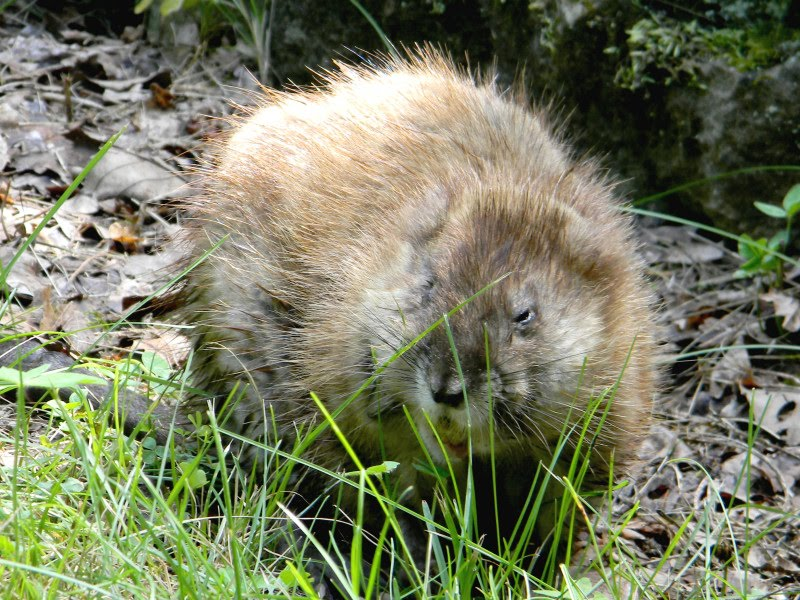
- A living Ondatra, or muskrat
  Ondatra
  - †Ondatra annectens
- †Oodectes
  - †Oodectes herpestoides
- Ophisaurus
- Ophryastes
  - †Ophryastes championi
  - †Ophryastes grandis – type locality for species
  - †Ophryastes petrarum
- †Ophryastites
  - †Ophryastites absconsus – type locality for species
  - †Ophryastites cinereus – type locality for species
  - †Ophryastites dispertitus – type locality for species
  - †Ophryastites hendersoni – type locality for species
  - †Ophryastites miocenus – type locality for species
- †Ophyra
  - †Ophyra vetusta – type locality for species
- †Opisthotriton
  - †Opisthotriton kayi – or unidentified comparable form
- †Orchelimum
  - †Orchelimum placidum – type locality for species
- Orchestes
  - †Orchestes languidulus – type locality for species
- Oreamnos – or unidentified comparable form
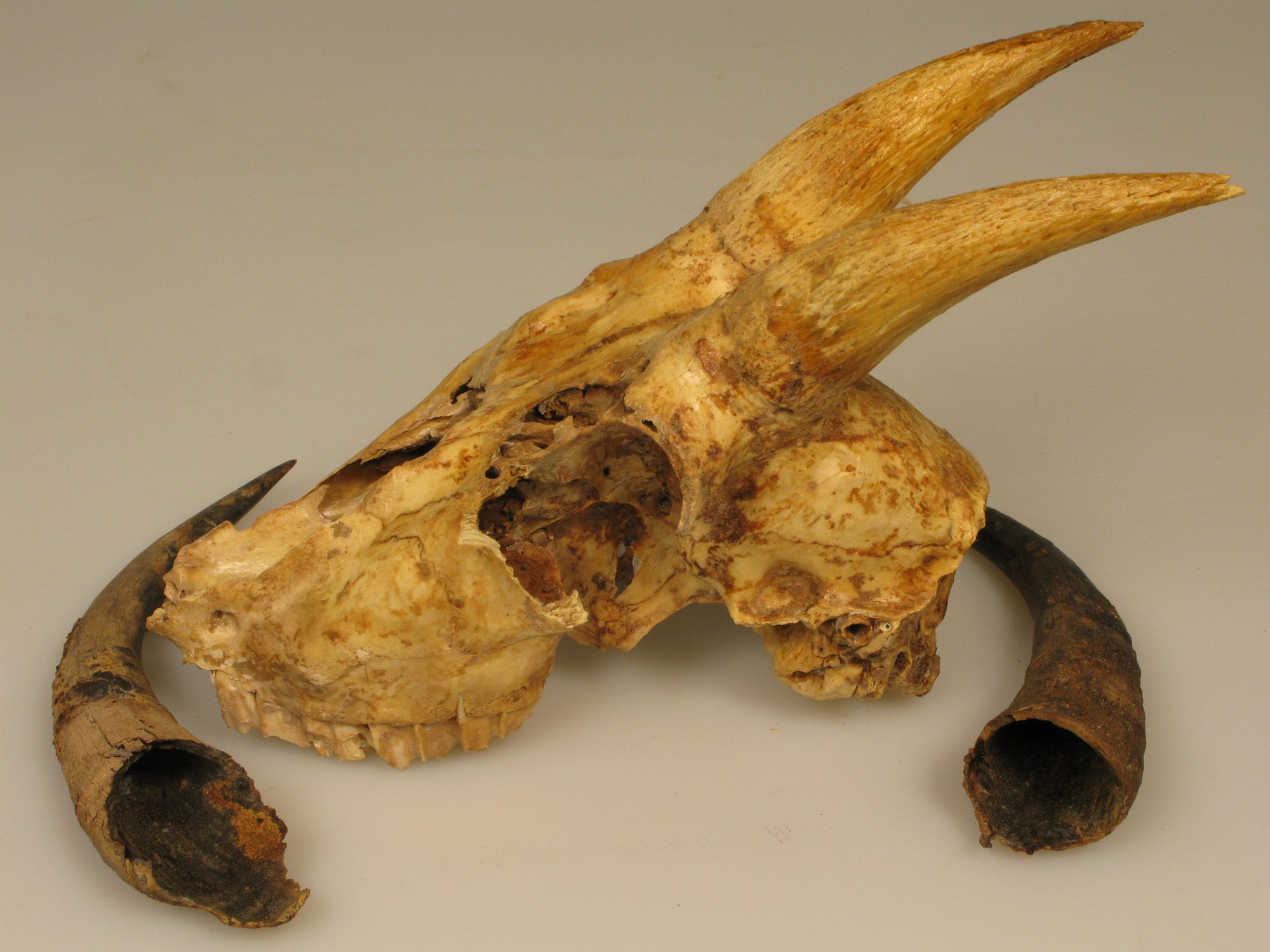
  - A living Oreamnos harringtoni, or Harrington's mountain goat
    †Oreamnos harringtoni
- †Oreolagus
  - †Oreolagus wilsoni – type locality for species
- †Oreopanax
  - †Oreopanax dissecta
  - †Oreopanax elongatum – type locality for species
- †Oreotalpa – type locality for genus
  - †Oreotalpa florissantensis – type locality for species
- †Ormyrodes
  - †Ormyrodes petrefactus – type locality for species
- †Orohippus
  - †Orohippus sylvaticus
- †Oromeryx
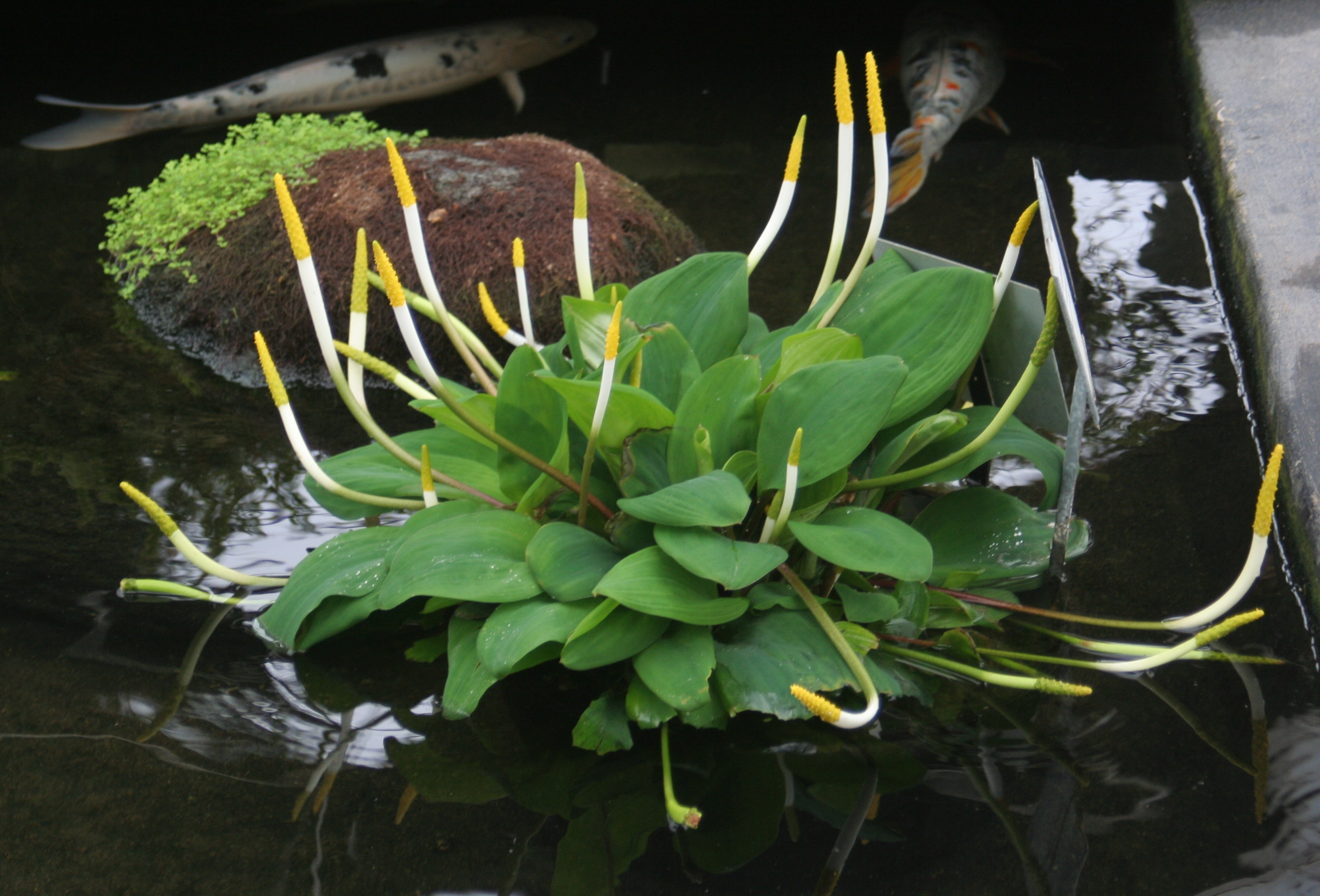
- A living Orontium, or golden-club
  †Orontium
  - †Orontium fossile
- †Orphilus
  - †Orphilus dubius
- †Orthocentrus
  - †Orthocentrus defossus – type locality for species
  - †Orthocentrus primus – type locality for species
- †Orthriocorisa – type locality for genus
  - †Orthriocorisa longipes – type locality for species
- †Oryctogma – type locality for genus
  - †Oryctogma sackenii – type locality for species
- †Oryctorhinus – type locality for genus
  - †Oryctorhinus tenuirostris – type locality for species
- †Oryctoscirtetes – type locality for genus
  - †Oryctoscirtetes protogaeum – type locality for species
- †Osmanthus
  - †Osmanthus praemissa
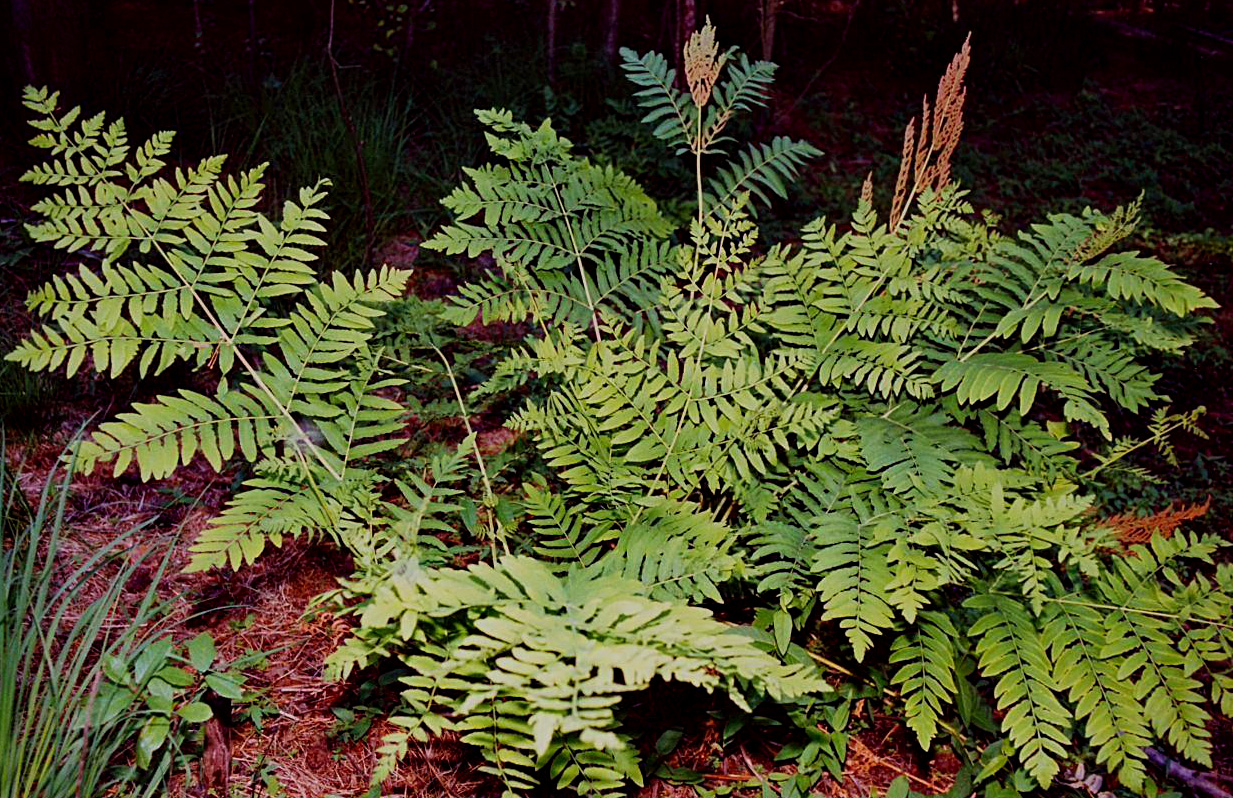
- Living Osmunda ferns
  †Osmunda
  - †Osmunda greenlandica
- †Osmylidia
  - †Osmylidia requieta – type locality for species
- †Otiorhynchites
  - †Otiorhynchites absentivus – type locality for species
  - †Otiorhynchites commutatus – type locality for species
  - †Otiorhynchites florissantensis – type locality for species
  - †Otiorhynchites tysoni
- †Otiorhynchus
  - †Otiorhynchus flaccus – type locality for species
  - †Otiorhynchus subteractus – type locality for species
- Ovis
  - †Ovis canadensis
- †Oxyacodon
  - †Oxyacodon archibaldi – type locality for species
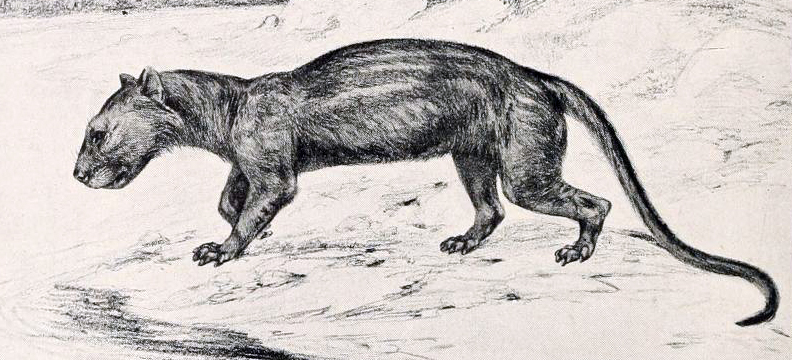
- Life restoration of the Paleocene-Eocene creodont mammal Oxyaena
  †Oxyaena
  - †Oxyaena forcipata
  - †Oxyaena gulo
  - †Oxyaena intermedia
  - †Oxyaena lupina – or unidentified comparable form
  - †Oxyaena pardalis – or unidentified comparable form
- †Oxycera
  - †Oxycera contusa – type locality for species
- †Oxyclaenus
  - †Oxyclaenus cuspidatus – or unidentified comparable form
  - †Oxyclaenus subbituminus – type locality for species
- †Oxygonus
  - †Oxygonus primus – type locality for species
- †Oxyomus
  - †Oxyomus nearcticus – type locality for species
- †Oxyprimus
  - †Oxyprimus galadrielae – or unidentified comparable form
- †Oxyserphus
  - †Oxyserphus exhumatus – type locality for species
- Oxytelus
  - †Oxytelus laqueatus
  - †Oxytelus pristinus – type locality for species
  - †Oxytelus subapterus – type locality for species

== P ==
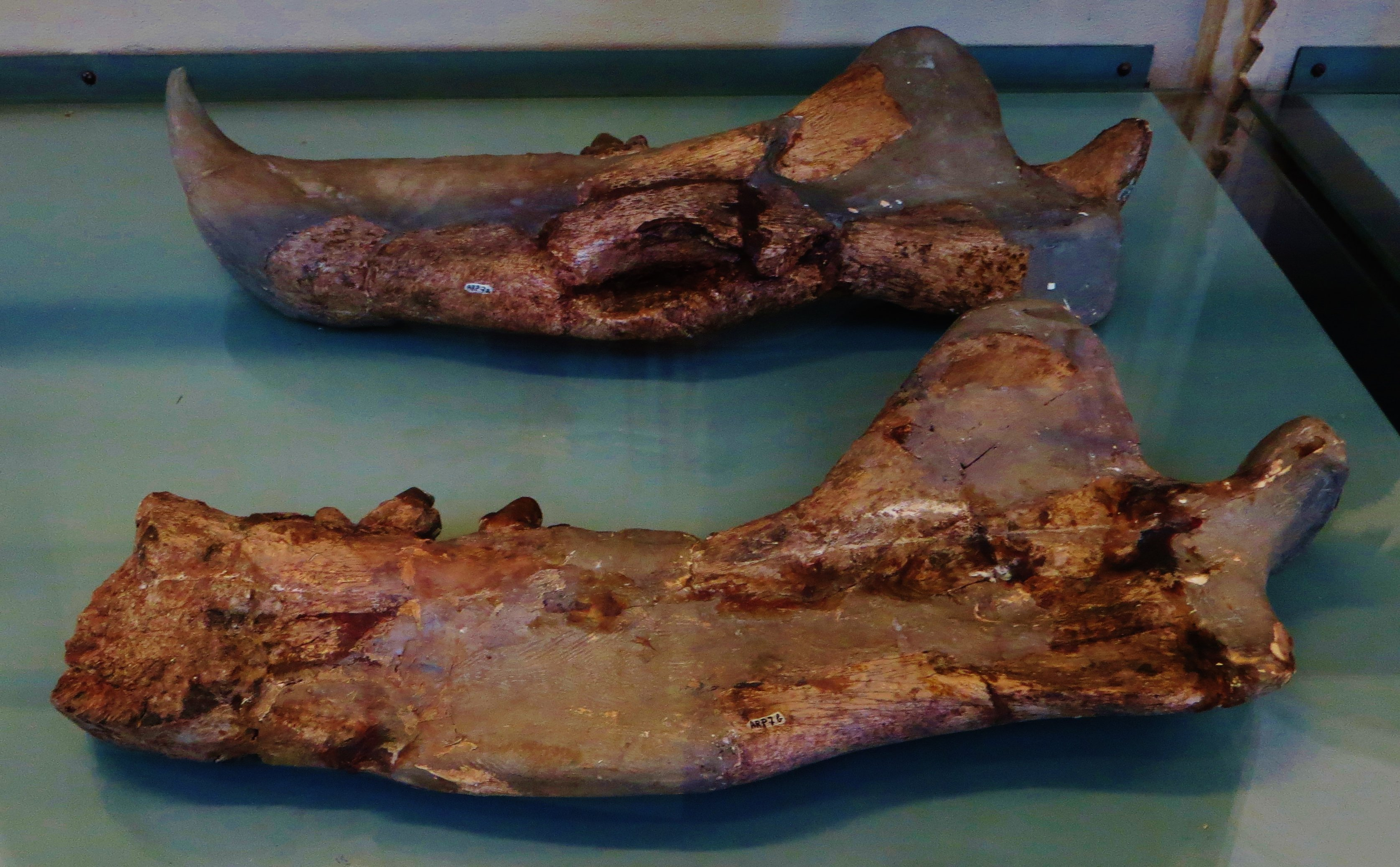
- Fossilized mandibles of the Paleocene-Eocene mesonychian mammal Pachyaena
  †Pachyaena
  - †Pachyaena ossifraga – tentative report
- †Pachybaris
  - †Pachybaris rudis – type locality for species
- †Pachylobius
  - †Pachylobius compressus
  - †Pachylobius depraedatus – type locality for species
- †Pachysomites – type locality for genus
  - †Pachysomites inermis – type locality for species
- †Pachysystropus – type locality for genus
  - †Pachysystropus condemnatus – type locality for species
  - †Pachysystropus rohweri – type locality for species
- †Pactopus
  - †Pactopus americanus – type locality for species
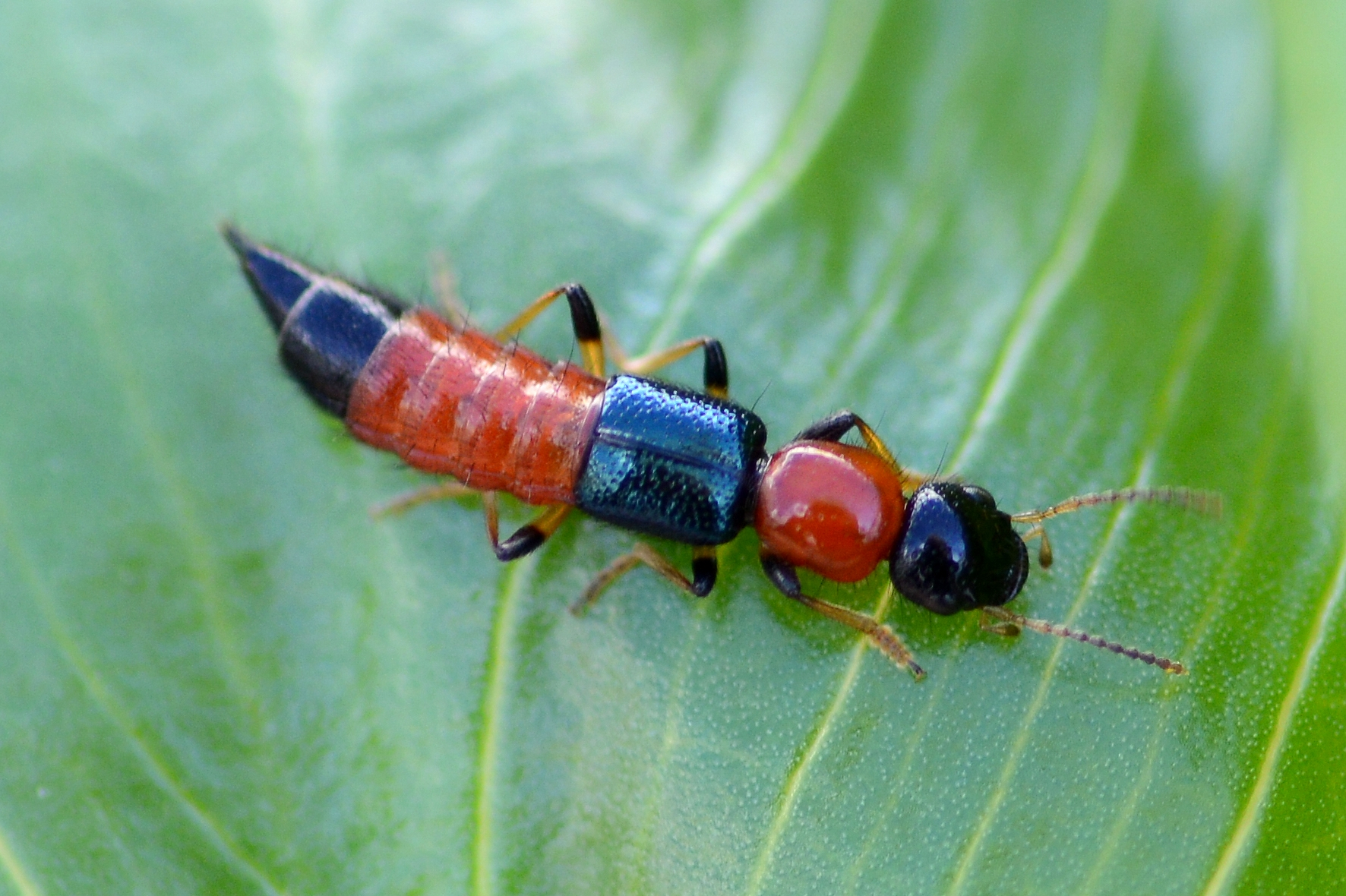
- A living Paederus rove beetle
  †Paederus
  - †Paederus adumbratus – type locality for species
- †Paladicella – type locality for genus
  - †Paladicella eruptionis – type locality for species
- †Palaeictops
  - †Palaeictops bicuspis
  - †Palaeictops multicuspis
- †Palaeobittacus – type locality for genus
  - †Palaeobittacus eocenicus – type locality for species
- †Palaeochrysa – type locality for genus
  - †Palaeochrysa concinnula – type locality for species
  - †Palaeochrysa stricta – type locality for species
  - †Palaeochrysa wickhami – type locality for species
- †Palaeocrex – type locality for genus
  - †Palaeocrex fax – type locality for species
- †Palaeodrassus
  - †Palaeodrassus cockerelli – type locality for species
  - †Palaeodrassus florissanti – type locality for species
  - †Palaeodrassus hesternus
  - †Palaeodrassus interitus – type locality for species
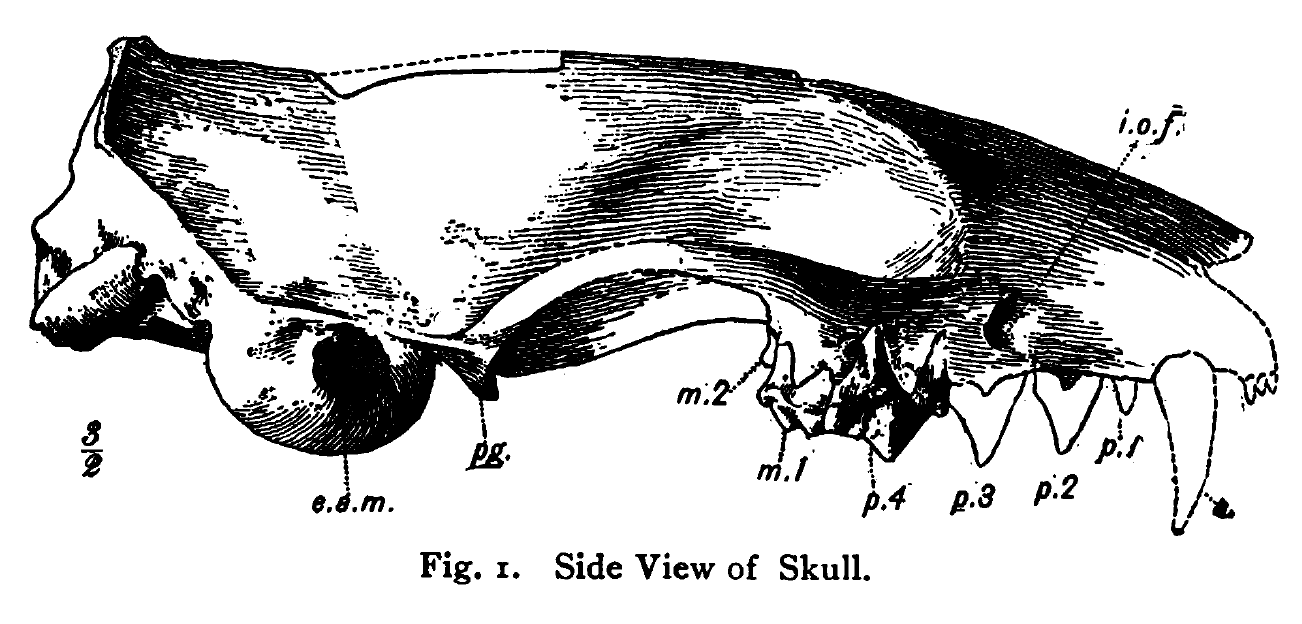
- Illustration of a fossilized cranium of the Eocene-Miocene carnivoran mammal Palaeogale
  †Palaeogale
  - †Palaeogale sectoria
- †Palaeogyps – type locality for genus
  - †Palaeogyps prodromus – type locality for species
- †Palaeolagus
  - †Palaeolagus burkei – type locality for species
  - †Palaeolagus haydeni
  - †Palaeolagus intermedius
- †Palaeometa
  - †Palaeometa opertanea – type locality for species
- †Palaeonanophyes – type locality for genus
  - †Palaeonanophyes zherikhini – type locality for species
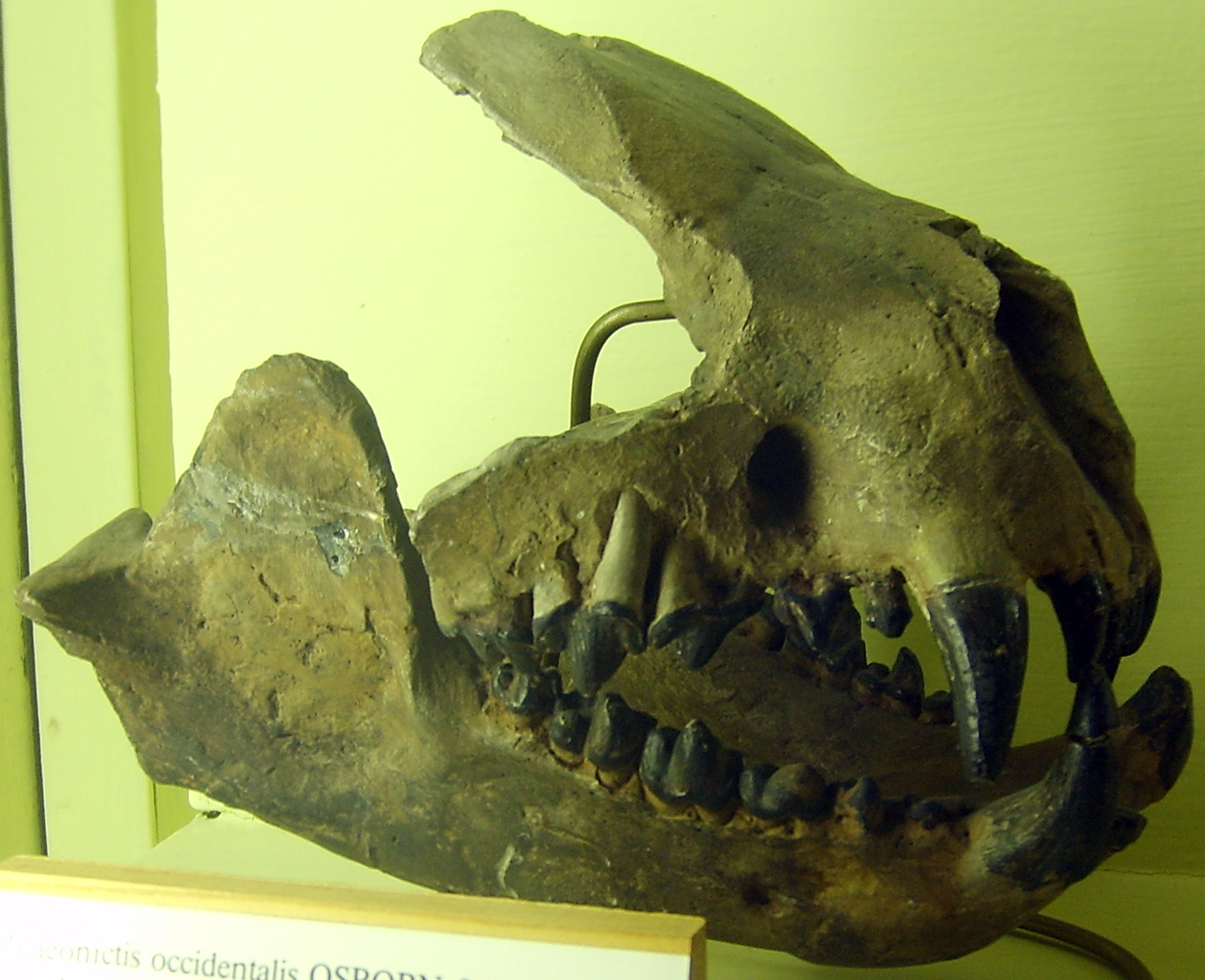
- Fossilized partial skull of the Paleocene-Eocene creodont mammal Palaeonictis
  †Palaeonictis
  - †Palaeonictis occidentalis
- †Palaeopachygnatha – type locality for genus
  - †Palaeopachygnatha cockerelli – type locality for species
  - †Palaeopachygnatha scudderi – type locality for species
- †Palaeopherocera
  - †Palaeopherocera scudderi – type locality for species
- †Palaeoplatyura
  - †Palaeoplatyura eocenica – type locality for species
- †Palaeopotamogeton
  - †Palaeopotamogeton florissanti
- †Palaeorehnia – type locality for genus
  - †Palaeorehnia maculata – type locality for species
- †Palaeoscincosaurus – type locality for genus
  - †Palaeoscincosaurus middletoni – type locality for species
- †Palaeosinopa
  - †Palaeosinopa incerta
- †Palaeosmodicum – type locality for genus
  - †Palaeosmodicum hamiltoni – type locality for species
- †Palaeospiza
  - †Palaeospiza bella
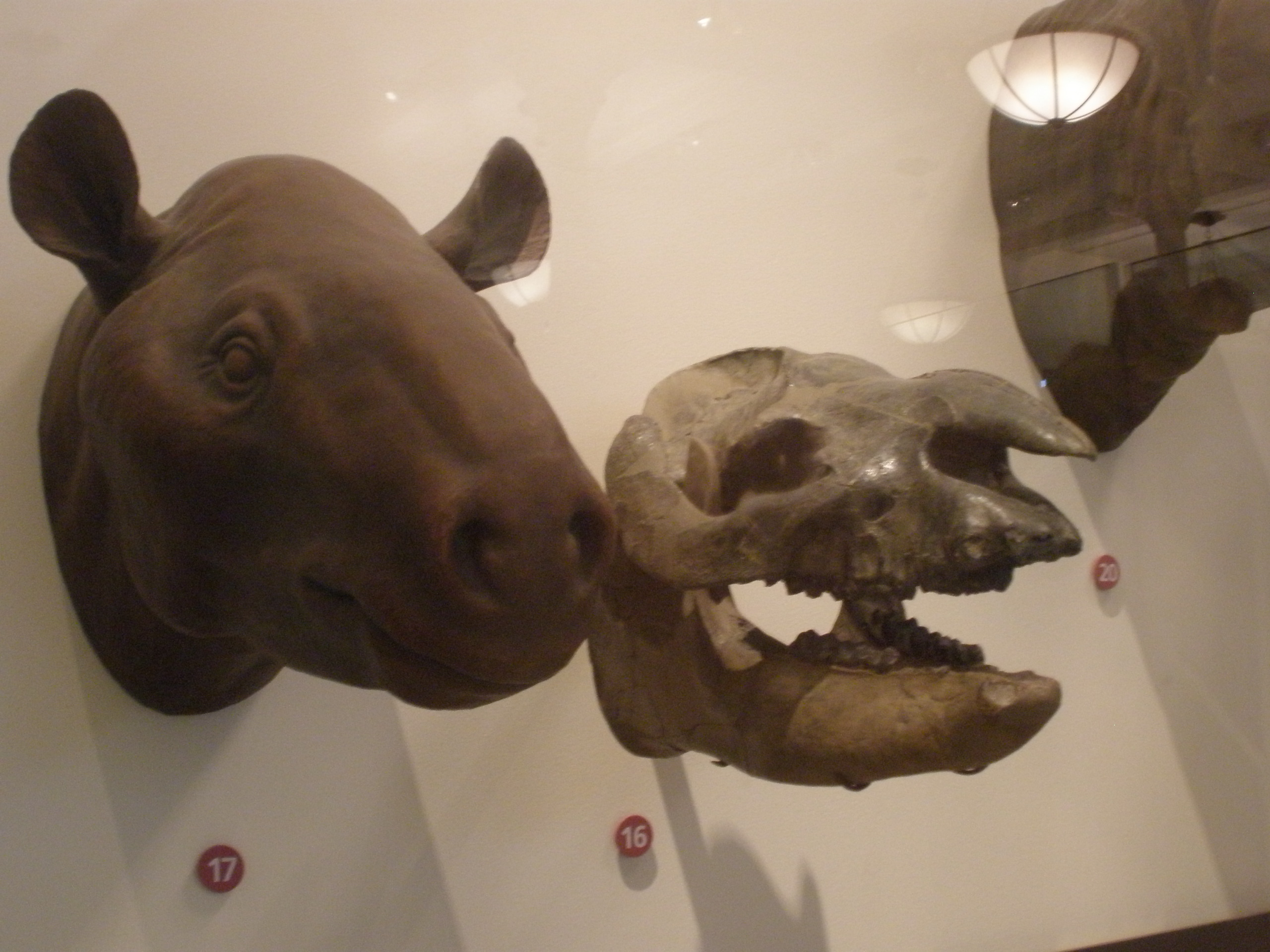
- Restorative model and fossilized skull of the Eocene brontothere mammal Palaeosyops
  †Palaeosyops – type locality for genus
  - †Palaeosyops fontinalis – type locality for species
- †Palaeotaxonus – type locality for genus
  - †Palaeotaxonus trivittatus – type locality for species
  - †Palaeotaxonus typicus – type locality for species
  - †Palaeotaxonus vetus – type locality for species
- †Palaeoteleia – type locality for genus
  - †Palaeoteleia oxyura – type locality for species
- †Palaeotorymus
  - †Palaeotorymus aciculatus – type locality for species
  - †Palaeotorymus laevis – type locality for species
  - †Palaeotorymus striatus – type locality for species
  - †Palaeotorymus typicus – type locality for species
- †Palaeovelia – type locality for genus
  - †Palaeovelia spinosa – type locality for species
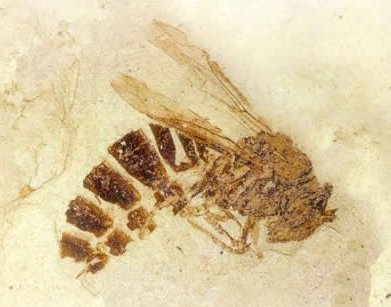
- Fossil of the Eocene wasp Palaeovespa
  †Palaeovespa – type locality for genus
  - †Palaeovespa florissantia – type locality for species
  - †Palaeovespa gillettei – type locality for species
  - †Palaeovespa relecta – type locality for species
  - †Palaeovespa scudderi – type locality for species
  - †Palaeovespa wilsoni – type locality for species
- †Palaphrodes – type locality for genus
  - †Palaphrodes cincta – type locality for species
  - †Palaphrodes irregularis – type locality for species
  - †Palaphrodes obliqua – type locality for species
  - †Palaphrodes obscura – type locality for species
  - †Palaphrodes transversa – type locality for species
- †Palatobaena
  - †Palatobaena bairdi
- †Palecphora – type locality for genus
  - †Palecphora communis – type locality for species
  - †Palecphora inornata – type locality for species
  - †Palecphora maculata – type locality for species
  - †Palecphora marvinei – type locality for species
  - †Palecphora praevalens – type locality for species
- †Paleocarcinophora
  - †Paleocarcinophora lithophila – type locality for species
- †Paleoclinolabus
  - †Paleoclinolabus dormitus – type locality for species
- †Palmites
- †Palmocarpon
  - †Palmocarpon commune
  - †Palmocarpon compositum
  - †Palmocarpon lineatum
  - †Palmocarpon subcylindricum
  - †Palmocarpon truncatum
- †Paloedemera – type locality for genus
  - †Paloedemera crassipes – type locality for species
- †Paloreodoxites
  - †Paloreodoxites plicatus
- †Paltorhynchus
  - †Paltorhynchus bisulcatus – type locality for species
  - †Paltorhynchus depratus
  - †Paltorhynchus narwhal
  - †Paltorhynchus rectirostris – type locality for species
  - †Paltorhynchus sedatus – type locality for species
- †Panax
  - †Panax andrewsii
- †Pandeleteinus
  - †Pandeleteinus nudus – type locality for species
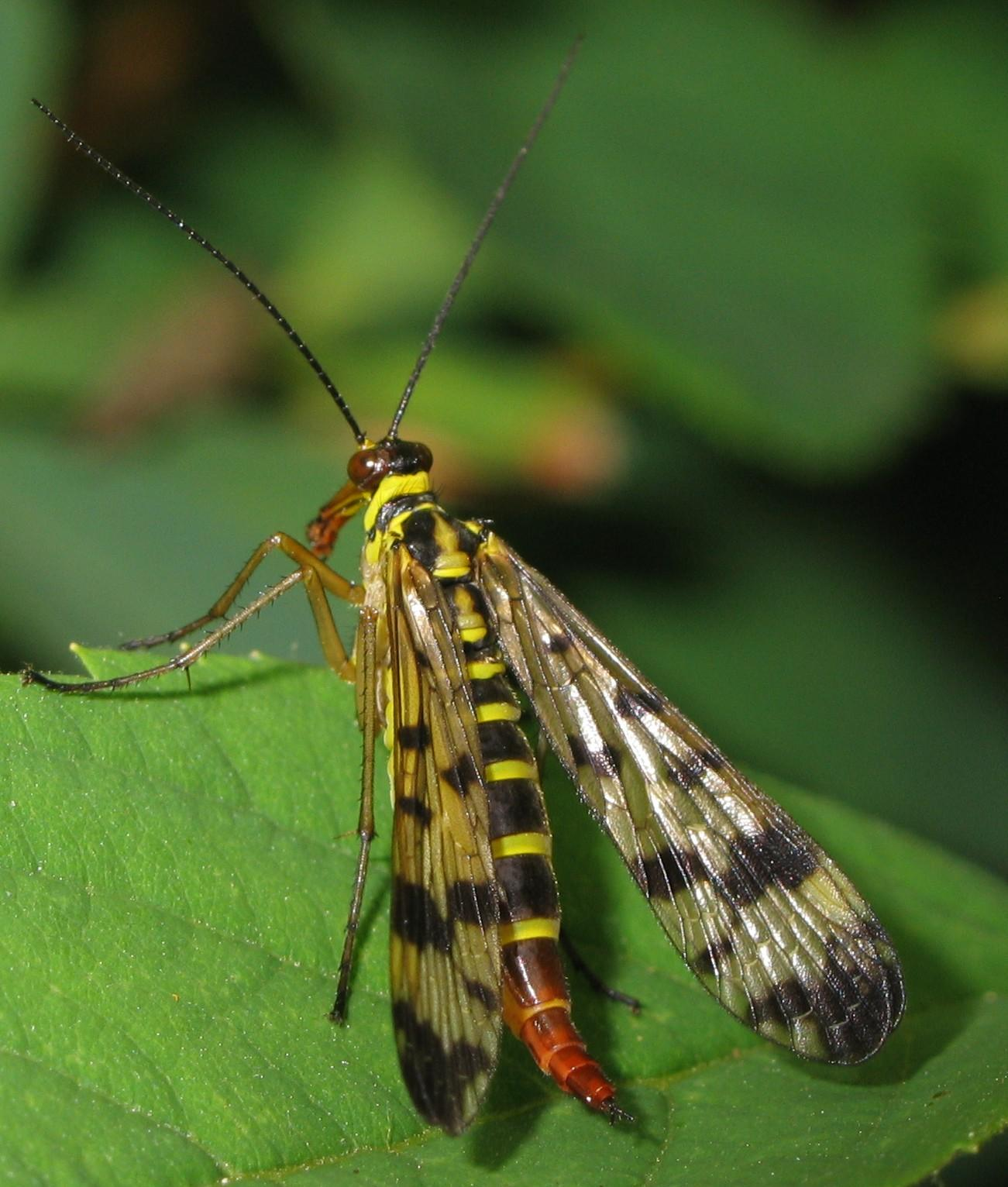
- A living Panorpa scorpionfly
  †Panorpa
  - †Panorpa arctiiformis – type locality for species
  - †Panorpa rigida – type locality for species
- †Pantoclis
  - †Pantoclis deperdita – type locality for species
- †Pantolestes
  - †Pantolestes natans
- †Paracarpinus
  - †Paracarpinus fraterna
- Paracosmus – type locality for genus
  - †Paracosmus antiquus – type locality for species
  - †Paracosmus coquilletti – type locality for species
  - †Paracosmus palpalis – type locality for species
  - †Paracosmus recurrens – type locality for species
- †Paracosoryx
- †Paracynarctus
  - †Paracynarctus kelloggi
- †Paradjidaumo
  - †Paradjidaumo trilophus
- †Paraglyptosaurus
  - †Paraglyptosaurus princeps – type locality for species
- †Parahippus
  - †Parahippus leonensis – or unidentified comparable form
  - †Parahippus pawniensis – type locality for species
- †Parajulus
  - †Parajulus cockerelli – type locality for species
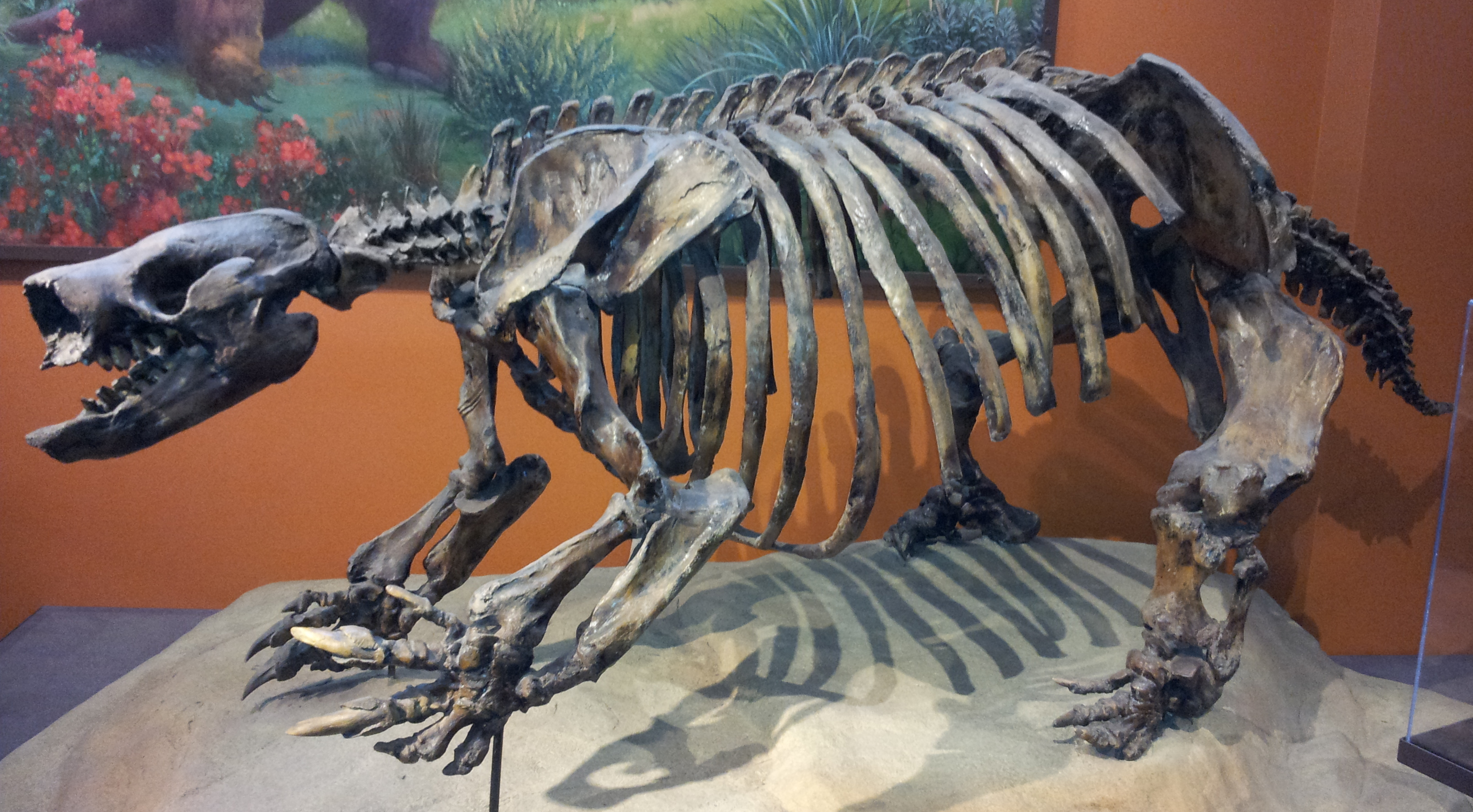
- Fossilized skeleton of the Pliocene-Pleistocene ground sloth Paramylodon
  †Paramylodon
  - †Paramylodon harlani
- †Paramys
  - †Paramys copei
  - †Paramys excavatus
  - †Paramys relictus
  - †Paramys taurus
- †Parandra
  - †Parandra florissantensis – type locality for species
- †Parattus – type locality for genus
  - †Parattus evocatus – type locality for species
  - †Parattus latitatus – type locality for species
  - †Parattus oculatus – type locality for species
  - †Parattus resurrectus – type locality for species
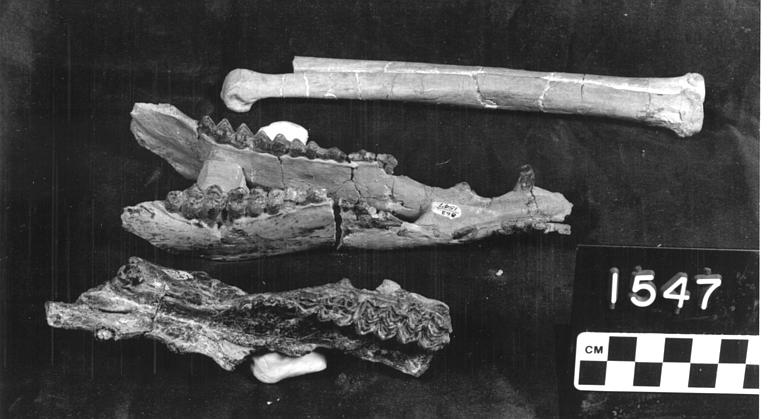
- Fossilized partial skull and limb bone of the Eocene-Oligocene camel Paratylopus
  †Paratylopus
  - †Paratylopus labiatus
- †Parectypodus
  - †Parectypodus lunatus
- †Parictis
  - †Parictis dakotensis
- †Parodarmistus – type locality for genus
  - †Parodarmistus abscissus – type locality for species
  - †Parodarmistus caducus – type locality for species
  - †Parodarmistus collisus – type locality for species
  - †Parodarmistus defectus – type locality for species
  - †Parodarmistus exanimatus – type locality for species
  - †Parodarmistus inhibitus – type locality for species
- †Parolamia – type locality for genus
  - †Parolamia rudis – type locality for species
- †Parophisaurus – type locality for genus
  - †Parophisaurus pawneensis – type locality for species
- †Parotermes – type locality for genus
  - †Parotermes insignis – type locality for species
- †Parthenocissus
  - †Parthenocissus osbornii
- †Parvericius
  - †Parvericius montanus
- †Passaloecus
  - †Passaloecus fasciatus – type locality for species
  - †Passaloecus scudderi – type locality for species
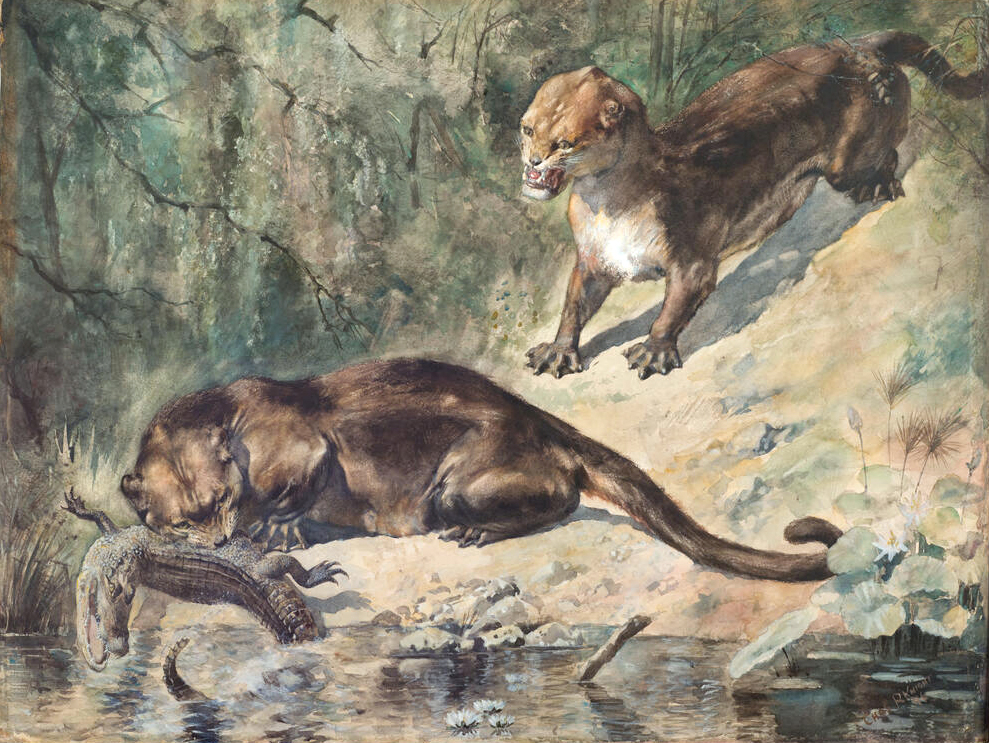
- Life restoration of the Eocene creodont mammal Patriofelis. Charles R. Knight (1896).
  †Patriofelis
  - †Patriofelis ulta
- †Paussopsis – type locality for genus
  - †Paussopsis nearctica – type locality for species
  - †Paussopsis secunda – type locality for species
- Pediacus
  - †Pediacus periclitans – type locality for species
- Pekania
  - †Pekania diluviana
- †Pelandrena – type locality for genus
  - †Pelandrena reducta – type locality for species
- †Pellea
  - †Pellea antiquella
- †Peltis
  - †Peltis laminata – type locality for species
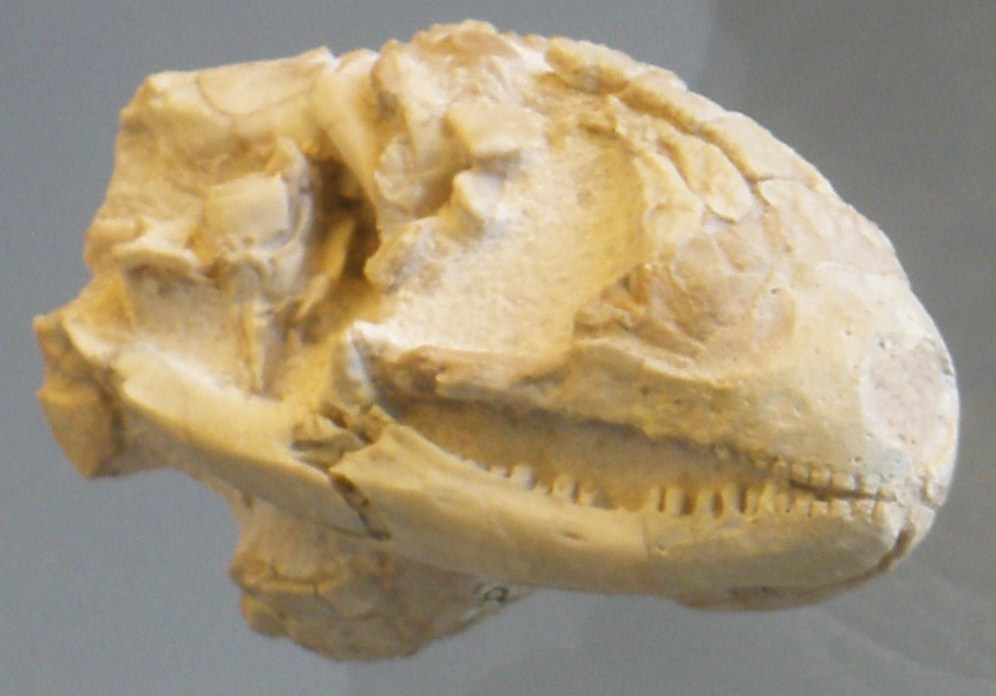
- Fossilized skull of the Eocene-Oligocene lizard Peltosaurus
  †Peltosaurus
  - †Peltosaurus granulosus – type locality for species
- †Pelycodus
  - †Pelycodus danielsae
  - †Pelycodus jarrovii
- †Pelycomys
  - †Pelycomys placidus
  - †Pelycomys rugosus
- †Penetrigonias
  - †Penetrigonias dakotensis
- †Penosphyllum
  - †Penosphyllum cordatum
- †Pentatomites – type locality for genus
  - †Pentatomites foliarum – type locality for species
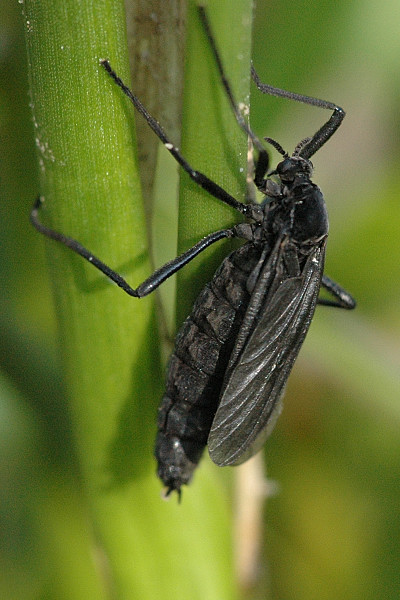
- A living Penthetria march fly
  Penthetria – type locality for genus
  - †Penthetria creedensis – type locality for species
  - †Penthetria immutabilis – type locality for species
  - †Penthetria intermedia – type locality for species
  - †Penthetria longifurca – type locality for species
- †Pepsis
  - †Pepsis avitula – type locality for species
- †Peraceras
  - †Peraceras profectum
  - †Peraceras superciliosum
- †Peradectes
  - †Peradectes elegans – type locality for species
  - †Peradectes protinnominatus – type locality for species
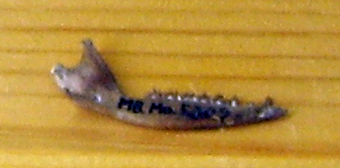
- Fossilized mandible of the Eocene-Miocene mammal Peratherium
  †Peratherium
  - †Peratherium comstocki – or unidentified comparable form
- †Perchoerus
  - †Perchoerus nanus
- †Periptychus
  - †Periptychus coarctatus
- Peromyscus
  - †Peromyscus cragini
  - †Peromyscus maniculatus
  - †Peromyscus progressus
- Persea
  - †Persea brossiana
  - †Persea florissantia – type locality for species
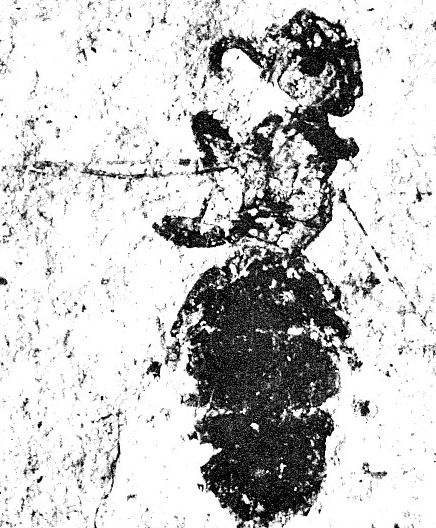
- Fossil of the Oligocene ant Petraeomyrmex
  †Petraeomyrmex – type locality for genus
  - †Petraeomyrmex minimus – type locality for species
- †Petrolabis
  - †Petrolabis gurneyi – type locality for species
- †Petrolestes – type locality for genus
  - †Petrolestes hendersoni – type locality for species
- †Petrolystra – type locality for genus
  - †Petrolystra gigantea – type locality for species
  - †Petrolystra heros – type locality for species
- †Petrunkevitchiana
  - †Petrunkevitchiana oculata – type locality for species
- †Phaca
  - †Phaca wilmattae
- Phalacrocorax
  - †Phalacrocorax mediterraneus
- Phalaropus
  - †Phalaropus lobatus
- †Phaseolites
  - †Phaseolites dedal – type locality for species
- †Phasmagyps – type locality for genus
  - †Phasmagyps patritus – type locality for species
- Pheidole
  - †Pheidole tertiaria – type locality for species
- †Phenacodaptes
  - †Phenacodaptes sabulosus
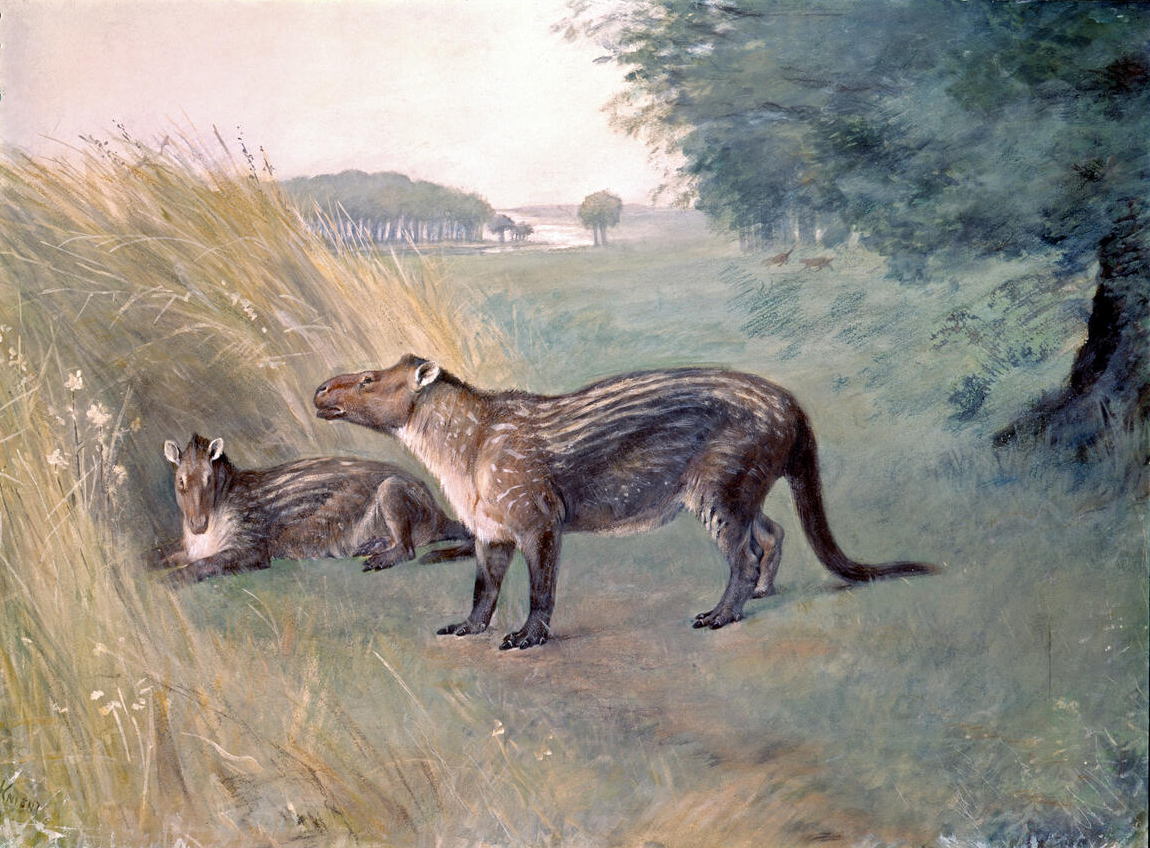
- Life restoration of the Paleocene-Eocene ungulate Phenacodus. Charles R. Knight (1898).
  †Phenacodus
  - †Phenacodus grangeri
  - †Phenacodus intermedius
  - †Phenacodus magnus
  - †Phenacodus vortmani
- †Phenacolestes – type locality for genus
  - †Phenacolestes mirandus – type locality for species
  - †Phenacolestes parallelus – type locality for species
- Phenacomys
  - †Phenacomys deeringensis
  - †Phenacomys gryci – or unidentified comparable form
  - †Phenacomys intermedius
- †Phenacoperga
  - †Phenacoperga coloradensis – type locality for species
- †Phenacopsyche – type locality for genus
  - †Phenacopsyche larvalis – type locality for species
  - †Phenacopsyche vexans – type locality for species
- †Phenanthera
  - †Phenanthera petalifera
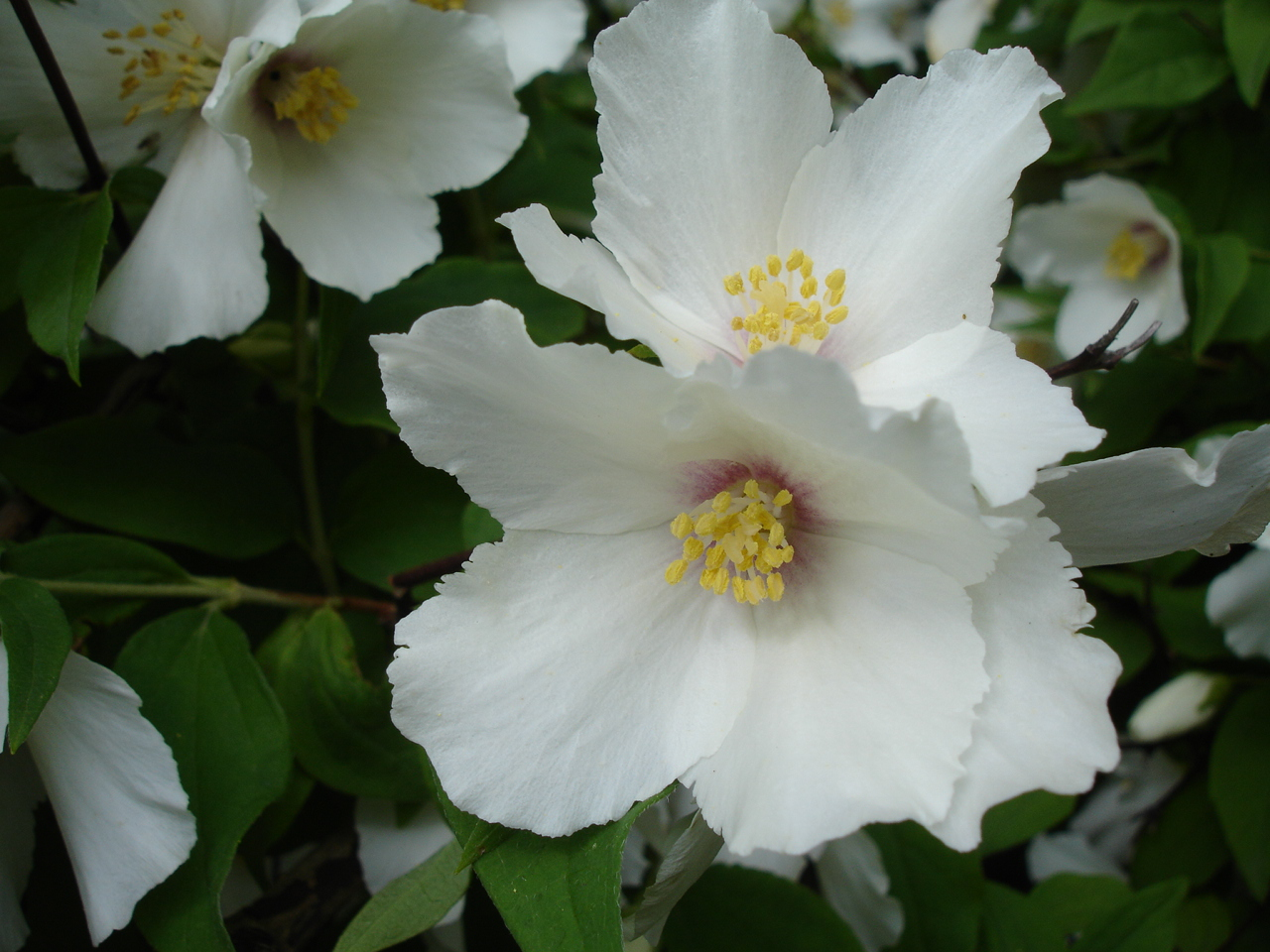
- Flowers of a living Philadelphus, or mock-orange
  Philadelphus
  - †Philadelphus minutus – type locality for species
- †Philanthus
  - †Philanthus saxigenus – type locality for species
- Philhydrus
  - †Philhydrus scudderi
- †Philonicus
  - †Philonicus saxorum – type locality for species
- Philonthus
  - †Philonthus abavus
  - †Philonthus horni – type locality for species
  - †Philonthus invelatus – type locality for species
  - †Philonthus marcidulus – type locality for species
- †Philoponites
  - †Philoponites praefractus – type locality for species
- †Philorites – type locality for genus
  - †Philorites johannseni – type locality for species
  - †Philorites pallescens – type locality for species
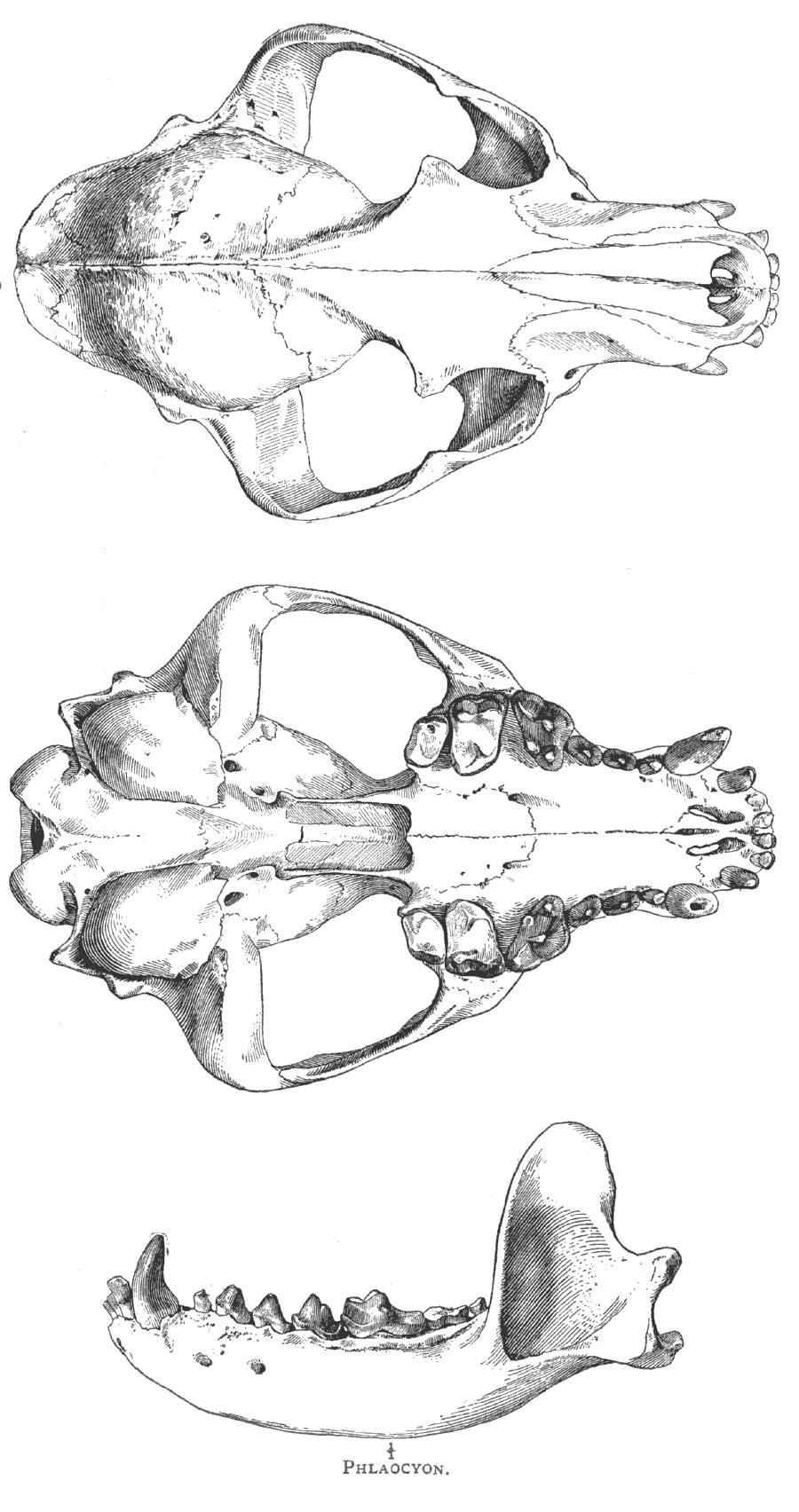
- Illustration of a fossilized skull in multiple views of the Oligocene-Miocene bone-crushing dog Phlaocyon
  †Phlaocyon
  - †Phlaocyon leucosteus – type locality for species
- †Phloeonemites – type locality for genus
  - †Phloeonemites miocenus – type locality for species
- Phloeosinus
  - †Phloeosinus scopulorum
- Phloeotribus
  - †Phloeotribus zimmermanni – type locality for species
- †Phora
  - †Phora tumbae – type locality for species
- †Phrudopamera – type locality for genus
  - †Phrudopamera chittendeni – type locality for species
  - †Phrudopamera wilsoni – type locality for species
- Phryganea
  - †Phryganea labefacta – type locality for species
  - †Phryganea miocenica – type locality for species
  - †Phryganea wickhami – type locality for species
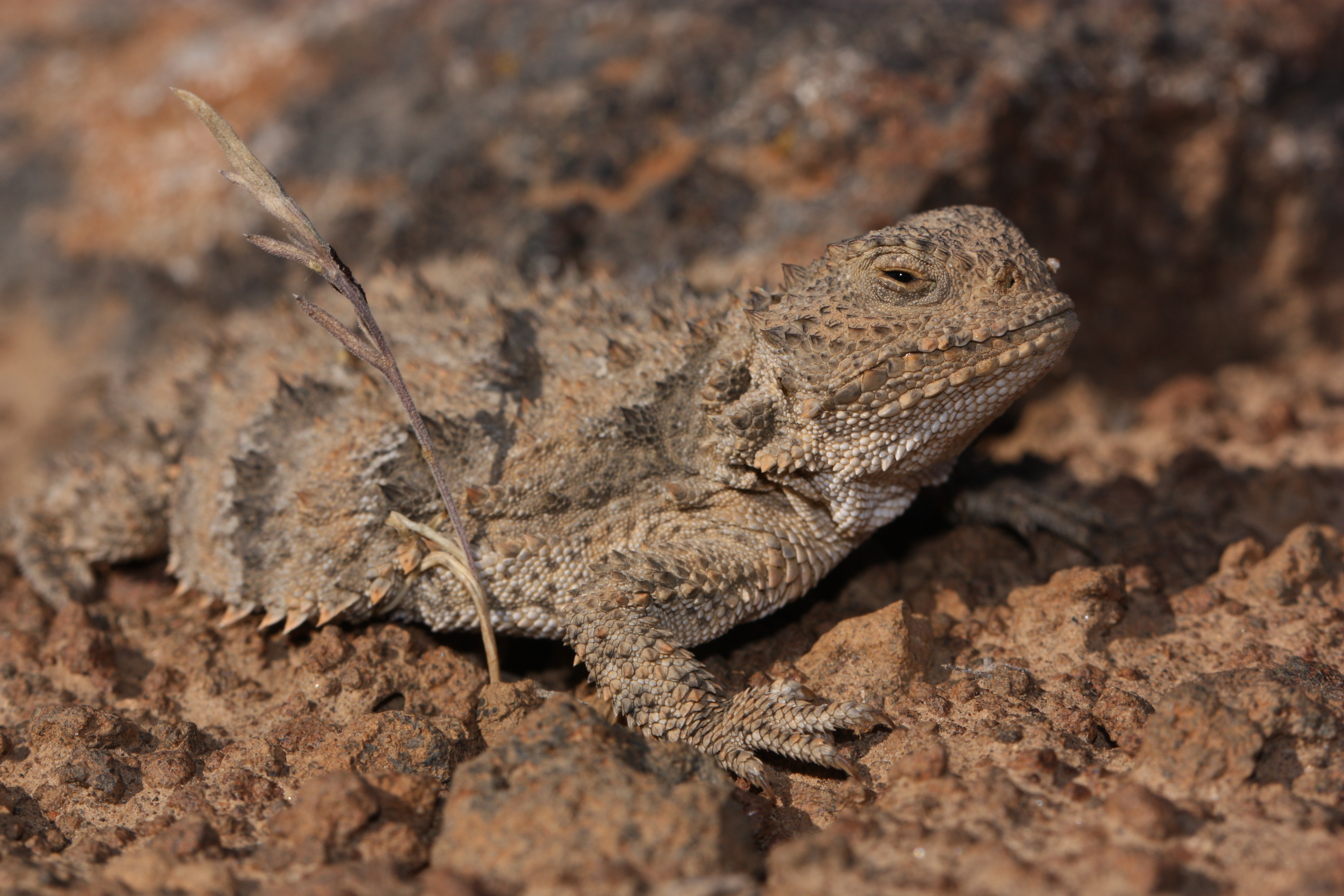
- A living Phrynosoma douglasii, or pygmy short-horned lizard
  Phrynosoma
  - †Phrynosoma douglassi
- †Phthinocoris – type locality for genus
  - †Phthinocoris colligatus – type locality for species
  - †Phthinocoris languidus – type locality for species
  - †Phthinocoris lethargicus – type locality for species
  - †Phthinocoris petraeus – type locality for species
- †Phylledestes – type locality for genus
  - †Phylledestes vorax – type locality for species
- †Phyllites
  - †Phyllites pagosensis
- †Phyllobaenus
  - †Phyllobaenus wolcotti – type locality for species
- Phyllobius
  - †Phyllobius antecessor – type locality for species
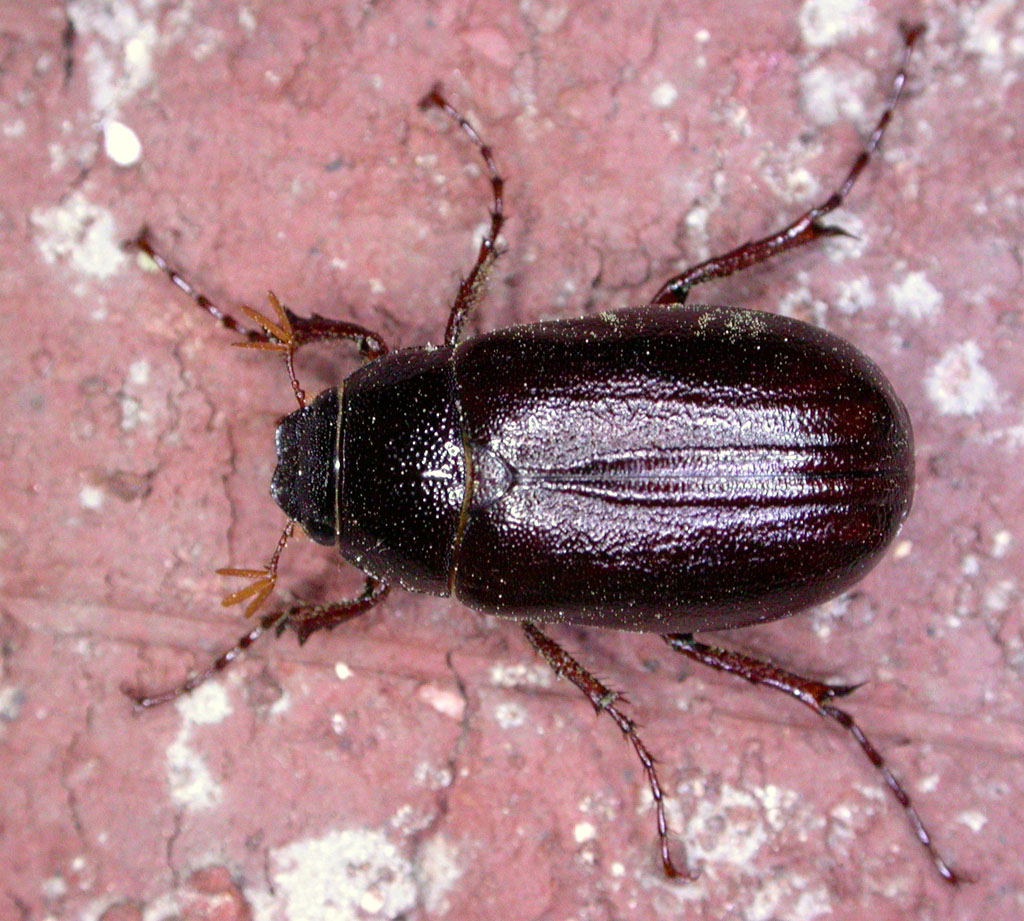
- A living Phyllophaga New World scarab
  †Phyllophaga
  - †Phyllophaga avus
  - †Phyllophaga disrupta – type locality for species
  - †Phyllophaga extincta – type locality for species
- †Phymatodes
  - †Phymatodes grandaevus – type locality for species
  - †Phymatodes miocenicus – type locality for species
  - †Phymatodes volans – type locality for species
- Pica
  - †Pica hudsonia
- Picea
  - †Picea lahontense
  - †Picea magna – type locality for species
  - †Picea pinifructus
- Picoides
  - †Picoides villosus
- †Pidonia
  - †Pidonia ingenua – type locality for species
  - †Pidonia leidyi – type locality for species
- †Piesma – tentative report
  - †Piesma rotunda – type locality for species
- †Piezocoris – type locality for genus
  - †Piezocoris compactilis – type locality for species
  - †Piezocoris peremptus – type locality for species
  - †Piezocoris peritus – type locality for species
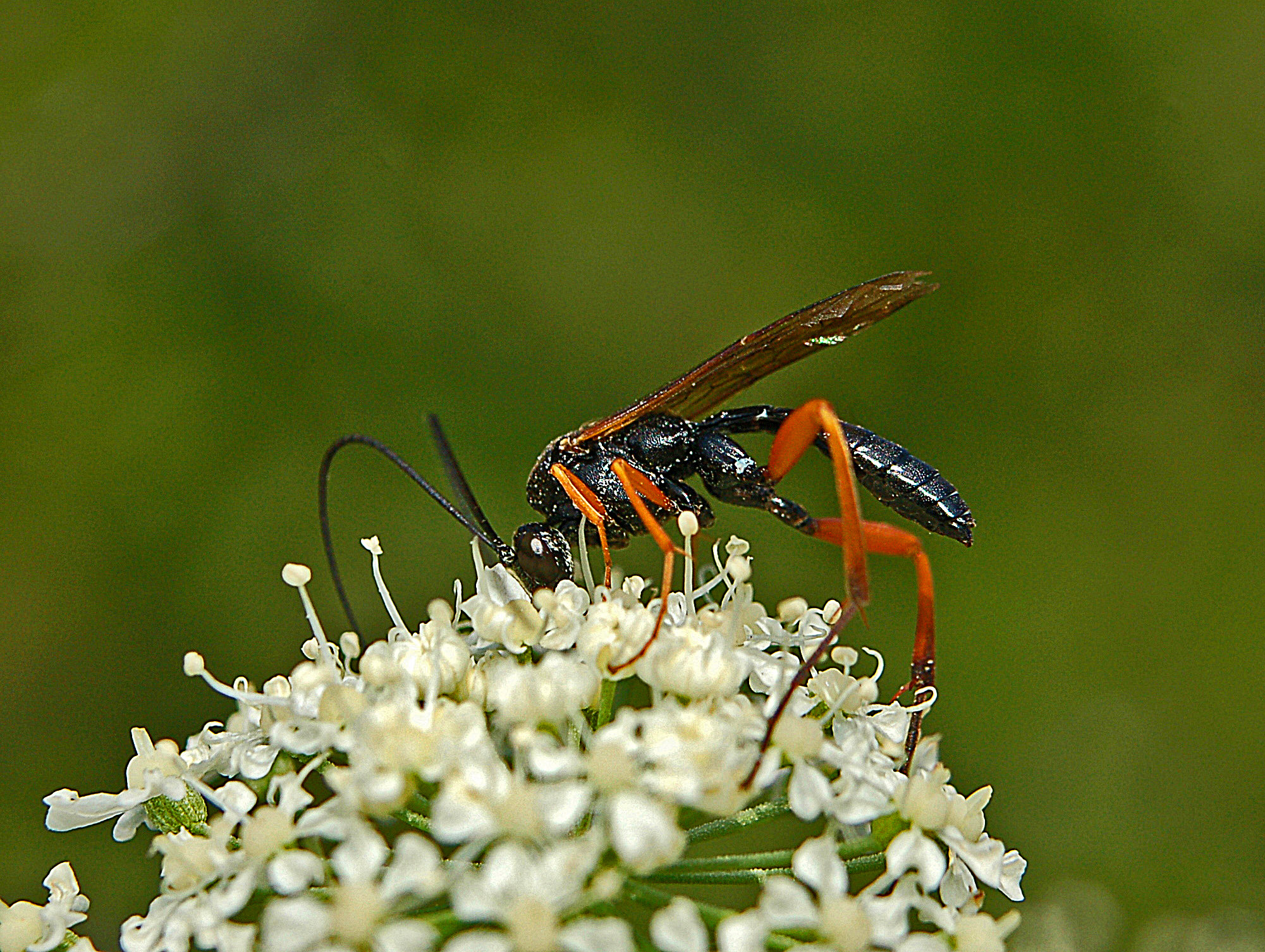
- A living Pimpla wasp
  †Pimpla
  - †Pimpla appendigera – type locality for species
  - †Pimpla eocenica – type locality for species
  - †Pimpla morticina – type locality for species
  - †Pimpla rediviva – type locality for species
  - †Pimpla revelata – type locality for species
  - †Pimpla senilis – type locality for species
- Pinus
  - †Pinus florissanti
  - †Pinus hambachi
  - †Pinus wheeleri
- †Pipiza
  - †Pipiza melanderi – type locality for species
- †Pison
  - †Pison cockerellae – type locality for species
- Pituophis
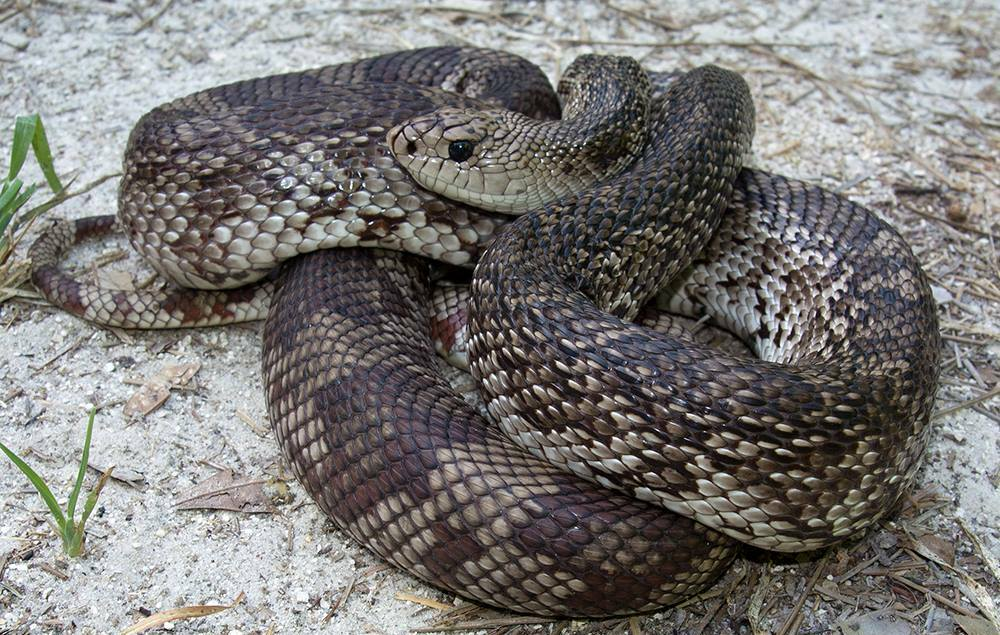
  - A living Pituophis melanoleucus, or pine snake
    †Pituophis melanoleucus
- Pityophthorus
  - †Pityophthorus opaculus
- †Plagiopodiopsis
  - †Plagiopodiopsis cockerelliae
  - †Plagiopodiopsis scudderi
- †Planocephalus – type locality for genus
  - †Planocephalus aselloides – type locality for species
- Planolinoides
  - †Planolinoides duplex
- †Plastomenus – tentative report
  - †Plastomenus lachrymalis
- †Platanites
  - †Platanites marginata
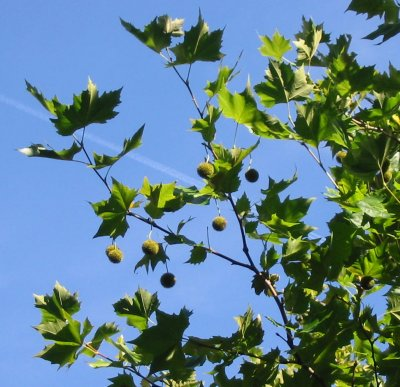
- Leaves and fruit of a living Platanus, or plane tree
  Platanus
  - †Platanus florissanti – type locality for species
  - †Platanus nobilis
  - †Platanus raynoldsi
  - †Platanus raynoldsii
  - †Platanus wyomingensis
- Plateumaris
  - †Plateumaris flavipes
  - †Plateumaris germari
  - †Plateumaris primaeva – type locality for species
  - †Plateumaris pusilla
- †Platycheirus
  - †Platycheirus lethaeus – type locality for species
  - †Platycheirus persistens – type locality for species
- Platydema
  - †Platydema antiquorum – type locality for species
  - †Platydema bethunei – type locality for species
- †Platydracus
  - †Platydracus breviantennatus – type locality for species
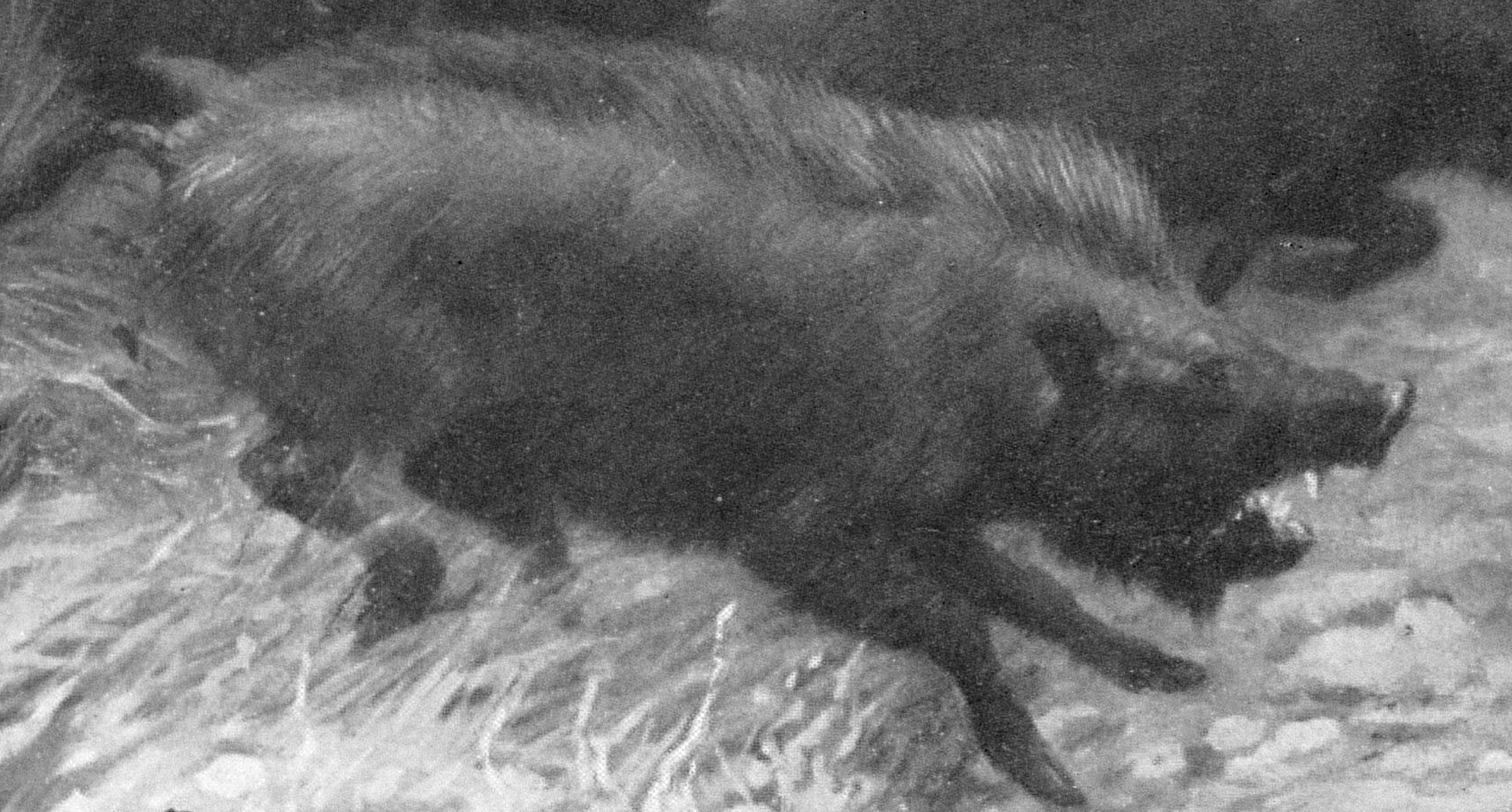
- Restoration of a herd of alarmed Miocene-Pleistocene peccaries of the genus Platygonus. Charles R. Knight (1922).
  †Platygonus
  - †Platygonus pollenae
- Platynus
  - †Platynus florissantensis – type locality for species
  - †Platynus insculptipennis – type locality for species
  - †Platynus tartareus – type locality for species
- †Platypedia
  - †Platypedia primigenia – type locality for species
- †Platyphylax
  - †Platyphylax florissantensis – type locality for species
- Platystethus
  - †Platystethus archetypus – type locality for species
  - †Platystethus carcareus – type locality for species
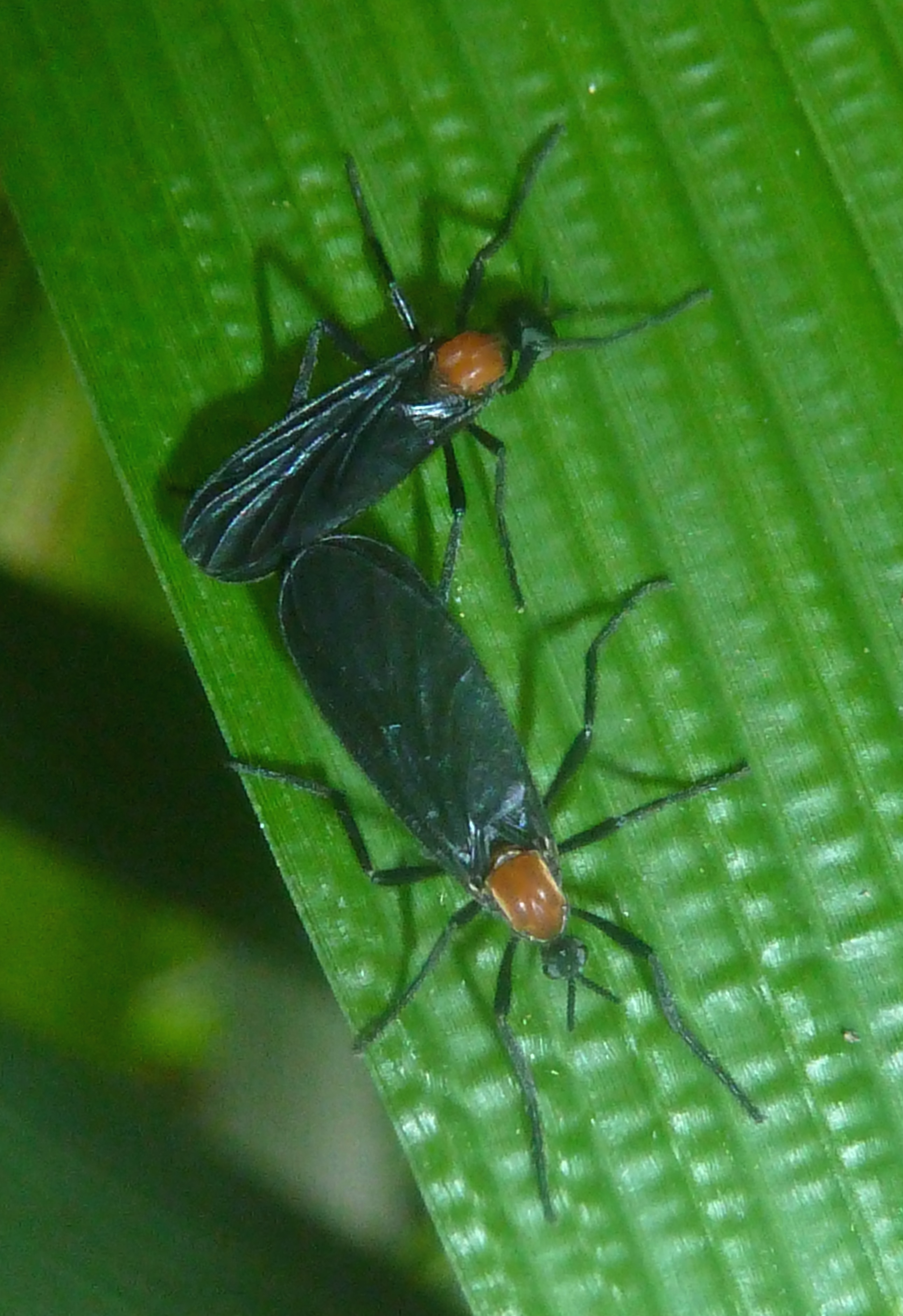
- A pair of living Plecia march flies
  Plecia
  - †Plecia akerionana
  - †Plecia axeliana – type locality for species
  - †Plecia decapitata – type locality for species
  - †Plecia explanata – type locality for species
  - †Plecia gradata – type locality for species
  - †Plecia melanderi – type locality for species
  - †Plecia orycta – type locality for species
  - †Plecia rhodopterina – type locality for species
  - †Plecia tessella – type locality for species
  - †Plecia winchesteri – type locality for species
- †Plectiscidea
  - †Plectiscidea lanhami – type locality for species
- †Plectrotetrophanes – type locality for genus
  - †Plectrotetrophanes hageni – type locality for species
- †Plesiadapis
  - †Plesiadapis dubius
  - †Plesiadapis fodinatus
- †Plesiobaena
  - †Plesiobaena antiqua – or unidentified comparable form
- †Plesiosorex
  - †Plesiosorex coloradensis – type locality for species
- †Pleurolicus
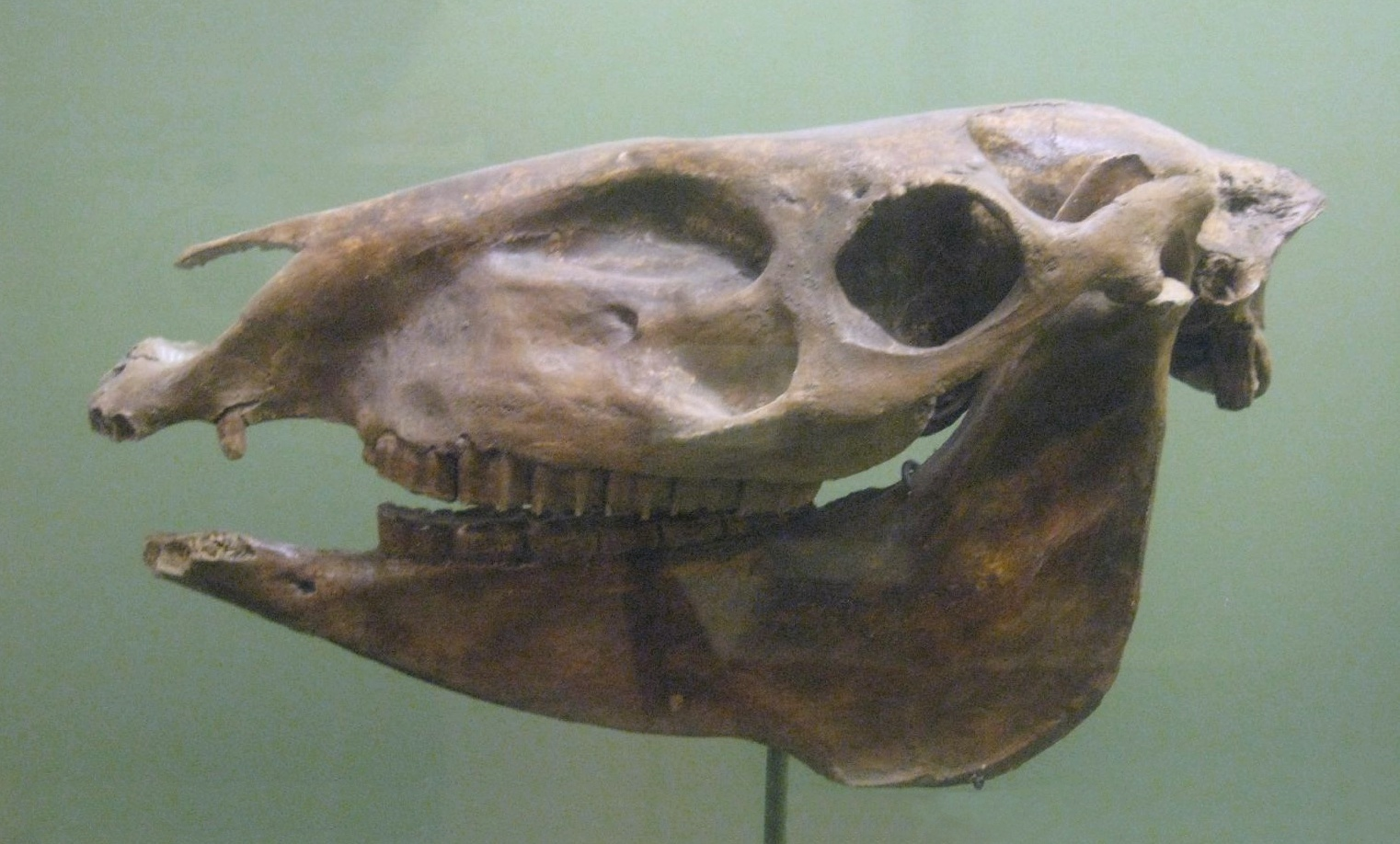
- Fossilized skull of the Miocene horse Pliohippus
  †Pliohippus
  - †Pliohippus mirabilis – type locality for species
- †Plionictis
  - †Plionictis ogygia
- †Plochionus
  - †Plochionus lesquereuxi – type locality for species
- †Poabromylus
- Podabrus
  - †Podabrus cupesoides – type locality for species
  - †Podabrus florissantensis – type locality for species
  - †Podabrus fragmentatus – type locality for species
  - †Podabrus wheeleri – type locality for species
- Podiceps
- Podilymbus
  - †Podilymbus podiceps
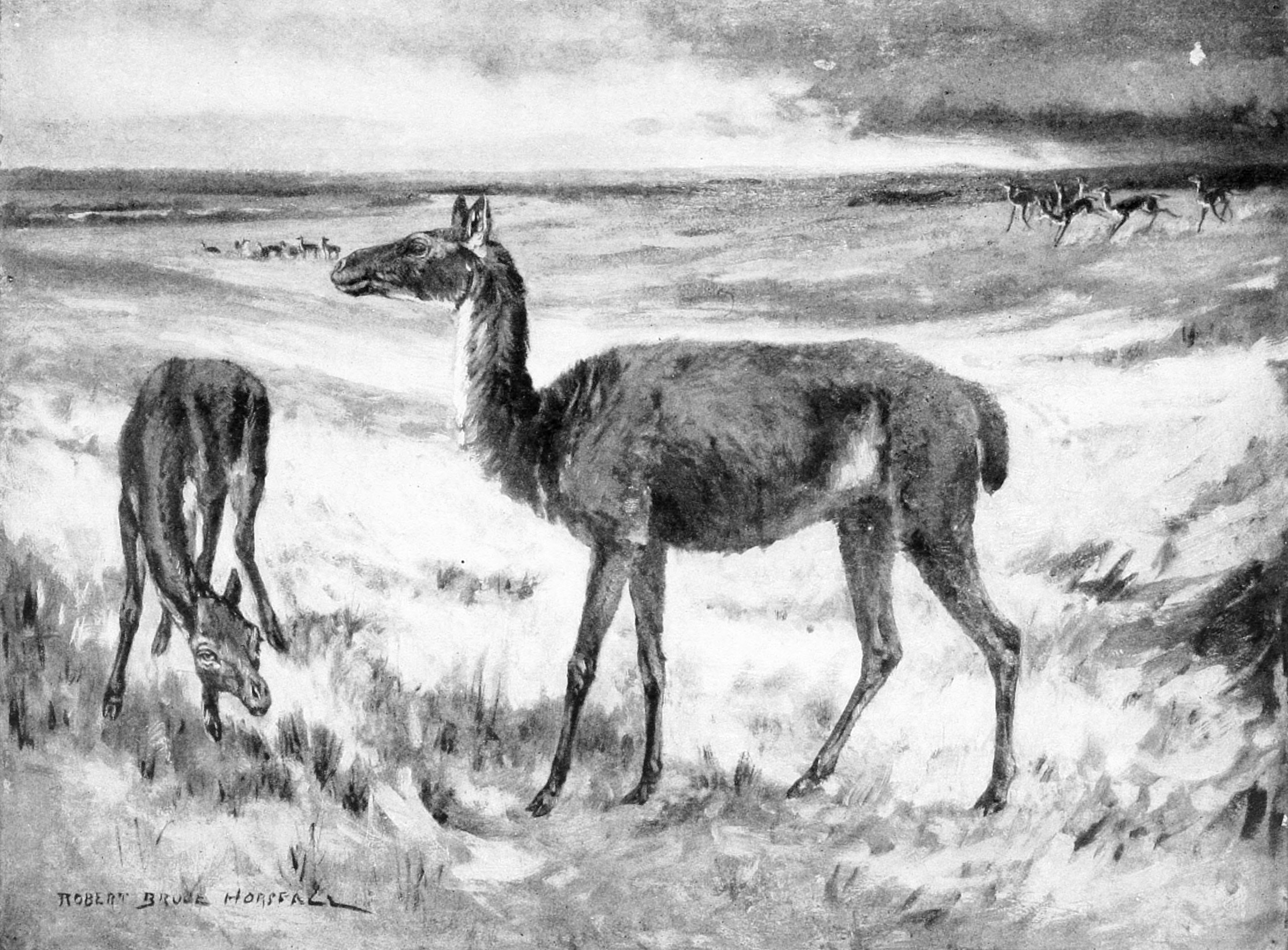
- Life restoration of the Eocene-Oligocene camel Poebrotherium
  †Poebrotherium
  - †Poebrotherium eximium
  - †Poebrotherium wilsoni
- †Poecilocapsus
  - †Poecilocapsus fremontii – type locality for species
  - †Poecilocapsus ostentus – type locality for species
  - †Poecilocapsus tabidus – type locality for species
  - †Poecilocapsus veterandus – type locality for species
  - †Poecilocapsus veternosus – type locality for species
- †Poecilognathus – type locality for genus
  - †Poecilognathus stigmalis – type locality for species
- †Pogonomyrmex
  - †Pogonomyrmex fossilis – type locality for species
- †Polemius
  - †Polemius crassicornis – type locality for species
- †Poliocoris – type locality for genus
  - †Poliocoris amnesis – type locality for species
- †Polioschistus – type locality for genus
  - †Polioschistus lapidarius – type locality for species
  - †Polioschistus ligatus – type locality for species
- †Poliosphageus – type locality for genus
  - †Poliosphageus psychrus – type locality for species
- Polycentropus
  - †Polycentropus aeternus – type locality for species
  - †Polycentropus eviratus – type locality for species
  - †Polycentropus exesus – type locality for species
- Polygraphus
  - †Polygraphus rufipennis
  - †Polygraphus wortheni – type locality for species
- †Polysphincta
  - †Polysphincta inundata – type locality for species
  - †Polysphincta mortuaria – type locality for species
  - †Polysphincta petrorum – type locality for species
- †Polystoechotites
  - †Polystoechotites piperatus – type locality for species
- †Ponerites – type locality for genus
  - †Ponerites coloradensis – type locality for species
  - †Ponerites eocenicus – type locality for species
  - †Ponerites hypoponeroides – type locality for species
- †Populites
  - †Populites heeri
- Populus
  - †Populus cinnamomoides
  - †Populus crassa
  - †Populus pyrifolia
  - †Populus wilmattae
- †Porizon
  - †Porizon exsectus – type locality for species
- Porzana
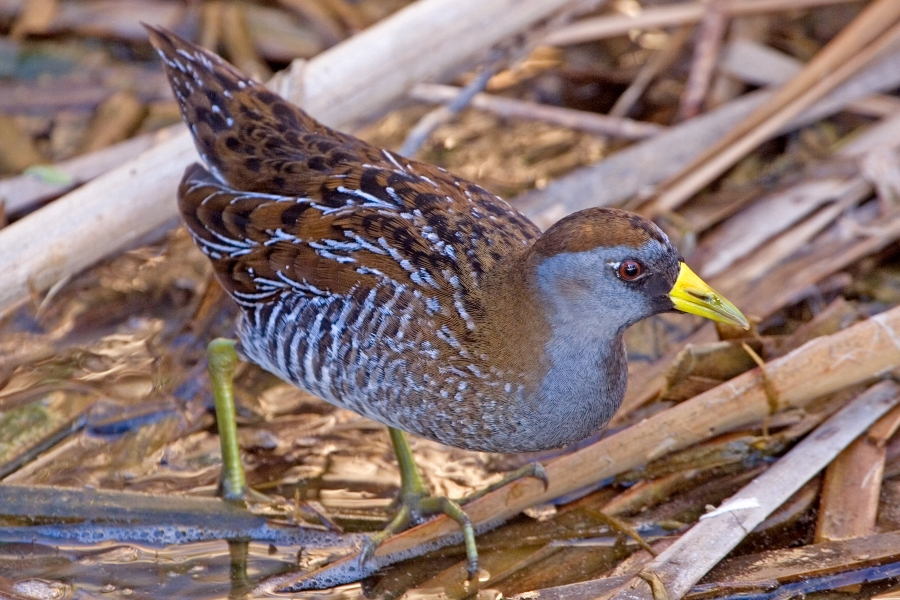
  - A living Porzana carolina, or sora
    †Porzana carolina
- †Potamogeton
  - †Potamogeton geniculatus
  - †Potamogeton verticillatus
- †Poteschistus – type locality for genus
  - †Poteschistus obnubilus – type locality for species
- †Praepapilio – type locality for genus
  - †Praepapilio colorado – type locality for species
  - †Praepapilio gracilis – type locality for species
- †Priabona
  - †Priabona florissantius – type locality for species
- †Prinecphora – type locality for genus
  - †Prinecphora balteata – type locality for species
- †Pristaulacus – type locality for genus
  - †Pristaulacus rohweri – type locality for species
  - †Pristaulacus secundus – type locality for species
- †Pristichampsus
- †Proapemon – type locality for genus
  - †Proapemon infernus – type locality for species
- †Probathyopsis
  - †Probathyopsis harrisorum – type locality for species
- †Procas
  - †Procas verberatus – type locality for species
  - †Procas vinculatus
- †Procerberus
  - †Procerberus andesiticus – type locality for species
  - †Procerberus grandis – type locality for species
- †Prochaetocnema – type locality for genus
  - †Prochaetocnema florissantella – type locality for species
- †Procoris – type locality for genus
  - †Procoris bechleri – type locality for species
  - †Procoris sanctaejohannis – type locality for species
- †Procrophius – type locality for genus
  - †Procrophius communis – type locality for species
  - †Procrophius costalis – type locality for species
  - †Procrophius languens – type locality for species
- †Proctotrypes
  - †Proctotrypes exhumatus – type locality for species
- †Procydnus – type locality for genus
  - †Procydnus devictus – type locality for species
  - †Procydnus divexus – type locality for species
  - †Procydnus eatoni – type locality for species
  - †Procydnus mamillanus
  - †Procydnus pronus – type locality for species
  - †Procydnus quietus – type locality for species
  - †Procydnus reliquus – type locality for species
  - †Procydnus vesperus – type locality for species
- †Procymus – type locality for genus
  - †Procymus cockerelli – type locality for species
- †Prodeporaides
  - †Prodeporaides laminarum – type locality for species
  - †Prodeporaides subterraneus – type locality for species
  - †Prodeporaides vulcan – type locality for species
  - †Prodeporaides wymani – type locality for species
- †Prodeporaus
  - †Prodeporaus curiosum – type locality for species
  - †Prodeporaus exanimale – type locality for species
  - †Prodeporaus exilis – type locality for species
  - †Prodeporaus minutissimus – type locality for species
  - †Prodeporaus smithii – type locality for species
- †Prodiacodon
  - †Prodiacodon tauricinerei
- †Prodipodomys
  - †Prodipodomys centralis
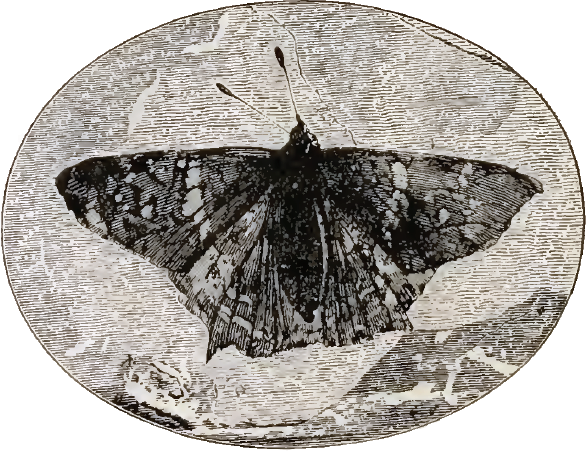
- Illustration of a fossil of the Eocene butterfly Prodryas
  †Prodryas – type locality for genus
  - †Prodryas persephone – type locality for species
- †Proelectrotermes
  - †Proelectrotermes fodinae – type locality for species
- †Progloma – type locality for genus
  - †Progloma rohweri – type locality for species
- †Proheteromys
  - †Proheteromys sulculus
- †Proiridomyrmex – type locality for genus
  - †Proiridomyrmex vetulus – type locality for species
- †Prokalotermes
  - †Prokalotermes hagenii – type locality for species
- †Prolibythea – type locality for genus
  - †Prolibythea florissanti – type locality for species
  - †Prolibythea vagabunda – type locality for species
- †Prolimnocyon
  - †Prolimnocyon atavus
  - †Prolimnocyon haematus
- †Prolygaeus – type locality for genus
  - †Prolygaeus inundatus – type locality for species
- †Promioclaenus
  - †Promioclaenus acolytus
- †Pronemobius
  - †Pronemobius ornatipes – type locality for species
  - †Pronemobius tertiarius – tentative report
- †Propalaeanodon
- †Prophilanthus – type locality for genus
  - †Prophilanthus destructus – type locality for species
- †Proscalops
  - †Proscalops miocaenus – type locality for species
  - †Proscalops secundus – or unidentified comparable form
- †Prosigara – type locality for genus
  - †Prosigara flabellum – type locality for species
- †Prosoeca – type locality for genus
  - †Prosoeca florigera – type locality for species
- Prosopis
  - †Prosopis linearfolia
- †Protacnaeus – type locality for genus
  - †Protacnaeus tenuicornis – type locality for species
- †Protapate – type locality for genus
  - †Protapate contorta – type locality for species
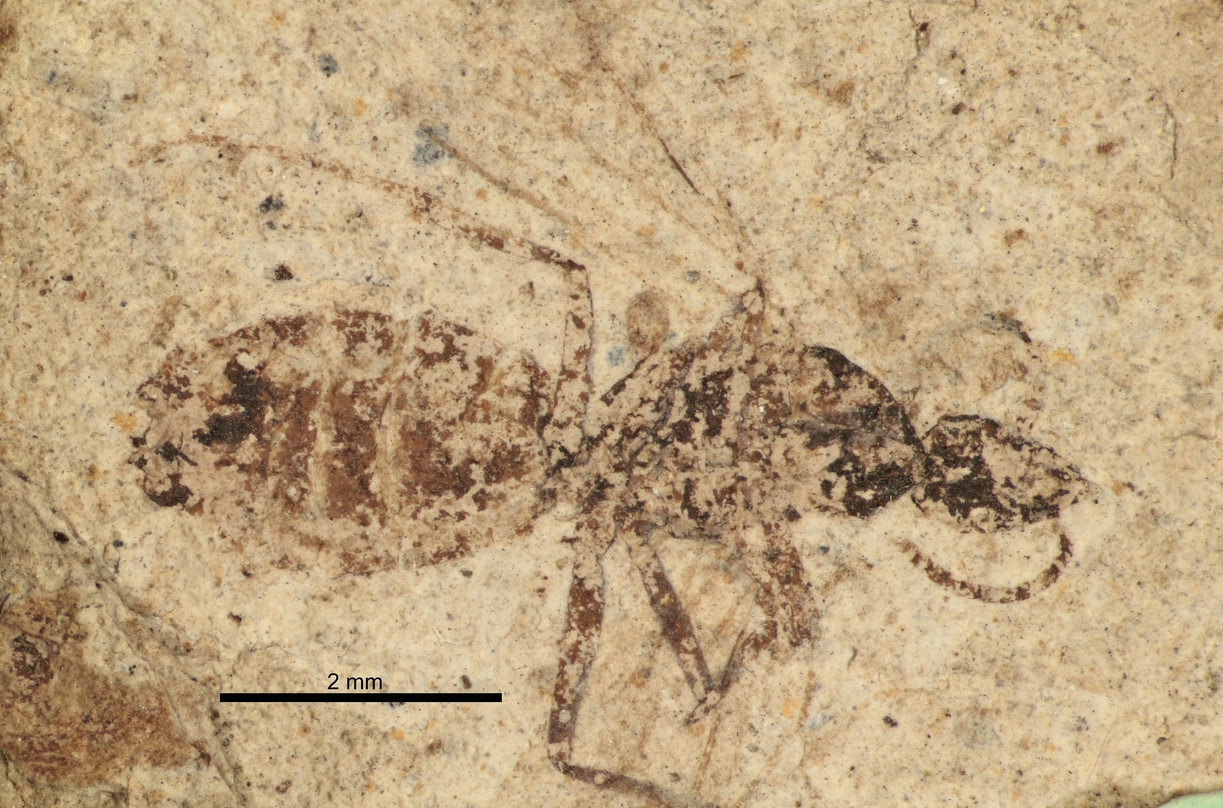
- Fossil of the Oligocene ant Protazteca
  †Protazteca – type locality for genus
  - †Protazteca capitata – type locality for species
  - †Protazteca elongata – type locality for species
  - †Protazteca hendersoni – type locality for species
  - †Protazteca quadrata – type locality for species
- †Proteleates – type locality for genus
  - †Proteleates centralis – type locality for species
- †Protenor
  - †Protenor imbecillis – type locality for species
- †Protictis
  - †Protictis proteus
- †Protipochus – type locality for genus
  - †Protipochus vandykei – type locality for species
- †Protochrysotoxum – type locality for genus
  - †Protochrysotoxum sphinx – type locality for species
- †Protoedalea
  - †Protoedalea brachystoma – type locality for species
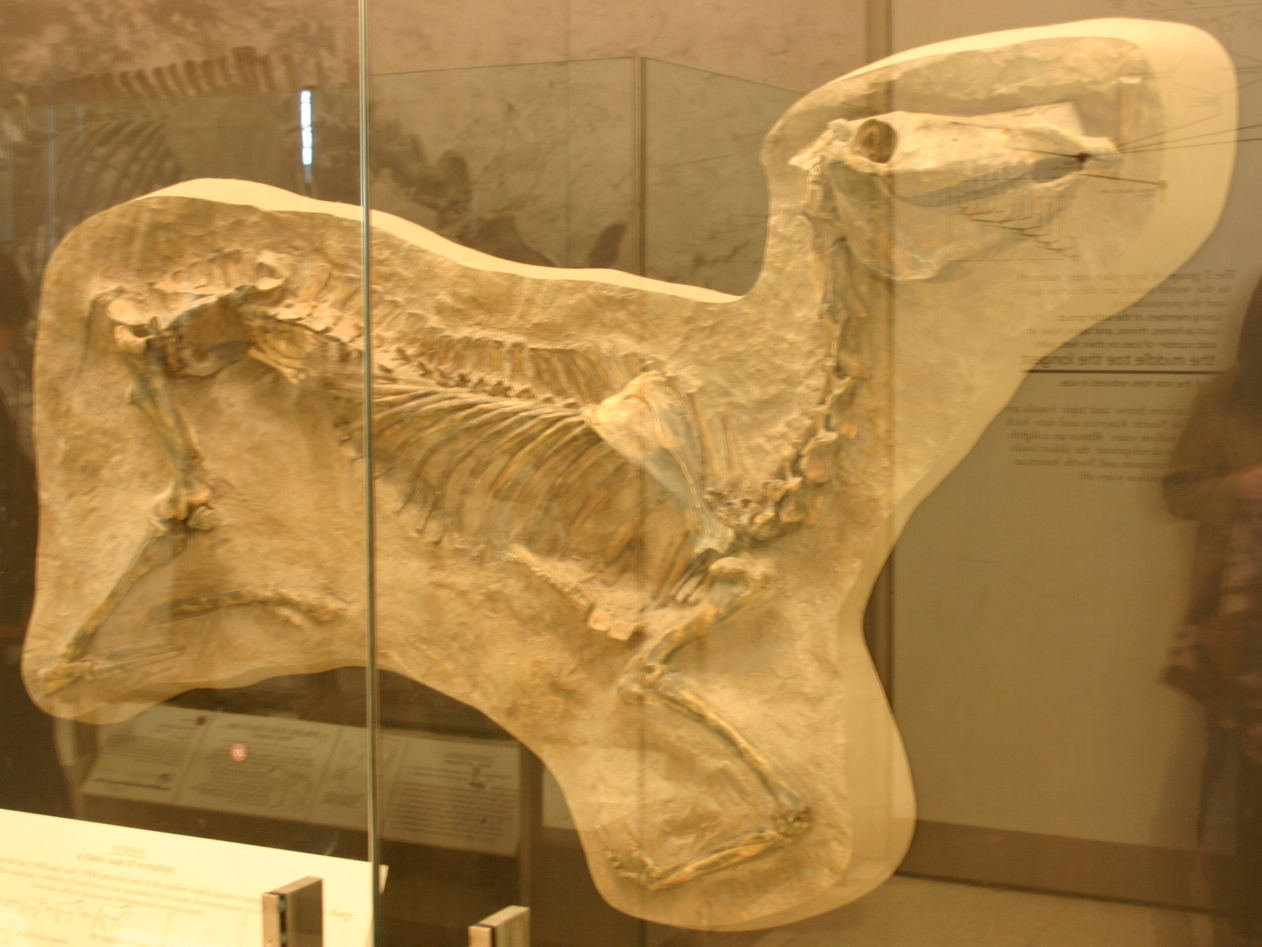
- Fossilized skeleton of the Miocene horse Protohippus
  †Protohippus
- †Protoibalia
  - †Protoibalia connexiva – type locality for species
- †Protolabis
  - †Protolabis heterodontus
- †Protoliarus – type locality for genus
  - †Protoliarus amabilis – type locality for species
  - †Protoliarus humatus – type locality for species
- †Protomarctus
  - †Protomarctus optatus
- †Protomelecta – type locality for genus
  - †Protomelecta brevipennis – type locality for species
- †Protoncideres – type locality for genus
  - †Protoncideres primus – type locality for species
- †Protoplatycera – type locality for genus
  - †Protoplatycera laticornis – type locality for species
- †Protoreodon
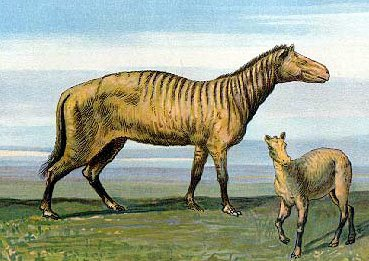
- Protorohippus
  †Protorohippus
  - †Protorohippus venticolum
- †Protospermophilus
  - †Protospermophilus kelloggi
- †Protostephanus – type locality for genus
  - †Protostephanus ashmeadi – type locality for species
- †Prototomus
  - †Prototomus deimos
  - †Prototomus martis
  - †Prototomus phobos
  - †Prototomus secundarius
- †Protungulatum
  - †Protungulatum donnae
- Prunus
  - †Prunus coloradensis
  - †Prunus corrugis
  - †Prunus gracilis
- †Psammaecius
  - †Psammaecius sepultus – type locality for species
- †Psapharochus
  - †Psapharochus lengii – type locality for species
- †Psephenus
  - †Psephenus lutulentus – type locality for species
- Pseudacris
  - †Pseudacris triseriata
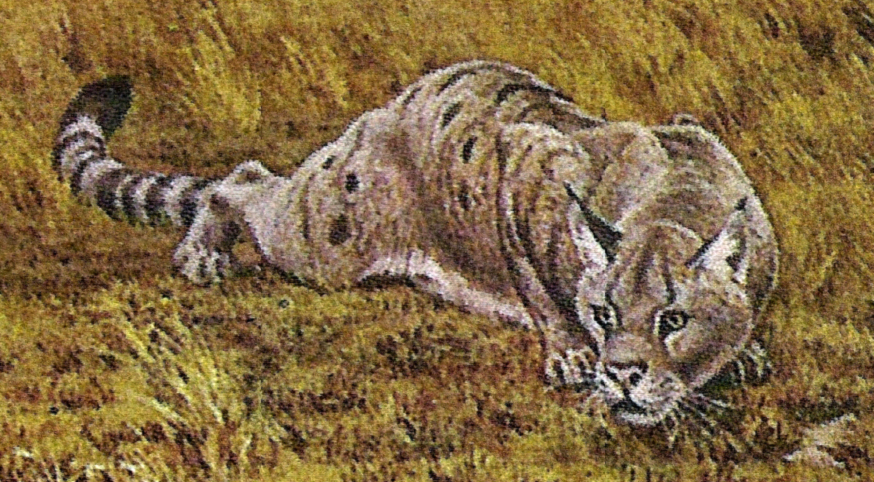
- Restoration of the Miocene cat Pseudaelurus
  †Pseudaelurus
  - †Pseudaelurus stouti
- †Pseudhipparion
- †Pseudocimbex – type locality for genus
  - †Pseudocimbex clavatus – type locality for species
- †Pseudocylindrodon
  - †Pseudocylindrodon neglectus – or unidentified comparable form
- †Pseudomesauletes
  - †Pseudomesauletes culex – type locality for species
  - †Pseudomesauletes ibis – type locality for species
  - †Pseudomesauletes obliquus – type locality for species
  - †Pseudomesauletes striaticeps – type locality for species
- Pseudomyrmex
  - †Pseudomyrmex extinctus – type locality for species
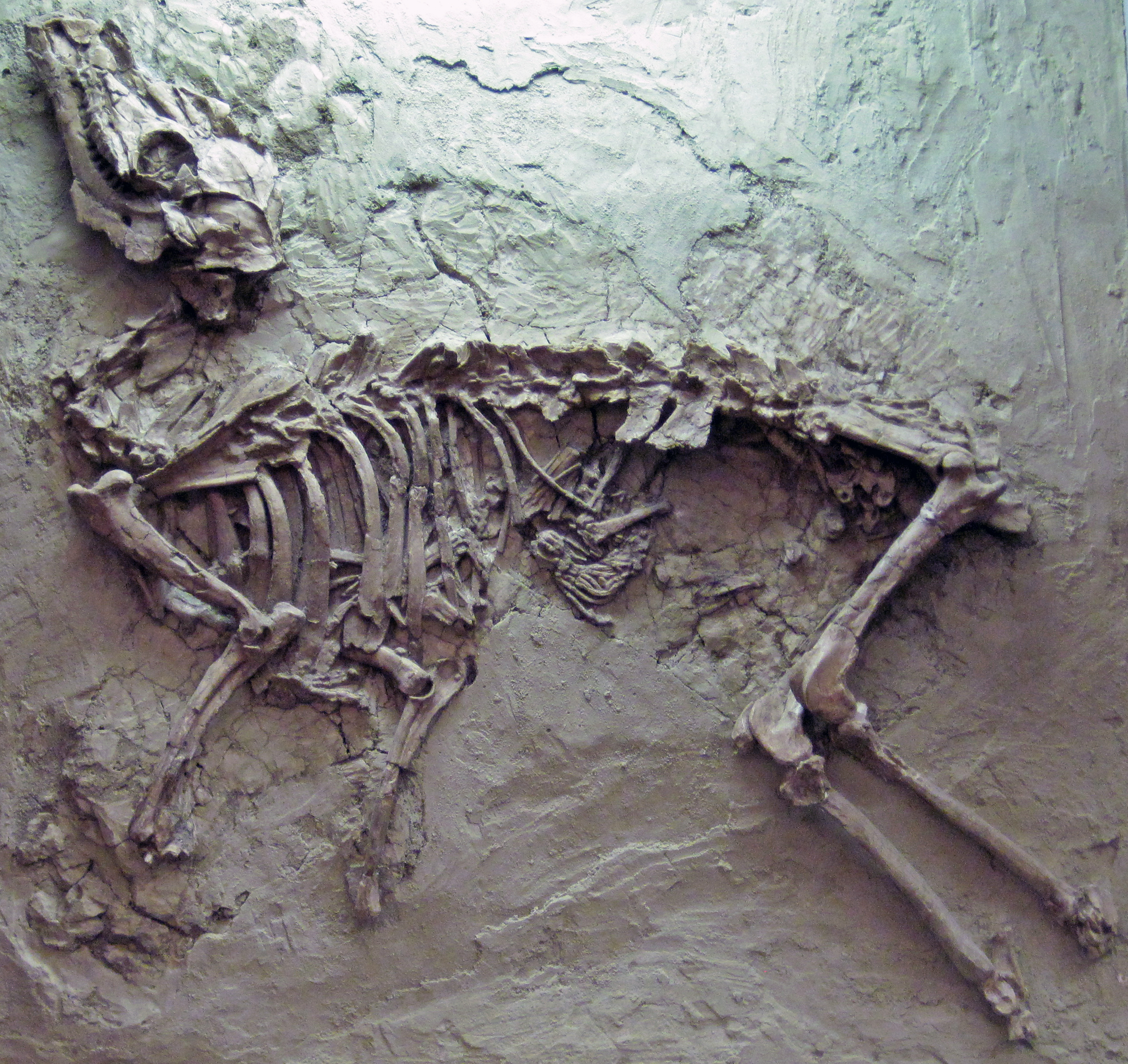
- Fossilized skeleton of the Eocene protoceratid mammal Pseudoprotoceras
  †Pseudoprotoceras
  - †Pseudoprotoceras longinaris
- †Pseudosiobla
  - †Pseudosiobla megoura – type locality for species
  - †Pseudosiobla misera – type locality for species
- †Pseudosmylidia – type locality for genus
  - †Pseudosmylidia relicta – type locality for species
- †Pseudotetonius
  - †Pseudotetonius ambiguus
- †Pseudotheridomys
  - †Pseudotheridomys hesperus
- †Pseudotrimylus
  - †Pseudotrimylus compressus
  - †Pseudotrimylus roperi
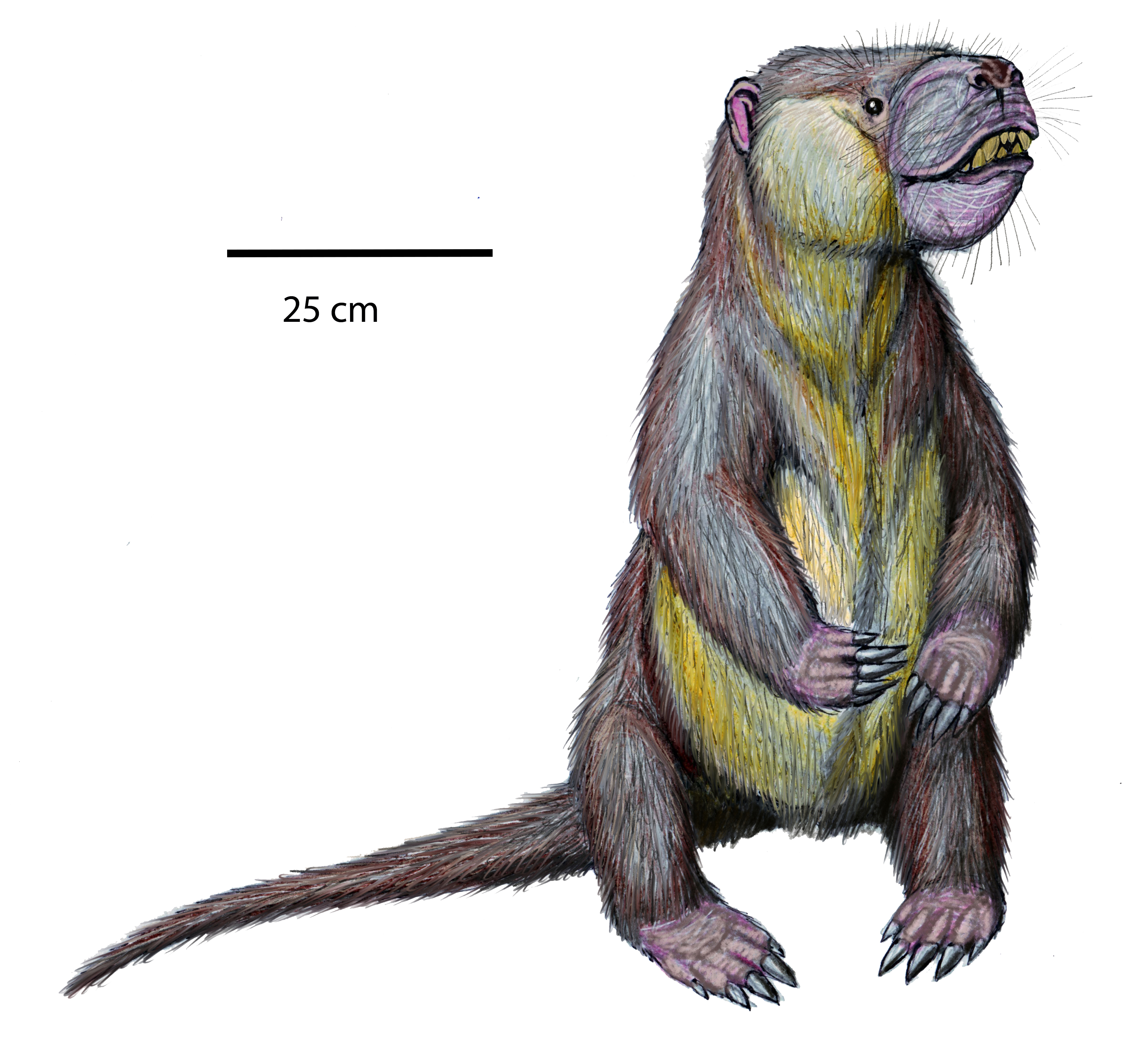
- Life restoration of the Paleocene taeniodont mammal Psittacotherium multifragum
  †Psittacotherium
- Ptelea
  - †Ptelea cassiodes
- Pterocarya
  - †Pterocarya hispida
  - †Pterocarya roanensis – type locality for species
- †Pterogaulus
  - †Pterogaulus laevis
- †Pteromalus
  - †Pteromalus exanimis – type locality for species
- †Pteromogoplistes
  - †Pteromogoplistes grandis – type locality for species
  - †Pteromogoplistes smithii – tentative report
- †Pteronus
  - †Pteronus prodigus – type locality for species
- Pterostichus
  - †Pterostichus pumpellyi – type locality for species
  - †Pterostichus walcotti
- †Pterotriamescaptor – tentative report
  - †Pterotriamescaptor americanus – type locality for species
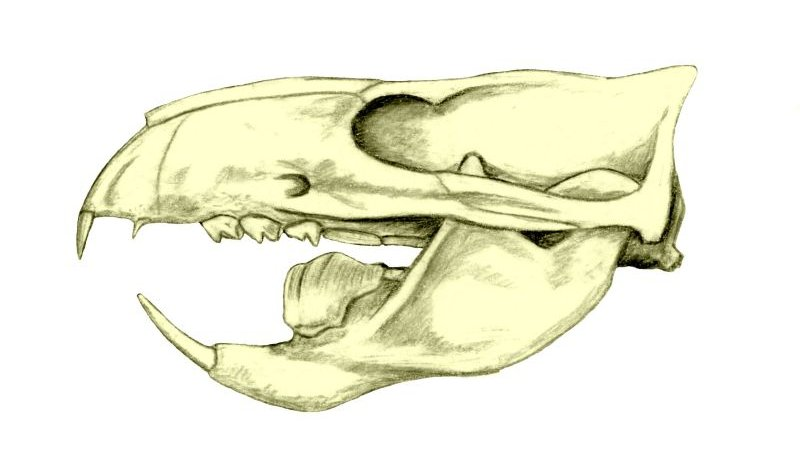
- Illustration of a fossilized skull of the Paleocene multituberculate mammal Ptilodus
  †Ptilodus
  - †Ptilodus kummae
- †Ptosima
  - †Ptosima abyssa – type locality for species
  - †Ptosima schaefferi – type locality for species
  - †Ptosima silvatica – type locality for species
- †Ptychoptera
  - †Ptychoptera miocenica – type locality for species
- †Pulverflumen
- Pycnoglypta
  - †Pycnoglypta lurida
- †Pythoceropsis – type locality for genus
  - †Pythoceropsis singularis – type locality for species

== Q ==
- †Quadratomus
  - †Quadratomus grandis
- Quedius
  - †Quedius breweri – type locality for species
  - †Quedius chamberlini – type locality for species
  - †Quedius mortuus – type locality for species
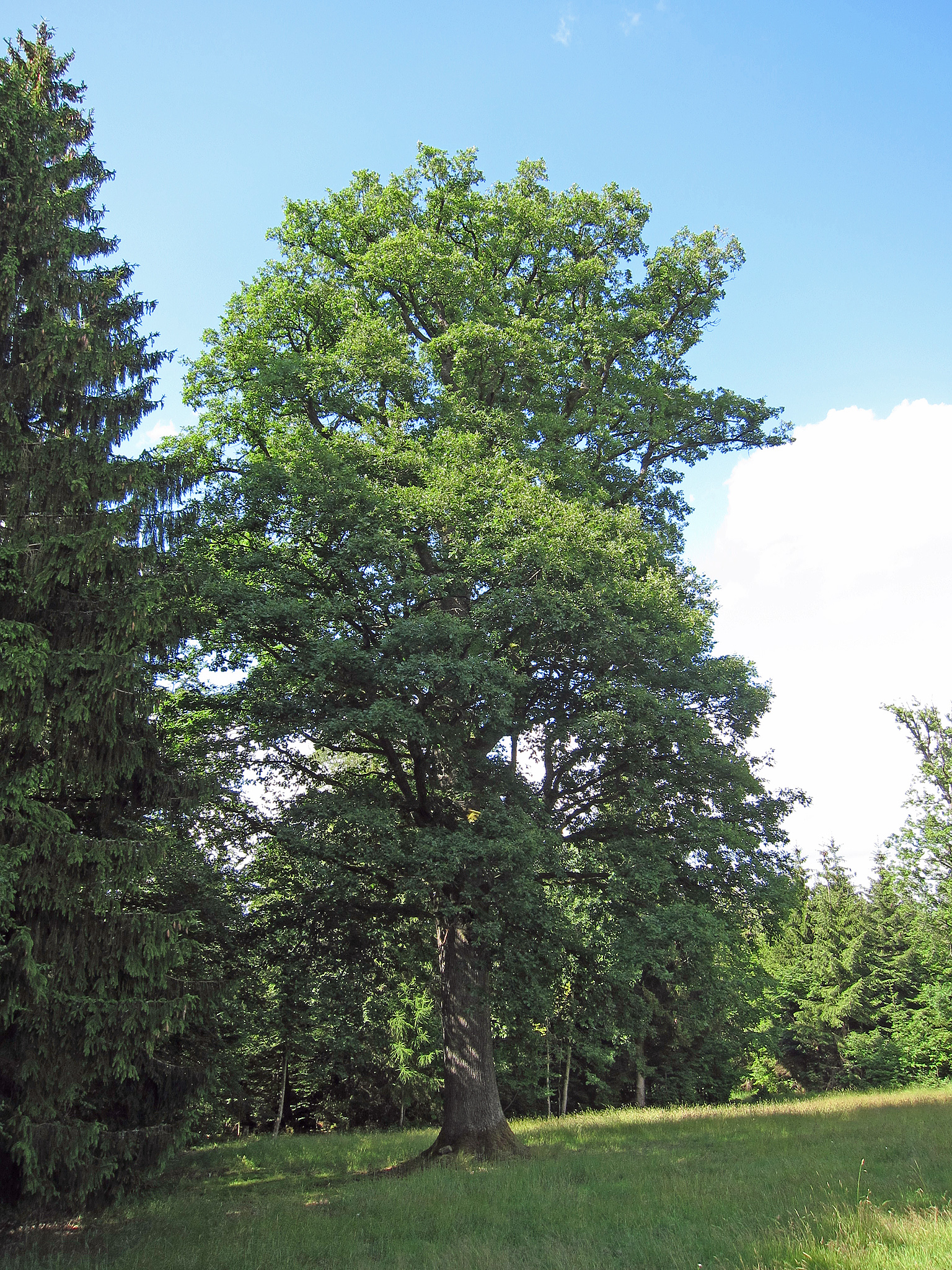
- A living Quercus, or oak tree
  Quercus
  - †Quercus balaninorum
  - †Quercus dumosoides
  - †Quercus greenlandica
  - †Quercus knowltoniana
  - †Quercus lyratiformis
  - †Quercus mohavensis
  - †Quercus orbata
  - †Quercus perdayana – type locality for species
  - †Quercus peritula
  - †Quercus schottii
  - †Quercus scottii
  - †Quercus scudderi
  - †Quercus sullyi

== R ==
- Rallus
  - †Rallus limicola
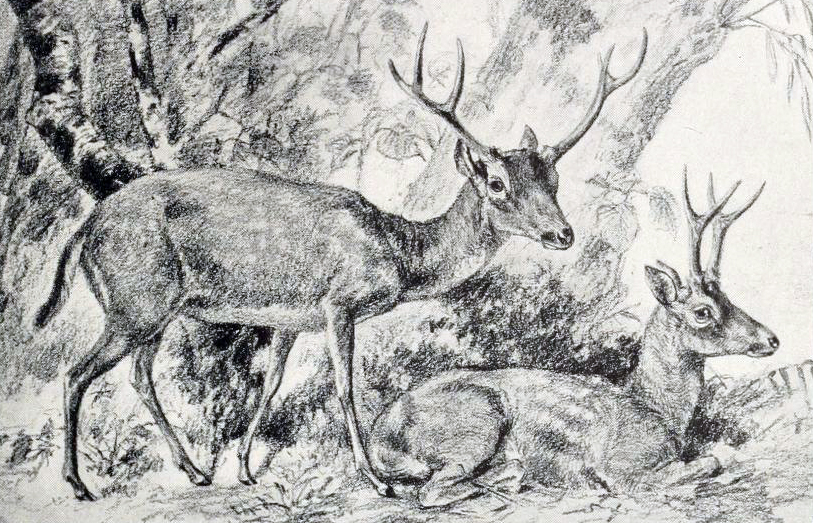
- Life restoration of the Miocene-Pliocene pronghorn Ramoceros and Cosoryx. Robert Bruce Horsfall (1913).
  †Ramoceros
  - †Ramoceros osborni
- †Rana
  - †Rana catesbeiana
- †Raphidia
  - †Raphidia creedei – type locality for species
- †Reichertella
  - †Reichertella fasciata – type locality for species
- Reithrodontomys
- †Reithroparamys
  - †Reithroparamys debequensis – type locality for species
- †Rembus – tentative report
  - †Rembus henshawi – type locality for species
- Reticulitermes
  - †Reticulitermes creedei – type locality for species
  - †Reticulitermes fossarum – type locality for species
- Rhabdomastix
  - †Rhabdomastix frigida – type locality for species
  - †Rhabdomastix labefactata – type locality for species
  - †Rhabdomastix praecursor – type locality for species
  - †Rhabdomastix primogenitalis
  - †Rhabdomastix profundi – type locality for species
  - †Rhabdomastix scudderi – type locality for species
- †Rhadinobrochus
  - †Rhadinobrochus extinctus – type locality for species
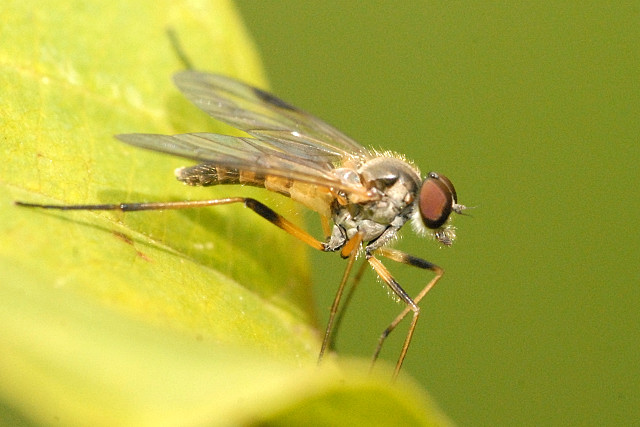
- A living Rhagio snipefly
  †Rhagio
  - †Rhagio fossitius – type locality for species
  - †Rhagio wheeleri – type locality for species
- †Rhagoderidea – type locality for genus
  - †Rhagoderidea striata – type locality for species
- Rhagonycha
  - †Rhagonycha hesperus – type locality for species
- †Rhamnites
  - †Rhamnites pseudostenophyllus
- †Rhamnus
  - †Rhamnus cleburni
  - †Rhamnus goldiana
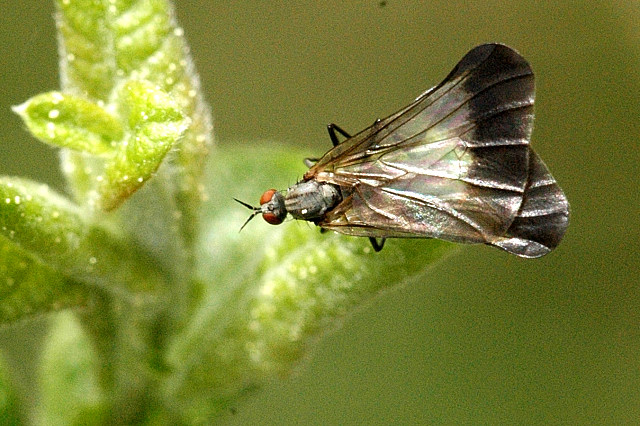
- A living Rhamphomyia dance fly
  †Rhamphomyia
  - †Rhamphomyia aeterna – type locality for species
  - †Rhamphomyia craterae – type locality for species
  - †Rhamphomyia enena – type locality for species
  - †Rhamphomyia fossa – type locality for species
  - †Rhamphomyia hypolitha – type locality for species
  - †Rhamphomyia inanimata – type locality for species
  - †Rhamphomyia infernalis – type locality for species
  - †Rhamphomyia interita – type locality for species
  - †Rhamphomyia morticina – type locality for species
  - †Rhamphomyia senecta – type locality for species
  - †Rhamphomyia sepulta – type locality for species
  - †Rhamphomyia spodites – type locality for species
  - †Rhamphomyia tumulata – type locality for species
- †Rhepocoris – type locality for genus
  - †Rhepocoris macrescens – type locality for species
  - †Rhepocoris minima – type locality for species
  - †Rhepocoris praetectus – type locality for species
  - †Rhepocoris praevalens – type locality for species
  - †Rhepocoris propinquans – type locality for species
- Rhineastes
  - †Rhineastes peltatus
  - †Rhineastes smithi
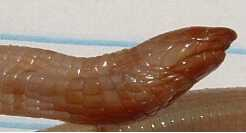
- A living Rhineura floridana, or North American worm lizard
  Rhineura
  - †Rhineura hatcheri
  - †Rhineura hatcherii – type locality for species
- †Rhingia
  - †Rhingia zephyrea – type locality for species
- †Rhingiopsis
  - †Rhingiopsis prisculus – type locality for species
- Rhizophagus
  - †Rhizophagus remotus
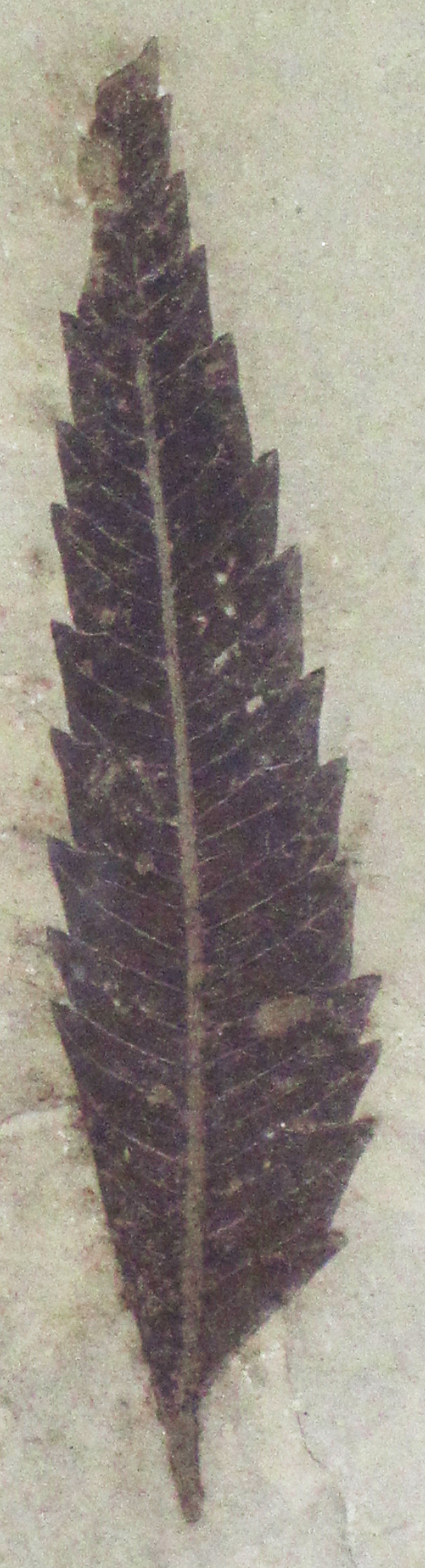
- A Rhus nigricans leaf
  Rhus
  - †Rhus lesquereuxi
  - †Rhus migricans
  - †Rhus nigricans
  - †Rhus obscura
  - †Rhus stellariaefolia
- †Rhyparochromus
  - †Rhyparochromus verrillii – type locality for species
- †Rhysosternum
  - †Rhysosternum aeternabile – type locality for species
  - †Rhysosternum longirostre – type locality for species
- †Rhyssa
  - †Rhyssa petiolata – type locality for species
- †Rhyssomatus
  - †Rhyssomatus tabescens – type locality for species
- †Ribes
  - †Ribes errans – type locality for species
- †Riodinella – type locality for genus
  - †Riodinella nympha – type locality for species
- †Robinia
  - †Robinia lesquereuxi
  - †Robinia wardi
- †Rogas
  - †Rogas tertiarius – type locality for species
- Rosa
  - †Rosa hilliae
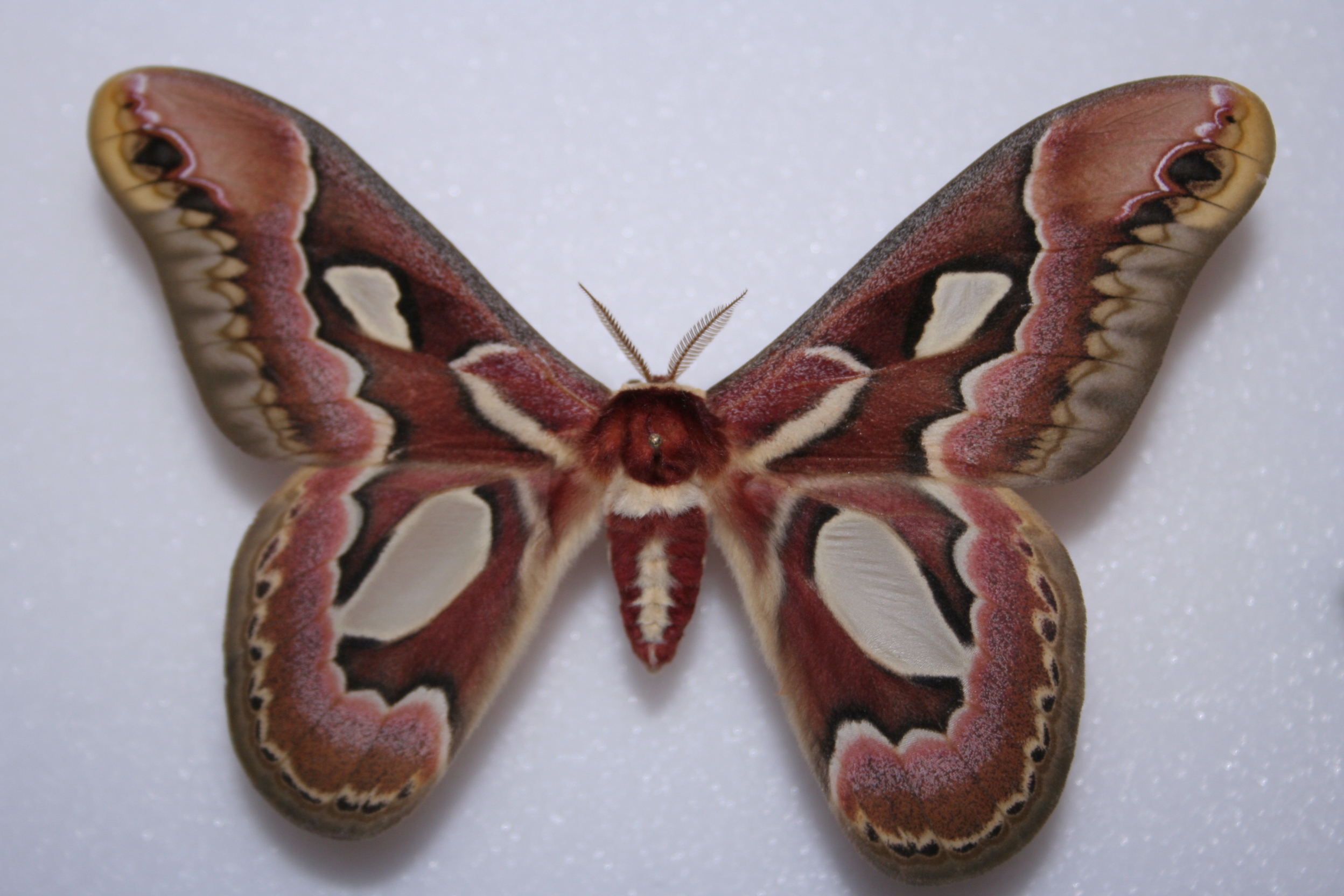
- A living Rothschildia moth
  †Rothschildia
  - †Rothschildia fossilis – type locality for species
- Rubus
  - †Rubus coloradensis
- †Runaria – type locality for genus
  - †Runaria ostenta – type locality for species
- †Rupiforficula
  - †Rupiforficula inferna – type locality for species
  - †Rupiforficula labens – type locality for species
  - †Rupiforficula scudderi – type locality for species

== S ==
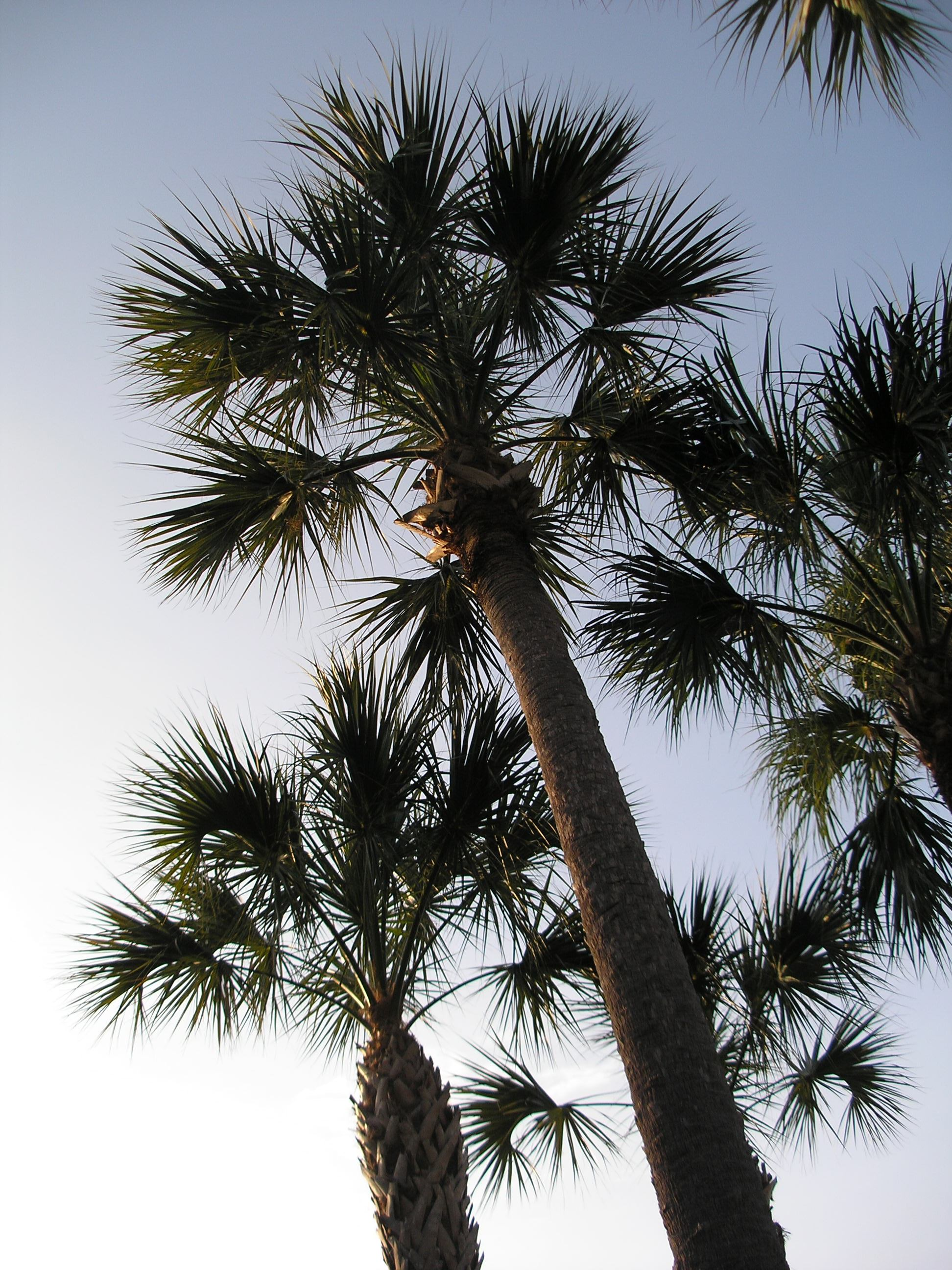
- Living Sabal, or palmettos
  Sabal
  - †Sabal grayana
  - †Sabal imperialis
- †Saccoloma
  - †Saccoloma gardneri
- †Sackenia – type locality for genus
  - †Sackenia arcuata – type locality for species
- Salix
  - †Salix coloradensis
  - †Salix coloradica – type locality for species
  - †Salix libbeyi
  - †Salix longiacuminata
  - †Salix longipetiolatum – or unidentified comparable form
  - †Salix ramaleyi
  - †Salix taxifolioides
- †Sambucus
  - †Sambucus newtoni
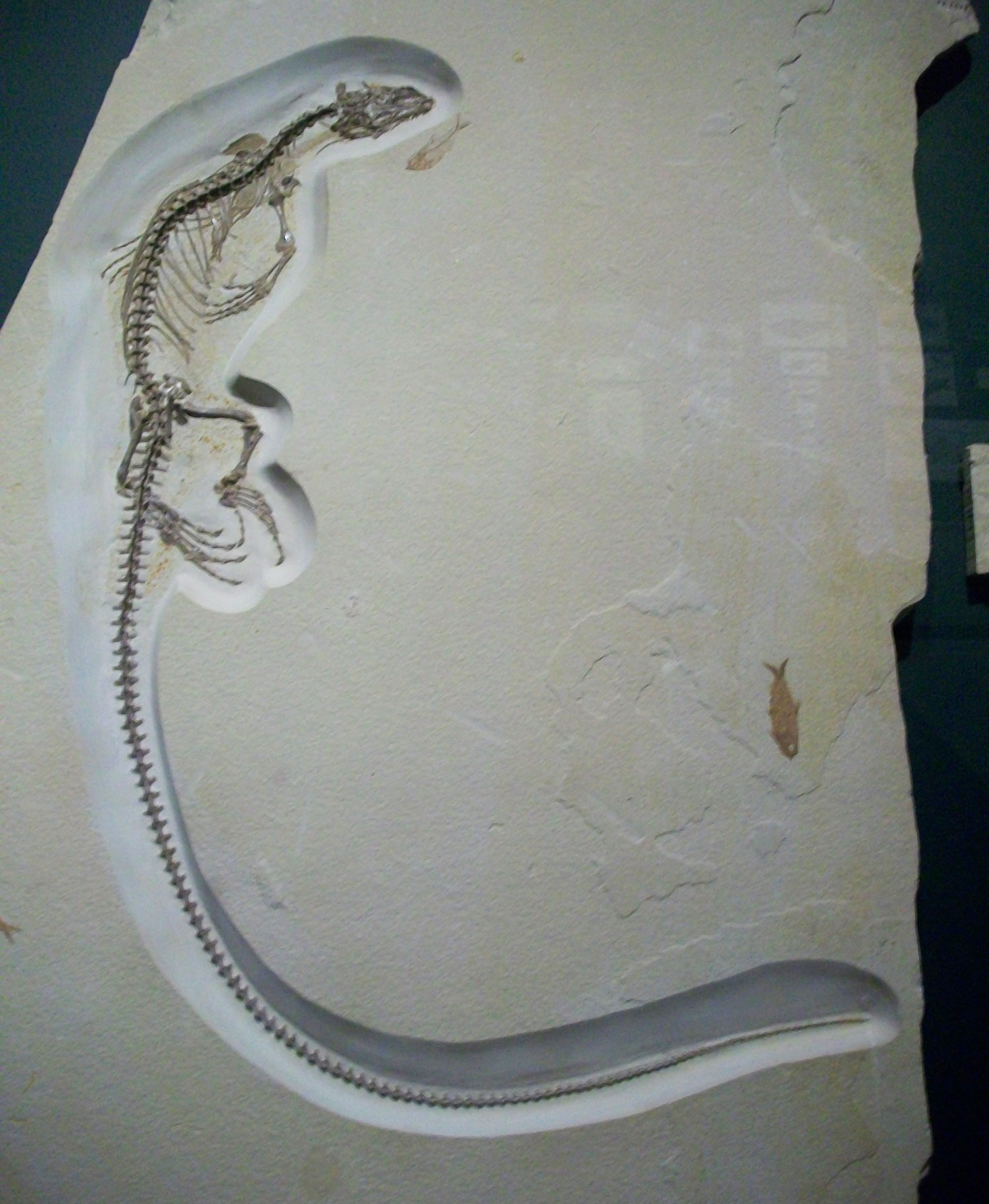
- Fossilized skeleton of the Eocene monitor lizard Saniwa
  †Saniwa
- †Saperda
  - †Saperda caroli – type locality for species
  - †Saperda florissantensis – type locality for species
- †Saperdirhynchus – type locality for genus
  - †Saperdirhynchus priscotitillator – type locality for species
- †Sapindus
  - †Sapindus coloradensis
- †Sapromyza
  - †Sapromyza veterana – type locality for species
- †Saropogon
  - †Saropogon oblitescens – type locality for species
- Sassafras
  - †Sassafras CR010 informal
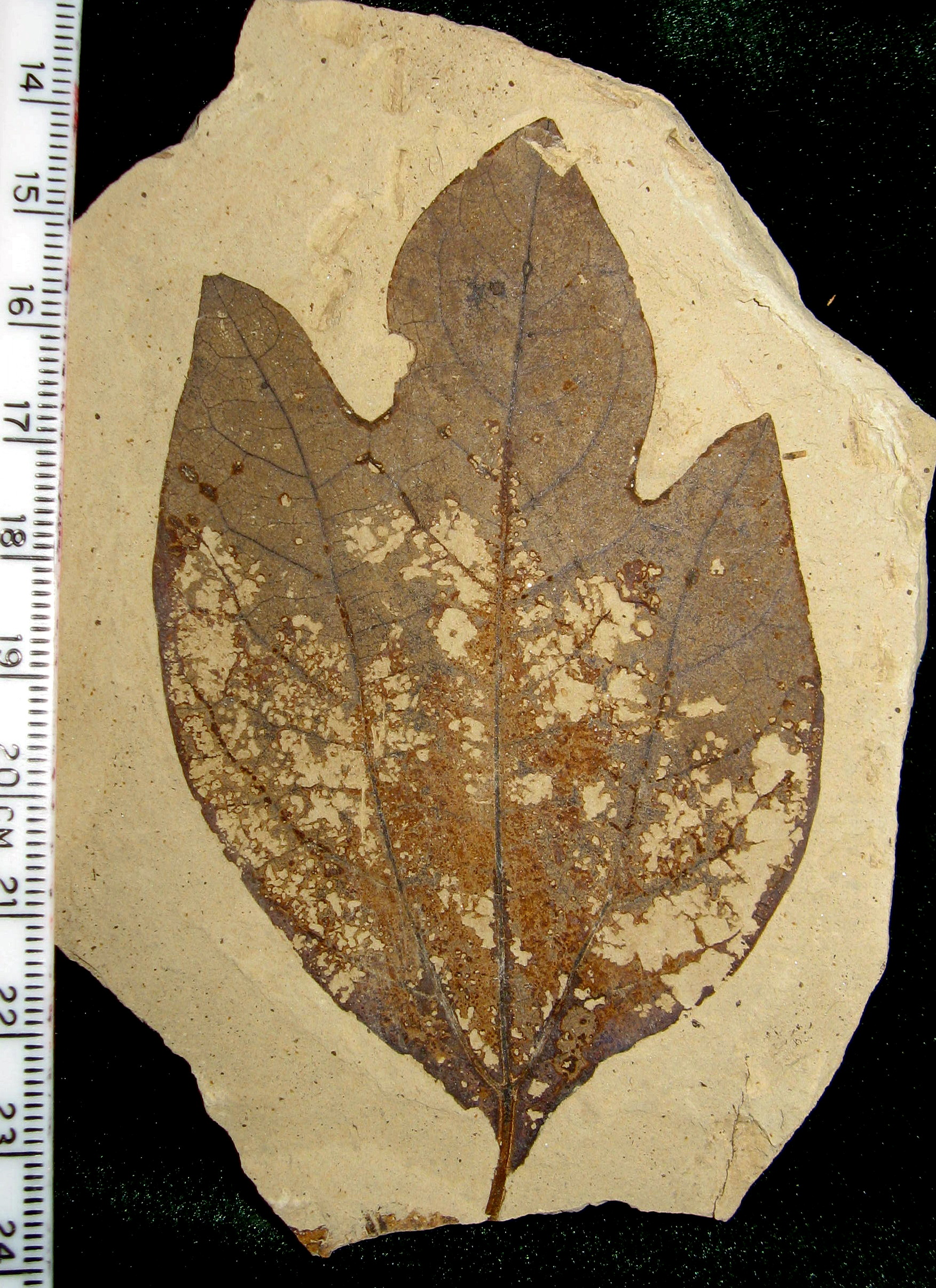
  - Fossilized leaf of the Eocene sassafras Sassafras hesperia
    †Sassafras hesperia
  - †Sassafras thermale
- †Scalopoides
  - †Scalopoides isodens
- Scaphinotus
  - †Scaphinotus serus – type locality for species
- †Scaptolenopsis – type locality for genus
  - †Scaptolenopsis wilmattae – type locality for species
- Sceloporus
  - †Sceloporus undulatus
- †Scenopagus
  - †Scenopagus edenensis
  - †Scenopagus priscus
- †Schaubeumys
  - †Schaubeumys clivosus
  - †Schaubeumys galbreathi
- †Schmaltzia
  - †Schmaltzia vexans
- †Sciabregma – type locality for genus
  - †Sciabregma rugosa – type locality for species
  - †Sciabregma tenuicornis – type locality for species
- Sciara
  - †Sciara dormitans – type locality for species
  - †Sciara florissantensis – type locality for species
  - †Sciara requieta – type locality for species
  - †Sciara sopora – type locality for species
- Sciomyza
  - †Sciomyza florissantensis – type locality for species
  - †Sciomyza manca
- †Sciophila
  - †Sciophila mirandula – type locality for species
- †Sciuravus
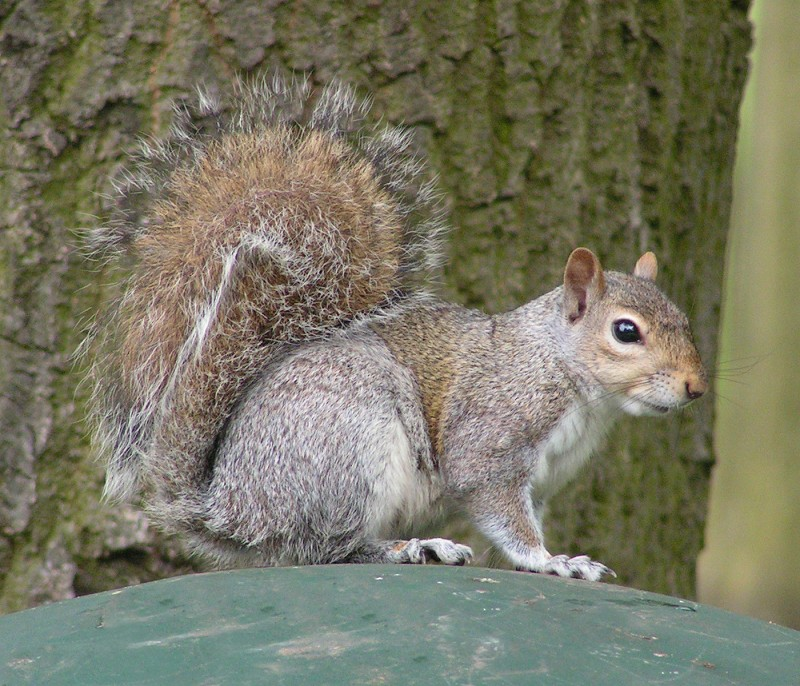
- A living Sciurus squirrel
  Sciurus
- Scolytus
  - †Scolytus piceae
- †Scoparidea – type locality for genus
  - †Scoparidea nebulosa – type locality for species
- †Scottimus
  - †Scottimus ambiguus
- †Scyphophorus
  - †Scyphophorus fossionis – type locality for species
  - †Scyphophorus laevis – type locality for species
  - †Scyphophorus tertiarius – type locality for species
- †Scythropus
  - †Scythropus somniculosus – type locality for species
- †Segestria
  - †Segestria scudderi – type locality for species
  - †Segestria secessa
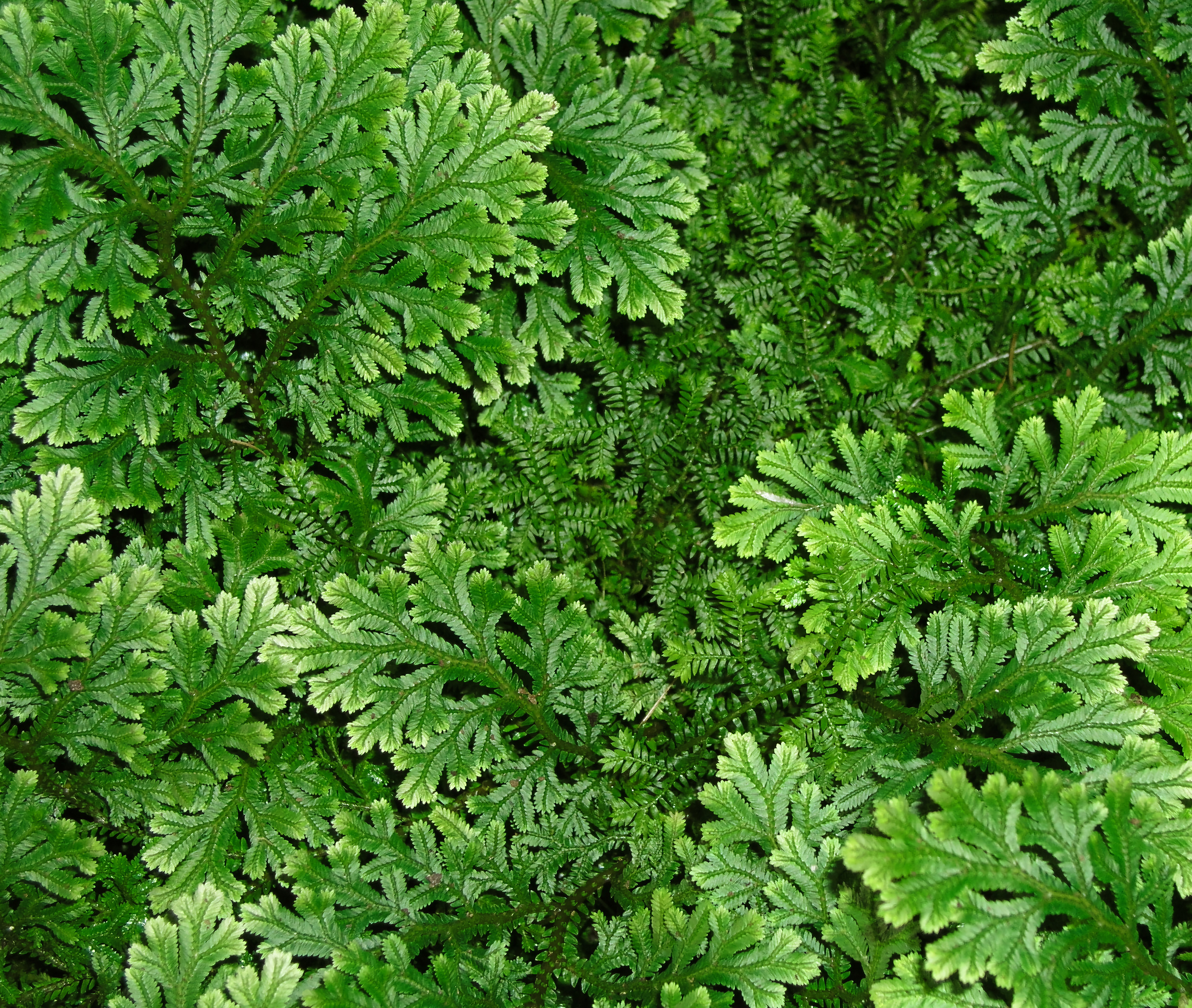
- A living Selaginella, or spikemoss
  †Selaginella
  - †Selaginella berthoudi
- †Selandria
  - †Selandria sapindi – type locality for species
- †Semanotus
  - †Semanotus puncticollis – type locality for species
- †Senoprosopis
  - †Senoprosopis antiquus – type locality for species
  - †Senoprosopis borealis – type locality for species
  - †Senoprosopis eureka – type locality for species
  - †Senoprosopis romeri – type locality for species
- Sequoia
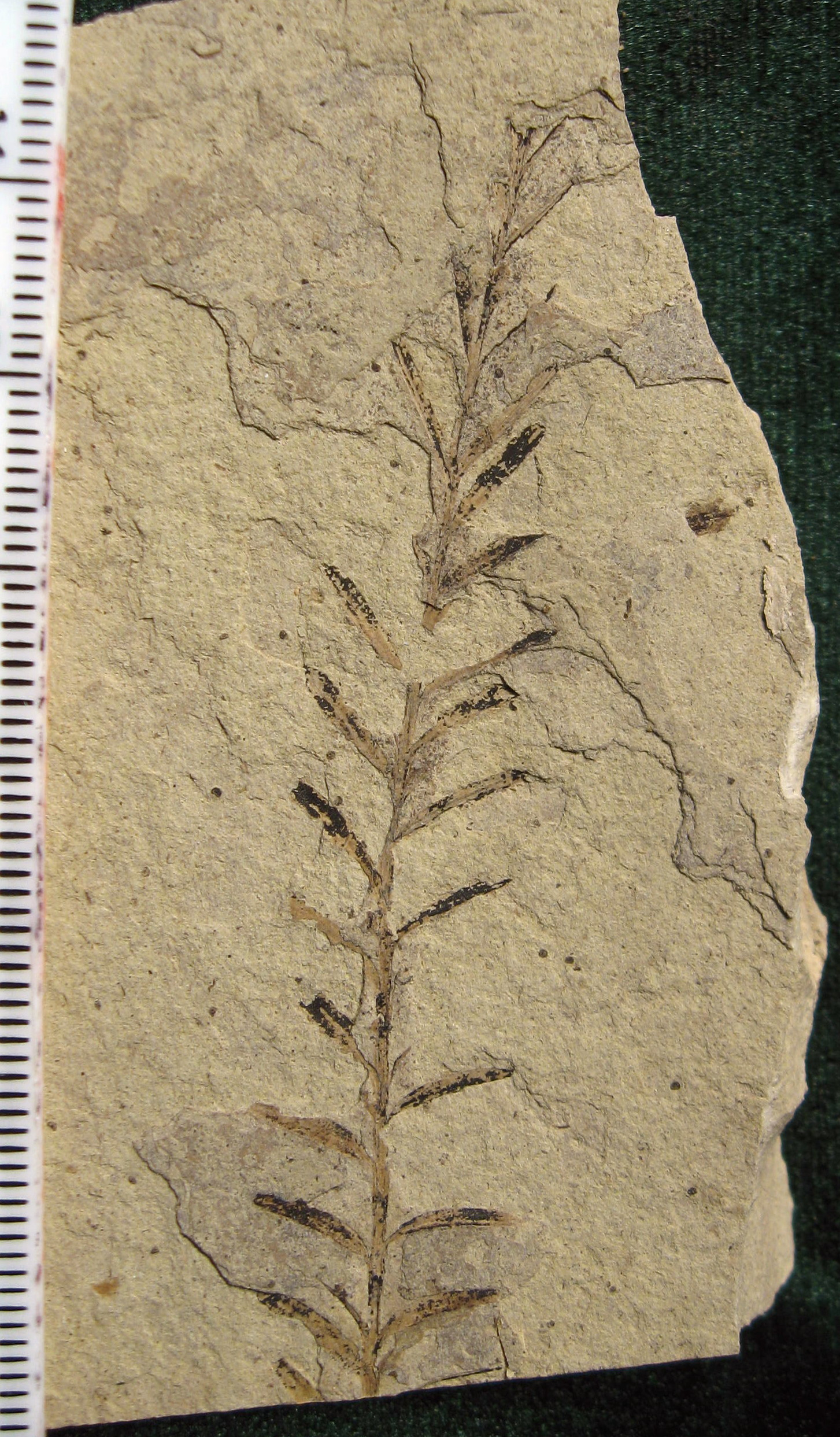
  - Fossilized branch fragment from a Sequoia affinis
    †Sequoia affinis
- Serica
  - †Serica antediluviana – type locality for species
  - †Serica cockerelli – type locality for species
- †Sespia
  - †Sespia nitida
- †Setodes
  - †Setodes abbreviata – type locality for species
  - †Setodes portionalis – type locality for species
- †Sialia
- †Sibinia
  - †Sibinia whitneyi – type locality for species
- †Sifrhippus
  - †Sifrhippus grangeri
- †Sigaretta
  - †Sigaretta florissantella – type locality for species
- Sigmodon
  - †Sigmodon curtisi
  - †Sigmodon minor
- †Silpha
  - †Silpha beutenmuelleri – type locality for species
  - †Silpha colorata – type locality for species
- †Silvius
  - †Silvius merychippi – type locality for species
- Simplocaria
  - †Simplocaria tessellata
- †Simpsonlemur
  - †Simpsonlemur jepseni
- †Simpsonodus
  - †Simpsonodus chacensis
- †Sinclairella
  - †Sinclairella dakotensis
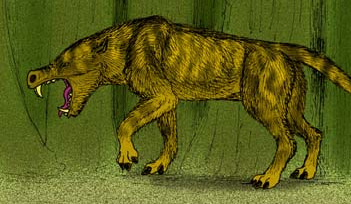
- Life restoration of the Paleocene mesonychid mammal Sinonyx (top)
  †Sinonyx – or unidentified comparable form
- †Siphlurites – type locality for genus
  - †Siphlurites explanatus – type locality for species
- †Siphonophoroides – type locality for genus
  - †Siphonophoroides antiqua – type locality for species
  - †Siphonophoroides gillettei – type locality for species
  - †Siphonophoroides lassa – type locality for species
  - †Siphonophoroides pennatus – type locality for species
  - †Siphonophoroides simplex – type locality for species
- Sitona
  - †Sitona exitiorum – type locality for species
  - †Sitona paginarum
- †Sitones
  - †Sitones exitiorum
- Sitta
  - †Sitta carolinensis
- †Smicrorhynchus
  - †Smicrorhynchus macgeei
- †Smilax
  - †Smilax labidurommae
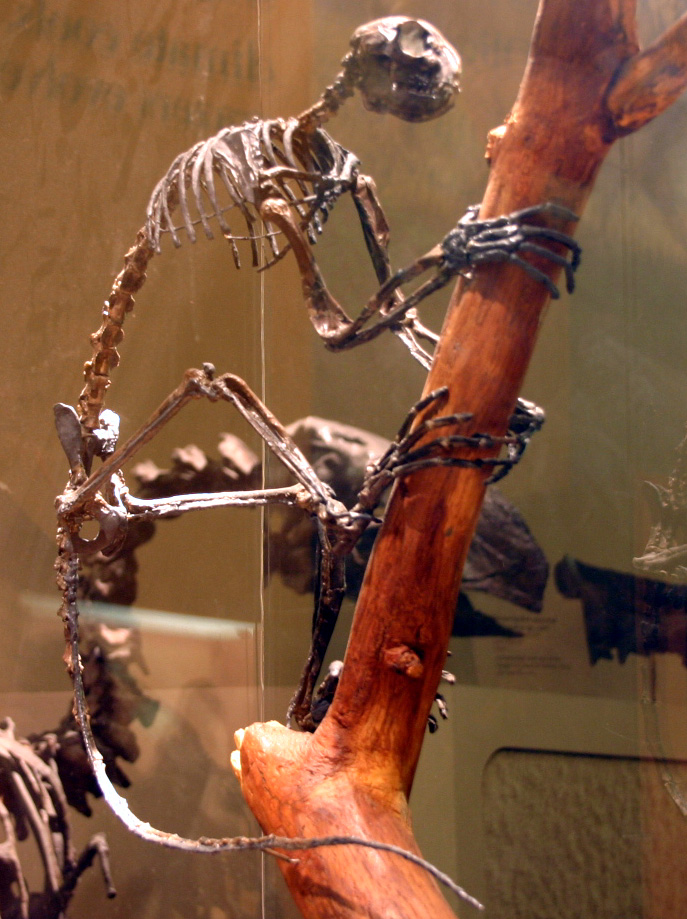
- Mounted fossilized skeleton of the Eocene primate Smilodectes
  †Smilodectes
  - †Smilodectes gracilis
  - †Smilodectes mcgrewi
- †Solenopsites – type locality for genus
  - †Solenopsites minutus – type locality for species
- Sonoma
  - †Sonoma margemina
- Sorex
  - †Sorex arcticus
  - †Sorex hoyi
- †Sparganium
  - †Sparganium antiquum
- Spea
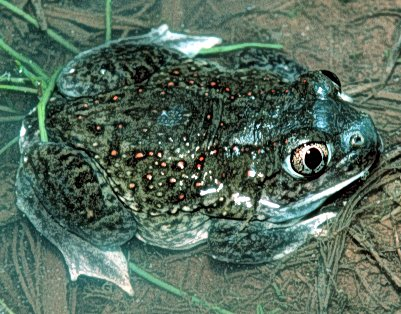
  - A living Spea bombifrons, or plains spadefoot toad
    †Spea bombifrons
- †Spermophagus
  - †Spermophagus pluto – type locality for species
  - †Spermophagus vivificatus – type locality for species
- Spermophilus
  - †Spermophilus elegans – or unidentified comparable form
  - †Spermophilus lateralis
  - †Spermophilus richardsonii
  - †Spermophilus tridecemlineatus
- †Sphegina
  - †Sphegina obscura – type locality for species
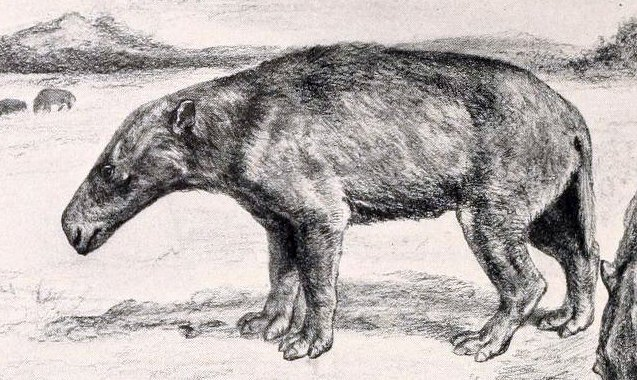
- Life restoration of the Eocene brontothere mammal Sphenocoelus
  †Sphenocoelus
  - †Sphenocoelus uintensis
- †Spiladomyia – type locality for genus
  - †Spiladomyia simplex – type locality for species
- †Spiladopygia
  - †Spiladopygia exsulata – type locality for species
  - †Spiladopygia mortalis – type locality for species
- Spilogale
  - †Spilogale putorius
- †Spiniphora
  - †Spiniphora cockerelli – type locality for species
- Spizella
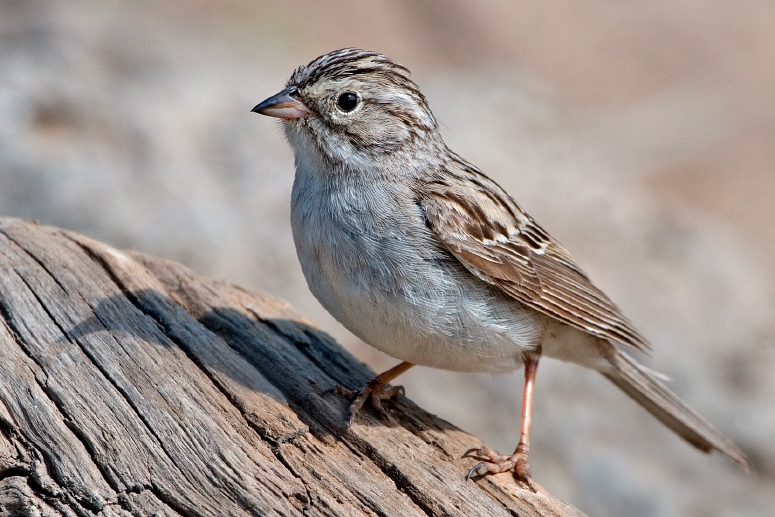
  - A living Spizella breweri, or Brewer's sparrow
    †Spizella breweri
- †Spodotribus – type locality for genus
  - †Spodotribus terrulentus – type locality for species
- †Staphylea
  - †Staphylea acuminata
  - †Staphylea minutidens
- Staphylinus
  - †Staphylinus lesleyi
  - †Staphylinus vetulus – type locality for species
  - †Staphylinus vulcan – type locality for species
- †Steganus – type locality for genus
  - †Steganus barrandei – type locality for species
- †Stenoechinus
  - †Stenoechinus tantalus
- †Stenogomphus – type locality for genus
  - †Stenogomphus carletoni – type locality for species
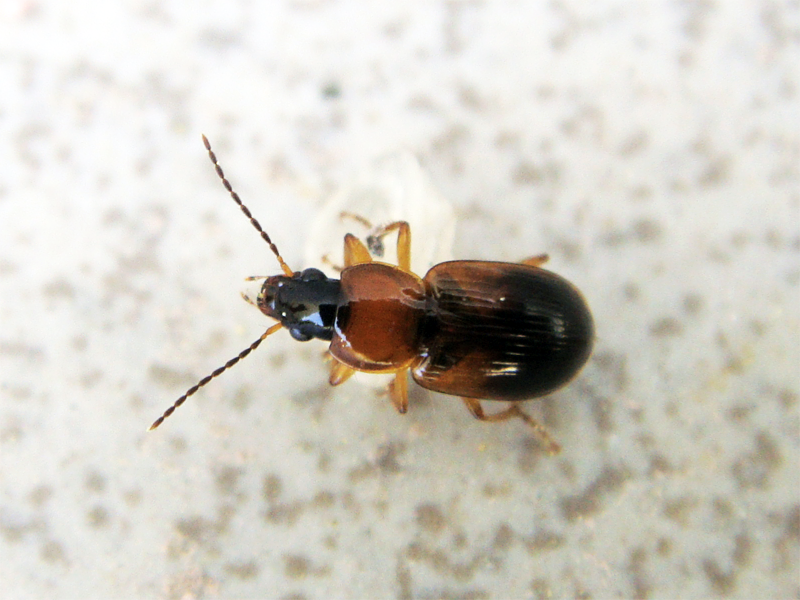
- A living Stenolophus ground beetle
  †Stenolophus
  - †Stenolophus religatus – type locality for species
- †Stenopamera – type locality for genus
  - †Stenopamera subterrea – type locality for species
  - †Stenopamera tenebrosa – type locality for species
- †Stenosphenus
  - †Stenosphenus pristinus – type locality for species
- †Stenovelia – type locality for genus
  - †Stenovelia nigra – type locality for species
- Stenus
  - †Stenus morsei – type locality for species
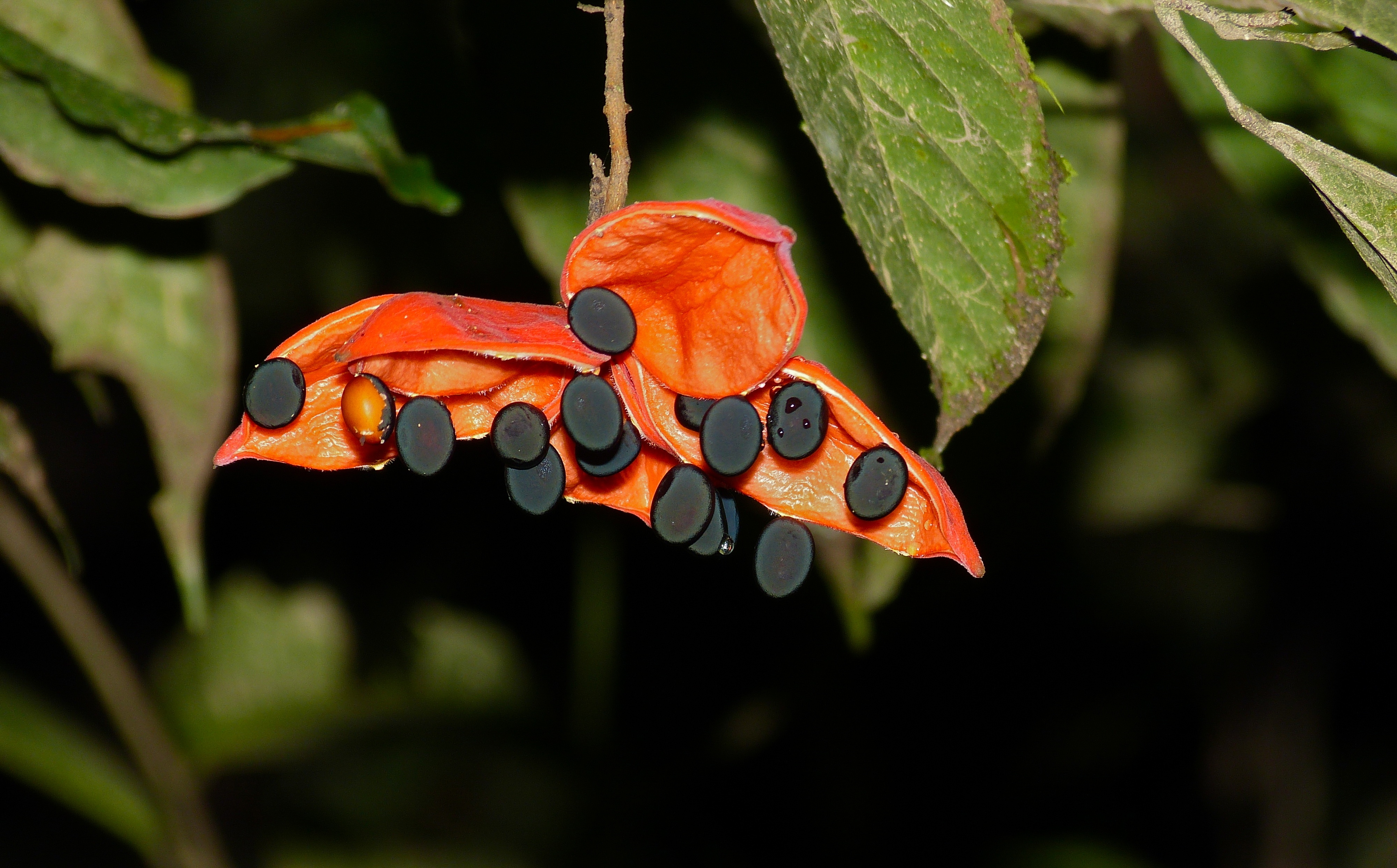
- Ripe fruit capsule and seeds of a living Sterculia, or tropical chestnut
  Sterculia
  - †Sterculia rigida
- †Sterictiphora
  - †Sterictiphora konowi – type locality for species
- †Stibarus
  - †Stibarus obtusilobus
  - †Stibarus quadricuspis
- Stilbus
  - †Stilbus pallidus
- †Stipa
  - †Stipa florissanti
- †Stolopsyche – type locality for genus
  - †Stolopsyche libytheoides – type locality for species
- †Strategus
  - †Strategus cessatus – type locality for species
- †Stratimus
  - †Stratimus strobeli
- †Striaderes – type locality for genus
  - †Striaderes conradi – type locality for species
- †Strigorhysis
  - †Strigorhysis huerfanensis – type locality for species
- †Stygiochelys
  - †Stygiochelys estesi
- †Stylinodon
  - †Stylinodon mirus
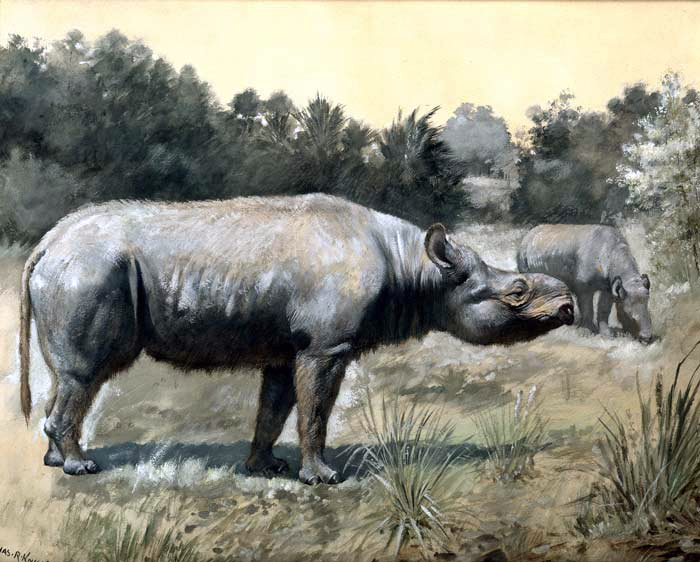
- Life restoration of the Eocene-Oligocene cow-sized rhinoceros Subhyracodon. Charles R. Knight (1890s).
  †Subhyracodon
  - †Subhyracodon mitis – type locality for species
  - †Subhyracodon occidentalis
- †Submeryceros
  - †Submeryceros minor
- Sylvilagus
  - †Sylvilagus audubonii
- †Symphoromyia
  - †Symphoromyia subtrita – type locality for species
- †Synchroa
  - †Synchroa quiescens – type locality for species
- †Syntomostylus
  - †Syntomostylus rudis
- Syrphus
  - †Syrphus aphidopsidis – type locality for species
  - †Syrphus carpenteri – type locality for species
  - †Syrphus eocenicus – type locality for species
  - †Syrphus hendersoni – type locality for species
  - †Syrphus lithaphidis – type locality for species
  - †Syrphus petrographicus – type locality for species
  - †Syrphus platychiralis – type locality for species
  - †Syrphus willistoni – type locality for species
- †Systena
  - †Systena florissantensis – type locality for species

== T ==
- †Tabanus
  - †Tabanus hipparionis – type locality for species
  - †Tabanus parahippi – type locality for species
- Tachinus
  - †Tachinus angustatus
  - †Tachinus elongatus
  - †Tachinus fimbriatus
  - †Tachinus schwarzi
  - †Tachinus sommatus – type locality for species
- Tachycineta
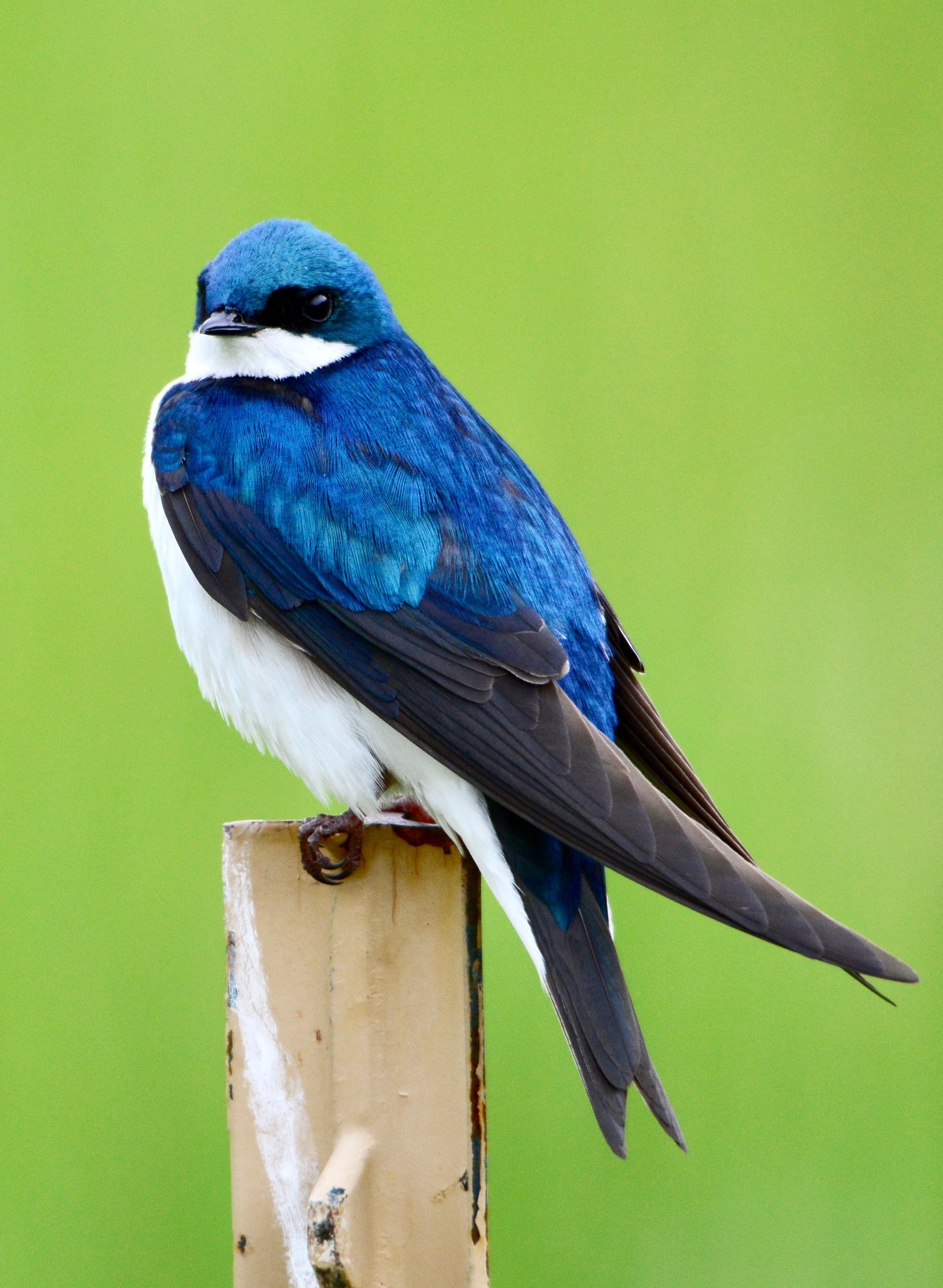
  - A living Tachycineta bicolor, or tree swallow
    †Tachycineta bicolor
- †Tachypeza
  - †Tachypeza primitiva – type locality for species
- Tachyporus
  - †Tachyporus annosus – type locality for species
  - †Tachyporus nimbicola
- †Tachys
  - †Tachys haywardi – type locality for species
- †Taeniopodites – type locality for genus
  - †Taeniopodites pardalis – type locality for species
- †Taeniurites – type locality for genus
  - †Taeniurites fortis – type locality for species
- †Tagalodes – type locality for genus
  - †Tagalodes inermis – type locality for species
- †Talpavus
- Tamiasciurus
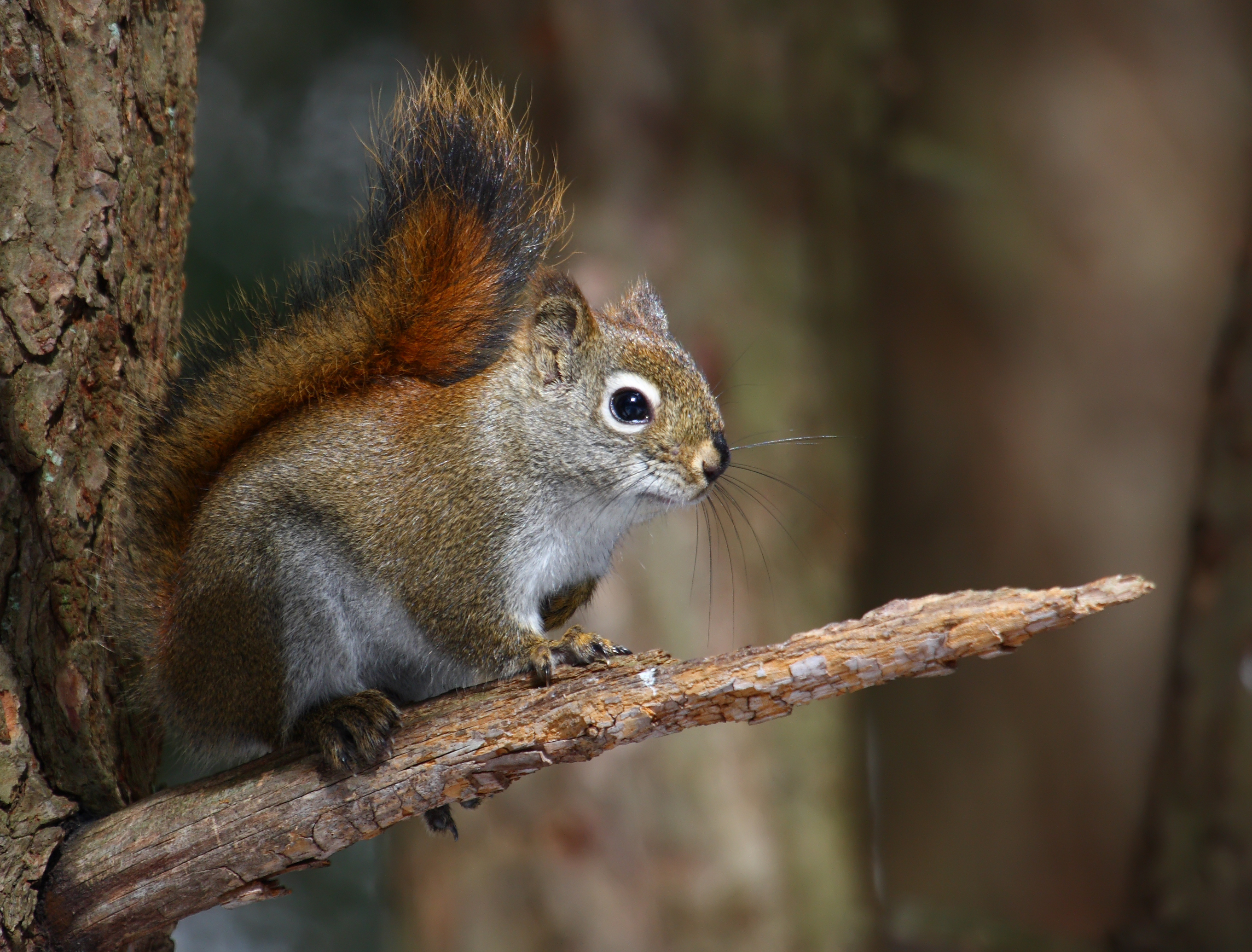
  - A living Tamiasciurus hudsonicus, or American red squirrel
    †Tamiasciurus hudsonicus
- Tanysphyrus
  - †Tanysphyrus lemnae
- †Taphacris – type locality for genus
  - †Taphacris bittaciformis – type locality for species
  - †Taphacris reliquata – type locality for species
- †Tapholyda
  - †Tapholyda caplani – type locality for species
- Tapirus
  - †Tapirus haysii
- †Taracticus
  - †Taracticus contusus – type locality for species
  - †Taracticus hypogaeus – type locality for species
  - †Taracticus renovatus – type locality for species
- Taxidea
  - †Taxidea taxus
- †Teilhardina
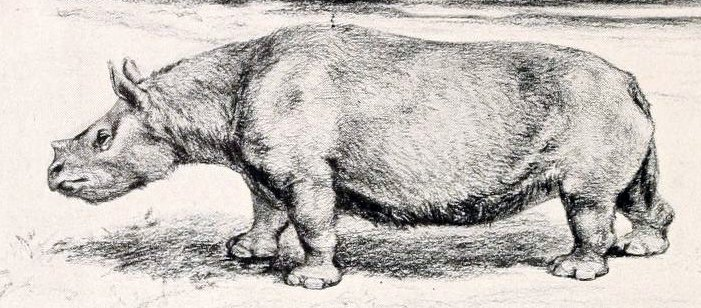
- Restoration of the Miocene-Pliocene rhinoceros Teleoceras
  †Teleoceras
  - †Teleoceras americanum – type locality for species
  - †Teleoceras hicksi
  - †Teleoceras medicornutum
- †Teleocoris – type locality for genus
  - †Teleocoris pothetias – type locality for species
- †Teleoschistus
  - †Teleoschistus placatus – type locality for species
  - †Teleoschistus rigoratus – type locality for species
- †Tenebrionites
  - †Tenebrionites alatus – type locality for species
- †Tenebroides
  - †Tenebroides corrugata – type locality for species
- †Tenillus – type locality for genus
  - †Tenillus firmus – type locality for species
- †Tenor – type locality for genus
  - †Tenor speluncae – type locality for species
- †Tenthredella
  - †Tenthredella fenestralis – type locality for species
  - †Tenthredella oblita – type locality for species
  - †Tenthredella toddi – type locality for species
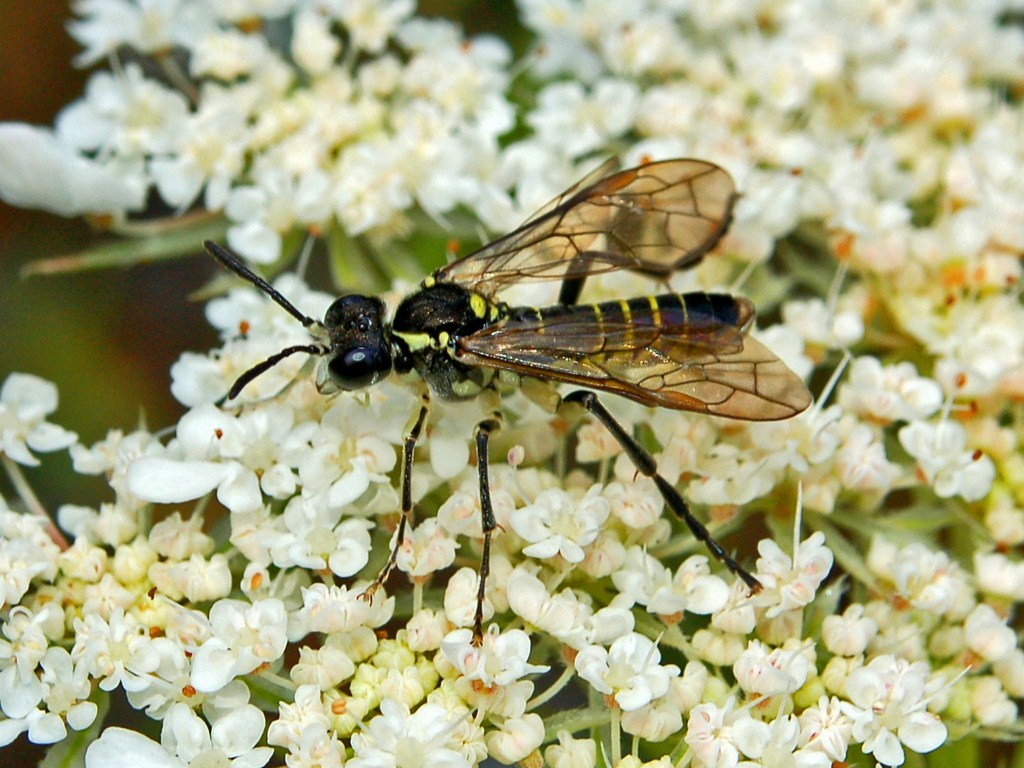
- A living Tenthredo sawfly
  †Tenthredo
  - †Tenthredo avia – type locality for species
  - †Tenthredo infossa – type locality for species
  - †Tenthredo saxorum – type locality for species
  - †Tenthredo submersa – type locality for species
- †Teretrum
  - †Teretrum primulum – type locality for species
- †Tethneus
  - †Tethneus guyoti
  - †Tethneus hentzi – type locality for species
  - †Tethneus obduratus – type locality for species
  - †Tethneus provectus – type locality for species
  - †Tethneus robustus – type locality for species
  - †Tethneus twenhofeli – type locality for species
- †Tetigonia
  - †Tetigonia obtecta – type locality for species
  - †Tetigonia priscotincta – type locality for species
- †Tetonius
  - †Tetonius matthewi
  - †Tetonius mckennai – type locality for species
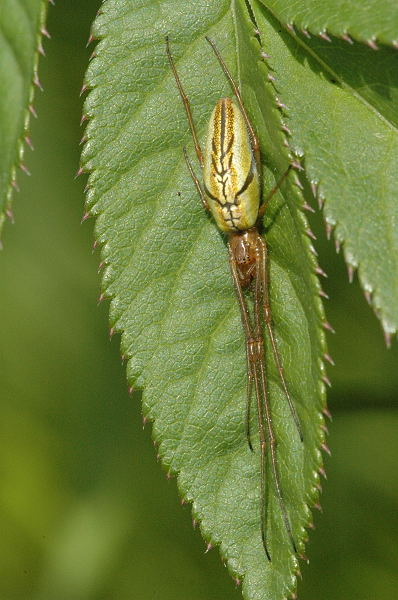
- A living Tetragnatha spider
  †Tetragnatha
  - †Tetragnatha tertiaria – type locality for species
- †Tetragoneura
  - †Tetragoneura peritula – type locality for species
- †Tetraonyx
  - †Tetraonyx minuscula – type locality for species
- †Tetraopes
  - †Tetraopes submersus – type locality for species
- †Tetrapus
  - †Tetrapus mayri – type locality for species
- Tetratoma
  - †Tetratoma concolor
- †Tettoraptor – type locality for genus
  - †Tettoraptor maculatus – type locality for species
- †Texasophis
  - †Texasophis fossilis
  - †Texasophis galbreathi – type locality for species
- †Texoceros
  - †Texoceros vaughani – type locality for species
- Thamnophis
  - †Thamnophis elegans
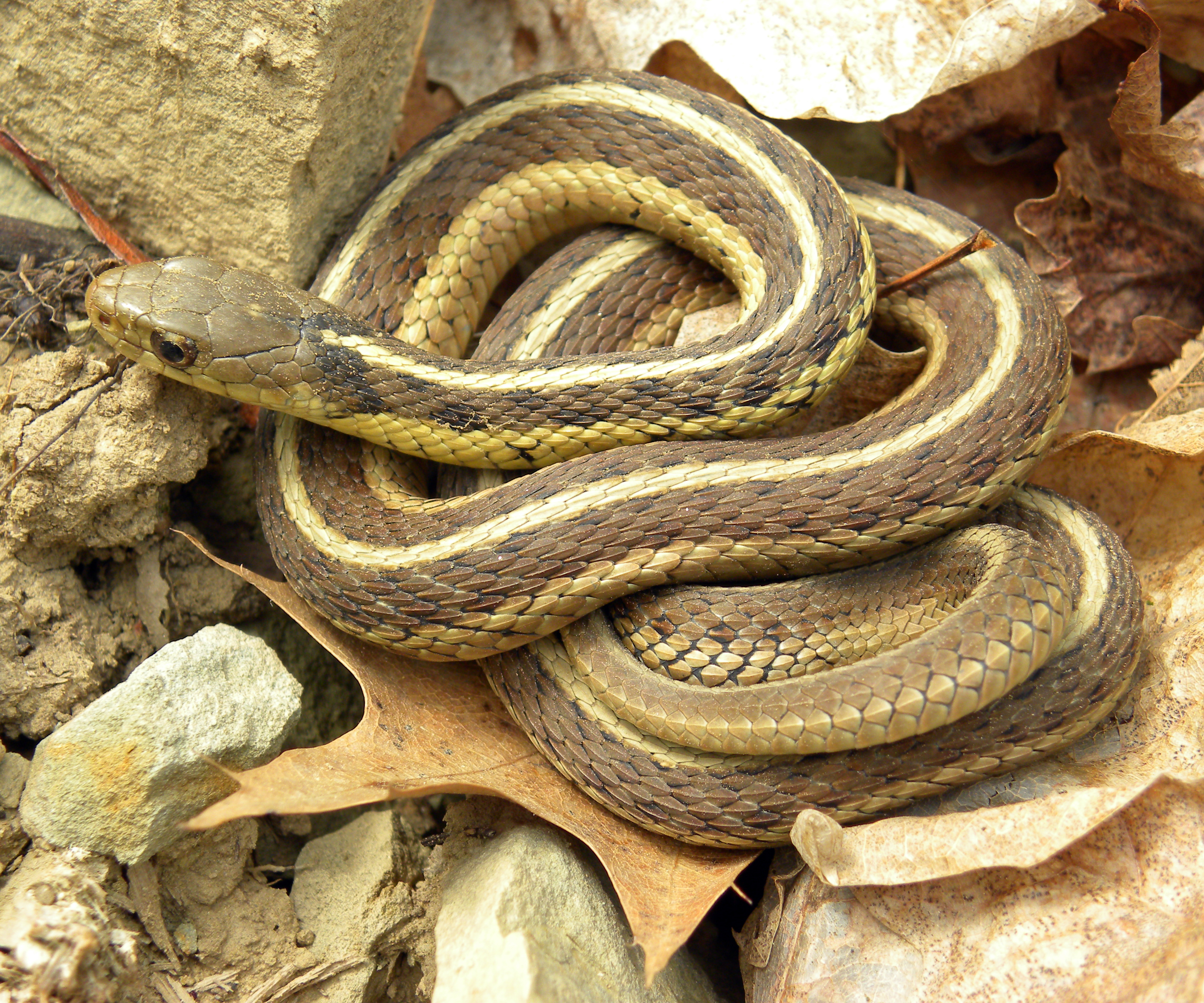
  - A living Thamnophis sirtalis, or common garter snake
    †Thamnophis sirtalis
- †Thamnotettix
  - †Thamnotettix eocenicus – type locality for species
  - †Thamnotettix fundi – type locality for species
  - †Thamnotettix packardi – type locality for species
- †Thanasimus
  - †Thanasimus florissantensis – type locality for species
- Thanatophilus
  - †Thanatophilus coloradensis
- †Thaumastocladius – type locality for genus
  - †Thaumastocladius simplex – type locality for species
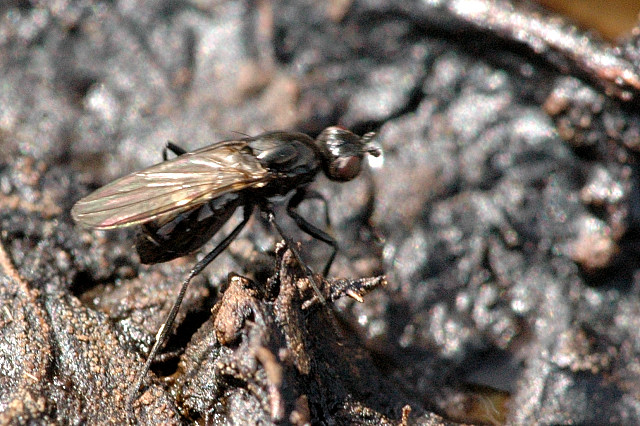
- A living Themira black scavenger fly
  †Themira
  - †Themira saxifica – type locality for species
- †Theronia
  - †Theronia wickhami – type locality for species
- †Thisbemys
  - †Thisbemys elachistos
  - †Thisbemys perditus – type locality for species
- †Thlibomenus – type locality for genus
  - †Thlibomenus limosus – type locality for species
  - †Thlibomenus macer – type locality for species
  - †Thlibomenus parvus – type locality for species
  - †Thlibomenus perennatus – type locality for species
  - †Thlibomenus petreus – type locality for species
- †Thlimmoschistus – type locality for genus
  - †Thlimmoschistus gravidatus – type locality for species
- †Thnetoschistus – type locality for genus
  - †Thnetoschistus revulsus – type locality for species
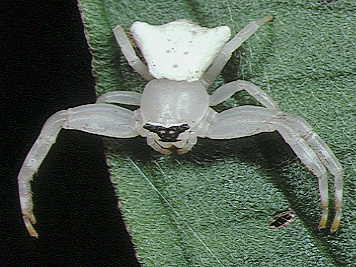
- A living Thomisus crab spider
  †Thomisus
  - †Thomisus defossus – type locality for species
  - †Thomisus disjunctus – type locality for species
  - †Thomisus resutus – type locality for species
- Thomomys
  - †Thomomys talpoides
- †Thouinia
  - †Thouinia straciata
- †Thryptacodon
  - †Thryptacodon antiquus
  - †Thryptacodon australis – type locality for species
- †Thuja
  - †Thuja interrupta
- †Thylacodon
  - †Thylacodon montanensis
  - †Thylacodon pusillus
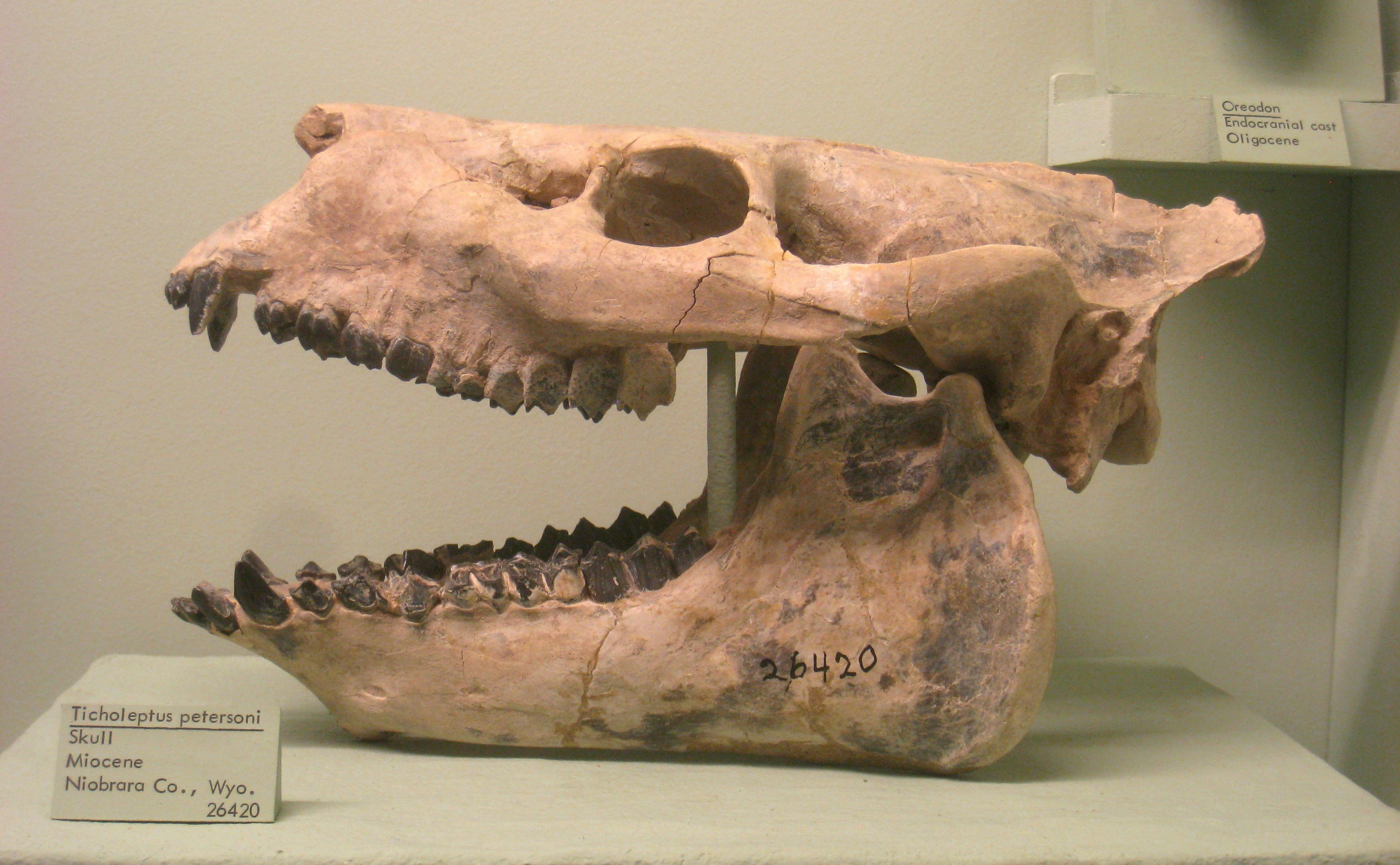
- Fossilized skull of the Miocene oreodont mammal Ticholeptus
  †Ticholeptus
- Tilia
  - †Tilia populifolia
- †Tillomys
  - †Tillomys senex – or unidentified comparable form
- †Tingis
  - †Tingis florissantensis – type locality for species
- †Tinodes – tentative report
  - †Tinodes paludigena – type locality for species
- Tipula – type locality for genus
  - †Tipula bilineata – type locality for species
  - †Tipula carolinae – type locality for species
  - †Tipula carpenteri – type locality for species
  - †Tipula clauda
  - †Tipula consumpta – type locality for species
  - †Tipula evanitura
  - †Tipula florissanta
  - †Tipula fmartinbrowni – type locality for species
  - †Tipula heilprini – type locality for species
  - †Tipula hepialina – type locality for species
  - †Tipula internecata
  - †Tipula lapillescens – type locality for species
  - †Tipula lethaea – type locality for species
  - †Tipula limi
  - †Tipula maclurei
  - †Tipula magnifica – type locality for species
  - †Tipula needhami – type locality for species
  - †Tipula paludis – type locality for species
  - †Tipula picta – type locality for species
  - †Tipula reliquiae – type locality for species
  - †Tipula revivificata – type locality for species
  - †Tipula rigens
  - †Tipula subterjacens – type locality for species
  - †Tipula tartari – type locality for species
  - †Tipula wilmatteae – type locality for species
- †Tipulidea
  - †Tipulidea distincta
- †Tiromerus – type locality for genus
  - †Tiromerus tabifluus – type locality for species
  - †Tiromerus torpefactus – type locality for species
- †Tiroschistus – type locality for genus
  - †Tiroschistus indurescens – type locality for species
- †Titanoeca
  - †Titanoeca ingenua – type locality for species
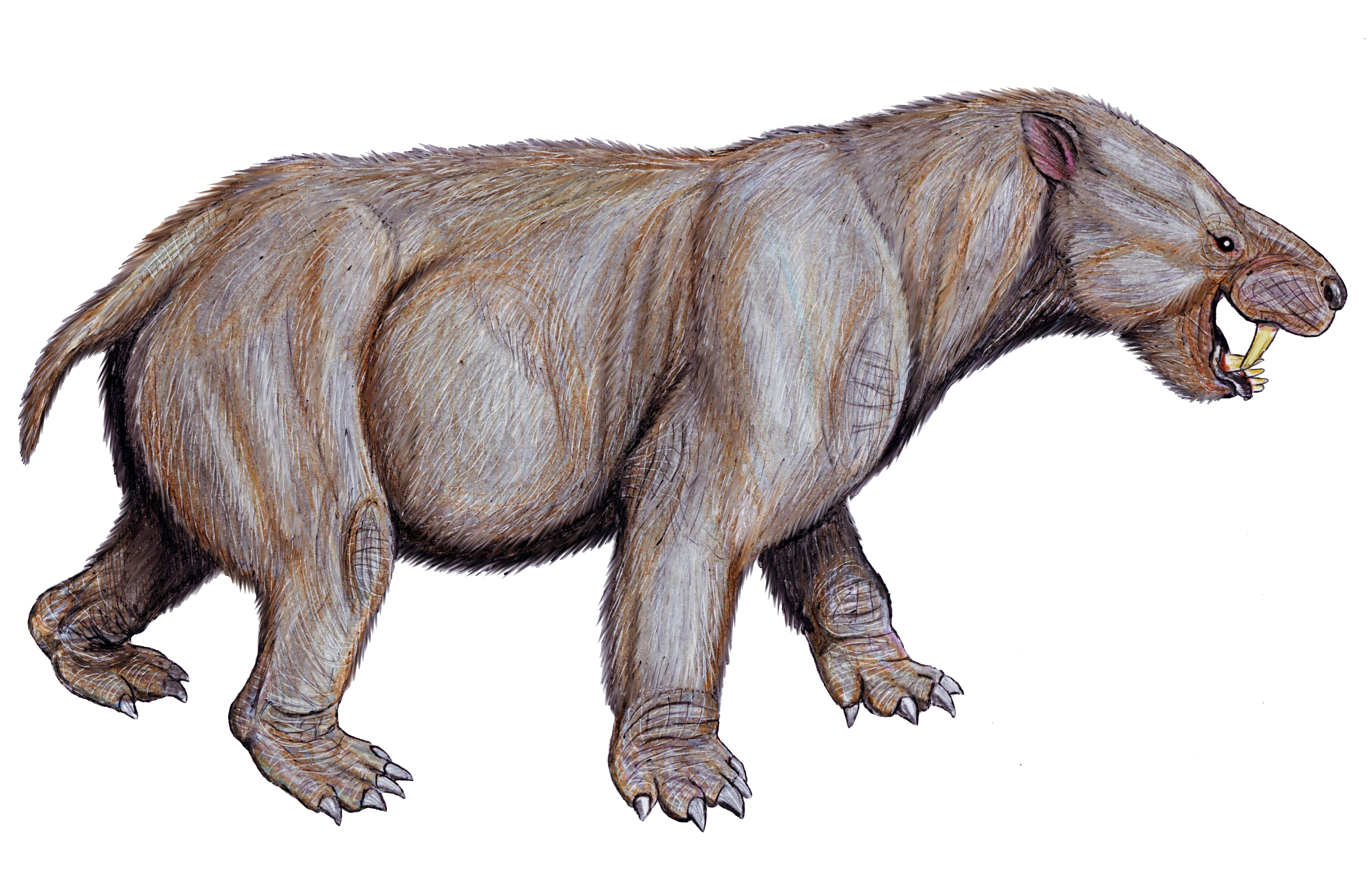
- Life restoration of the Paleocene pantodont mammal Titanoides
  †Titanoides
  - †Titanoides looki
  - †Titanoides primaevus
- †Tithonomyia
  - †Tithonomyia atra – type locality for species
- †Tomarctus
  - †Tomarctus brevirostris – type locality for species
- †Tomoxia
  - †Tomoxia inundata – type locality for species
- †Torreya
  - †Torreya geometrorum
- †Tortricites
  - †Tortricites destructus – type locality for species
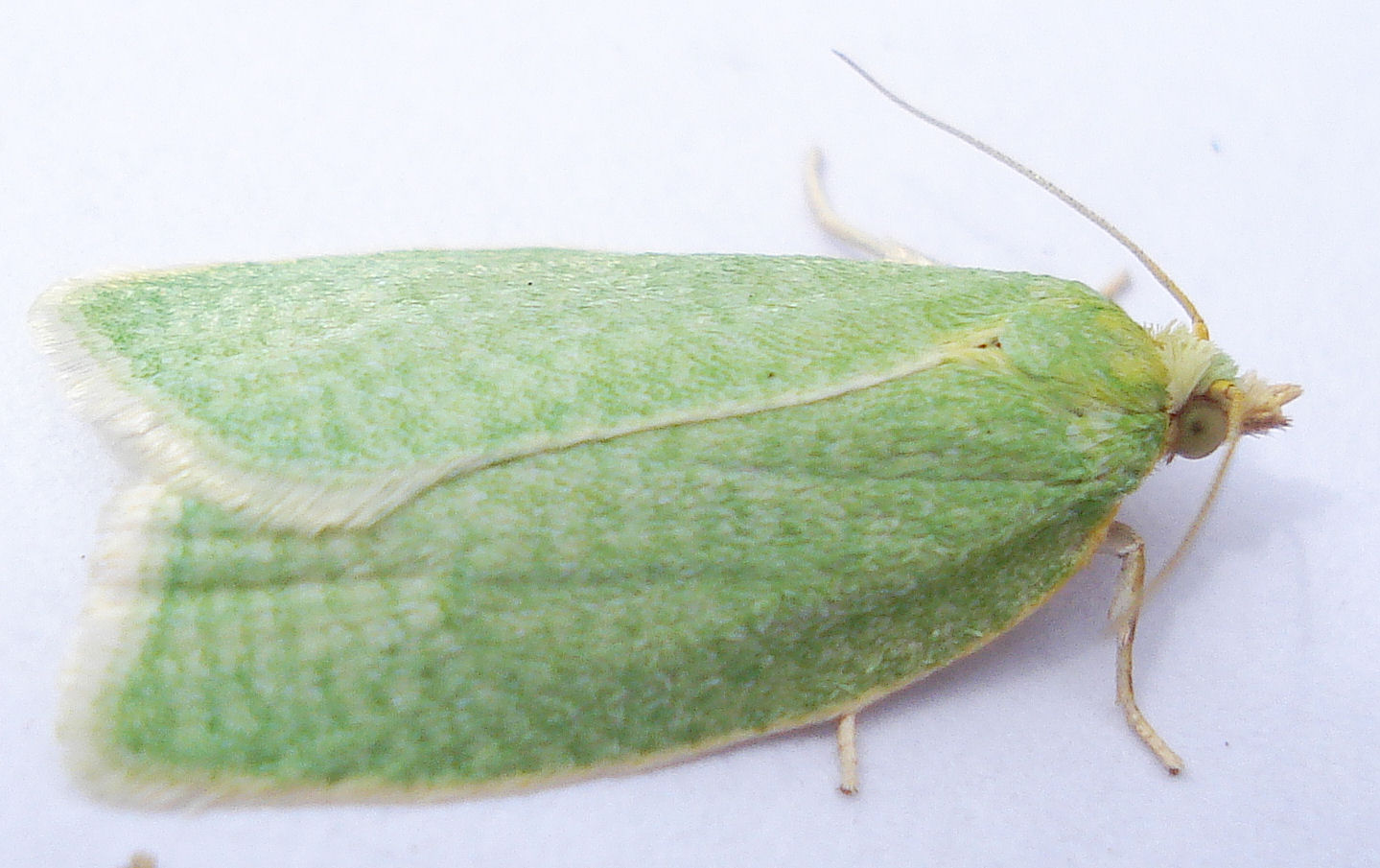
- A living Tortrix moth
  †Tortrix
  - †Tortrix florissantana – type locality for species
- †Torymus
  - †Torymus sackeni – type locality for species
- †Toxorhynchus
  - †Toxorhynchus arctus
  - †Toxorhynchus confectum – type locality for species
  - †Toxorhynchus corruptus – type locality for species
  - †Toxorhynchus florissantensis – type locality for species
  - †Toxorhynchus grandis – type locality for species
  - †Toxorhynchus minusculus – type locality for species
  - †Toxorhynchus oculatus – type locality for species
  - †Toxorhynchus pumilum
  - †Toxorhynchus refrenatum – type locality for species
  - †Toxorhynchus reventus – type locality for species
  - †Toxorhynchus scudderianum – type locality for species
- †Tracheliodes
  - †Tracheliodes mortuellus – type locality for species
- †Trapezonotus
  - †Trapezonotus exterminatus – type locality for species
  - †Trapezonotus stygialis – type locality for species
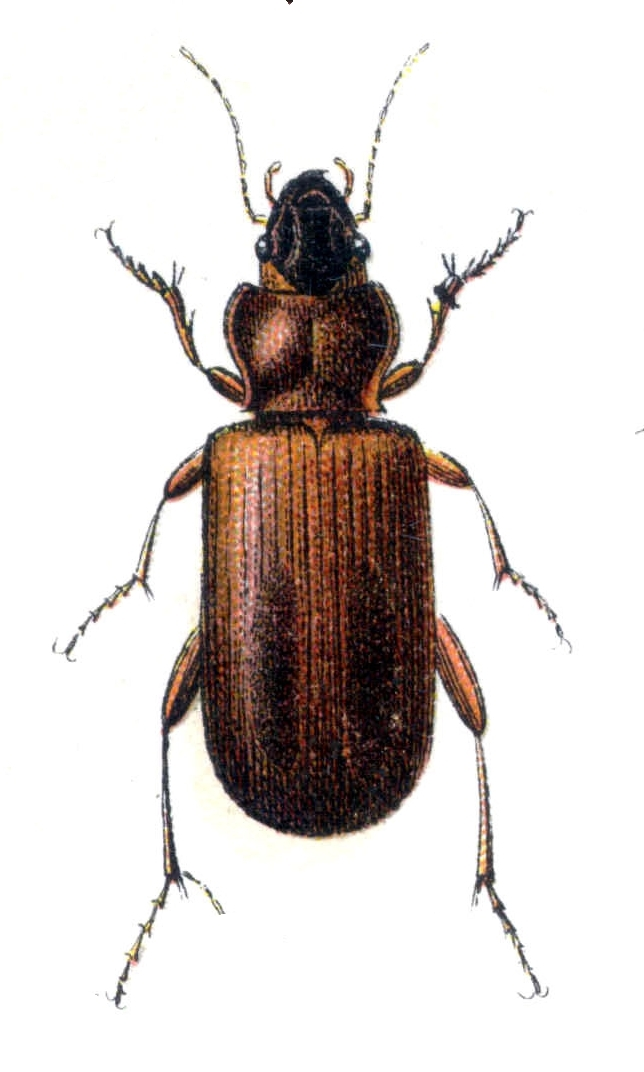
- Illustration of a living Trechus ground beetle
  Trechus
  - †Trechus fractus – type locality for species
- †Tribochrysa – type locality for genus
  - †Tribochrysa firmata – type locality for species
  - †Tribochrysa inequalis – type locality for species
- †Tricentes
  - †Tricentes subtrigonus
- †Trichilia
  - †Trichilia florissanti
- †Trichiosomites – type locality for genus
  - †Trichiosomites obliviosus – type locality for species
- †Triga
  - †Triga coeni – type locality for species
- †Trigonias
  - †Trigonias osborni – type locality for species
- †Trigonorhinus
  - †Trigonorhinus sordidus – type locality for species
- †Trigonoscuta
  - †Trigonoscuta inventa – type locality for species
- †Triplax
  - †Triplax diluviana – type locality for species
  - †Triplax materna – type locality for species
  - †Triplax petrefacta – type locality for species
  - †Triplax submersa – type locality for species
- †Triplopus
  - †Triplopus implicatus
- †Trirhabda
  - †Trirhabda majuscula – type locality for species
  - †Trirhabda megacephala – type locality for species
  - †Trirhabda sepulta
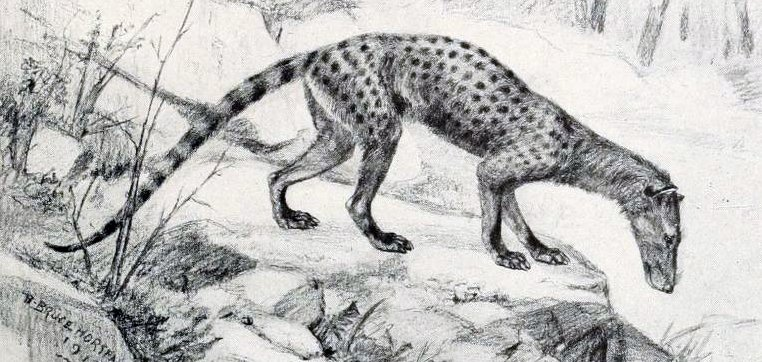
- Life restoration of the Eocene creodont mammal Tritemnodon
  †Tritemnodon
  - †Tritemnodon strenuus – or unidentified comparable form
- †Triumfetta
  - †Triumfetta ovata – type locality for species
- Trixagus
  - †Trixagus sericeus
- †Trixoscelis
  - †Trixoscelis patefacta – type locality for species
- †Trogosus
  - †Trogosus grangeri
- Trogoxylon
  - †Trogoxylon parallelopipedum
- †Trogus
  - †Trogus vetus – type locality for species
- †Tropideres
  - †Tropideres vastatus – type locality for species
- †Tropisternus
  - †Tropisternus limitatus – type locality for species
  - †Tropisternus vanus – type locality for species
- Trox
  - †Trox antiquus – type locality for species
- †Trypherus
  - †Trypherus aboriginalis – type locality for species
- †Tryphon
  - †Tryphon amasidis – type locality for species
  - †Tryphon cadaver – type locality for species
  - †Tryphon explanatum – type locality for species
  - †Tryphon florissantensis – type locality for species
  - †Tryphon lapideus – type locality for species
  - †Tryphon peregrinus – type locality for species
  - †Tryphon senex – type locality for species
- †Tychius
  - †Tychius evolatus
  - †Tychius ferox – type locality for species
  - †Tychius secretus – type locality for species
- †Tylecomnus
  - †Tylecomnus davisii – type locality for species
  - †Tylecomnus pimploides – type locality for species
- †Tylocomnus
  - †Tylocomnus creedensis – type locality for species
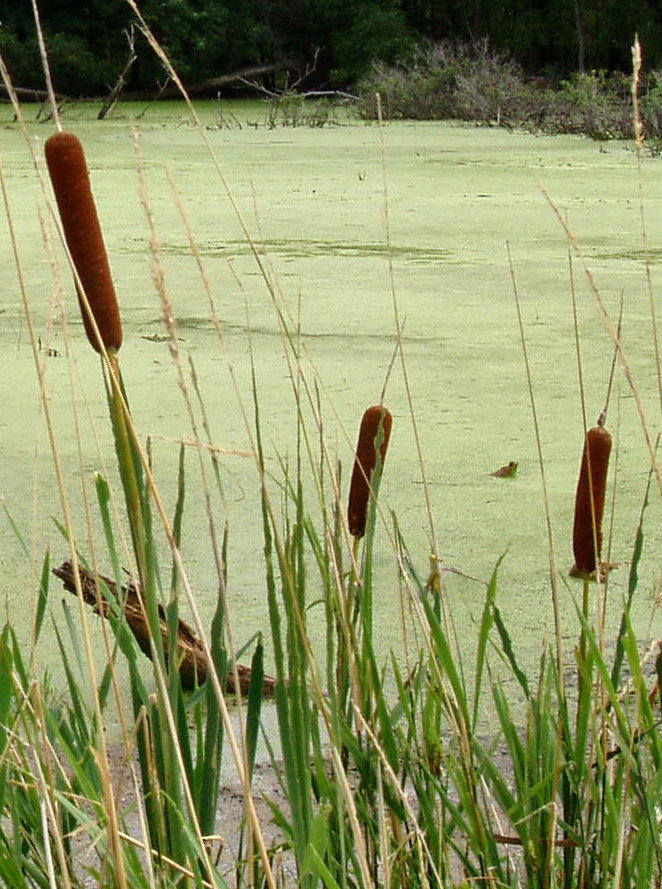
- Living Typha, or cattails
  Typha
  - †Typha lesquereuxi
- †Tyrbula
  - †Tyrbula russelli – type locality for species
  - †Tyrbula scudderi – type locality for species

== U ==
- †Ubiquitoxylon – type locality for genus
  - †Ubiquitoxylon raynoldsii – type locality for species
- †Uintacyon
  - †Uintacyon asodes
  - †Uintacyon massetericus – or unidentified comparable form
- †Uintanius
  - †Uintanius rutherfurdi
- †Uintascorpio – type locality for genus
  - †Uintascorpio halandrasorum – type locality for species
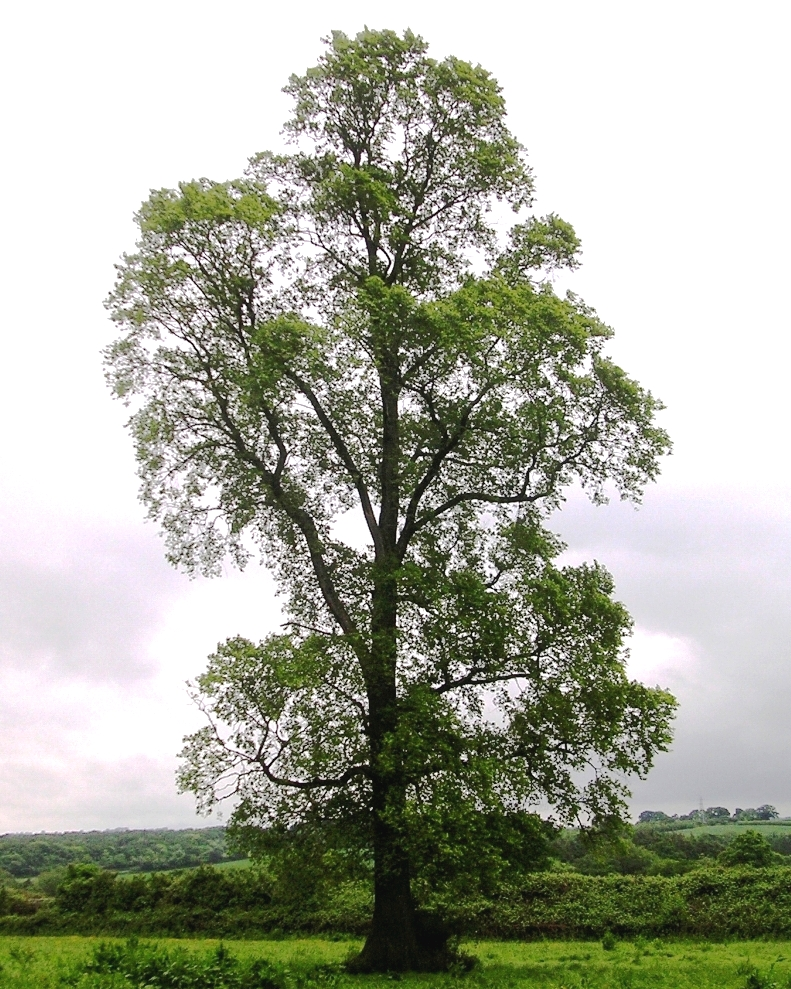
- A living Ulmus, or elm
  Ulmus
  - †Ulmus rhamnifolia
  - †Ulmus tenuinervis
- †Ulus
  - †Ulus minutus – type locality for species
- Urocyon
  - †Urocyon cinereoargenteus
- †Urolibellula – type locality for genus
  - †Urolibellula eocenica – type locality for species
- †Urortalis
  - †Urortalis caudatus – type locality for species
- †Urosigalphus
  - †Urosigalphus aeternus – type locality for species
- †Ursavus
  - †Ursavus pawniensis
- Ursus
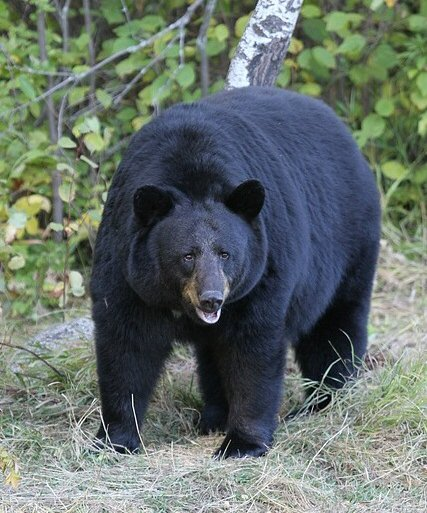
  - A living Ursus americanus, or American black bear
    †Ursus americanus
- †Ustatochoerus
  - †Ustatochoerus medius
- †Utemylus
  - †Utemylus latomius – type locality for species
  - †Utemylus serior

== V ==
- †Vanessa
  - †Vanessa amerindica – type locality for species
- †Vauquelinia
  - †Vauquelinia coloradensis
- †Verrallites – type locality for genus
  - †Verrallites cladurus – type locality for species
- †Viburnum
  - †Viburnum goldianum
  - †Viburnum solitarium
- †Vicia
- †Villa – type locality for genus
  - †Villa setosa – type locality for species
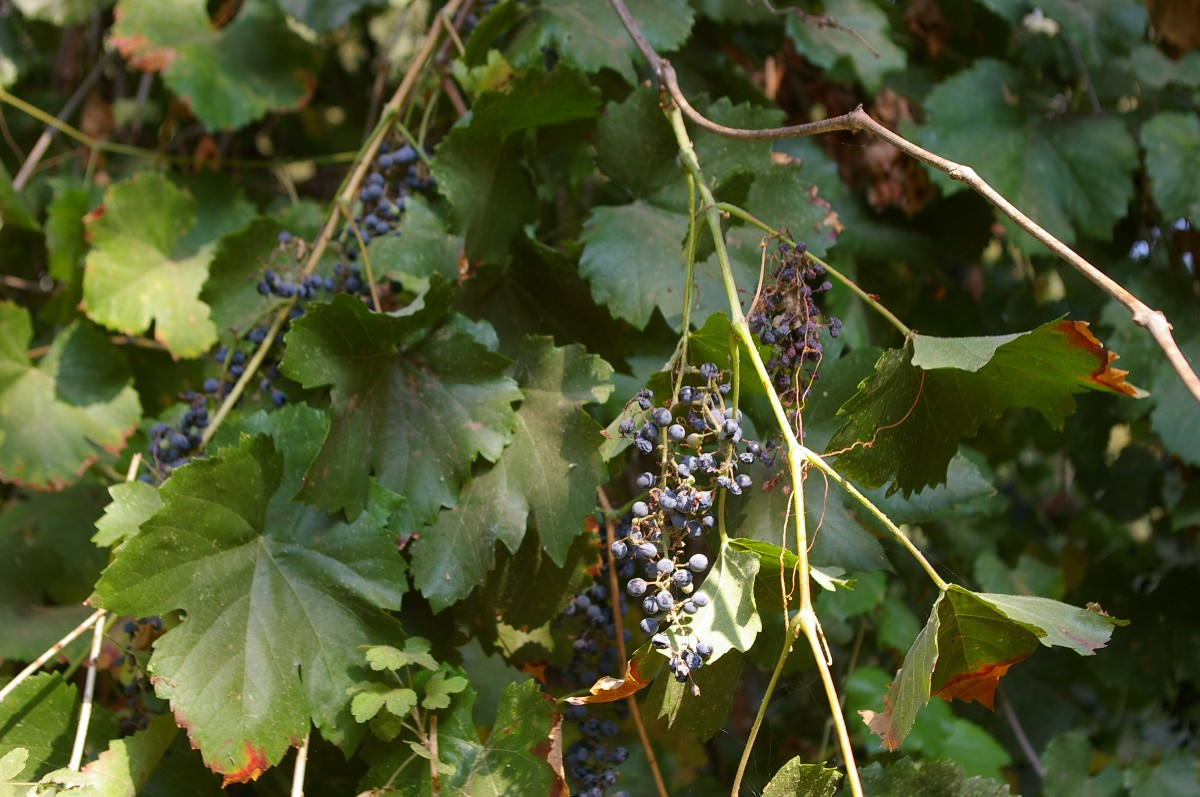
- Leaves and fruit of a living Vitis, or grapevine
  Vitis
  - †Vitis lobata
  - †Vitis olriki
- †Viverravus
  - †Viverravus acutus
  - †Viverravus gracilis
  - †Viverravus lutosus
  - †Viverravus minutus
  - †Viverravus politus – or unidentified comparable form
  - †Viverravus sicarius
- †Vrilletta
  - †Vrilletta monstrosa – type locality for species
  - †Vrilletta tenuistriata – type locality for species
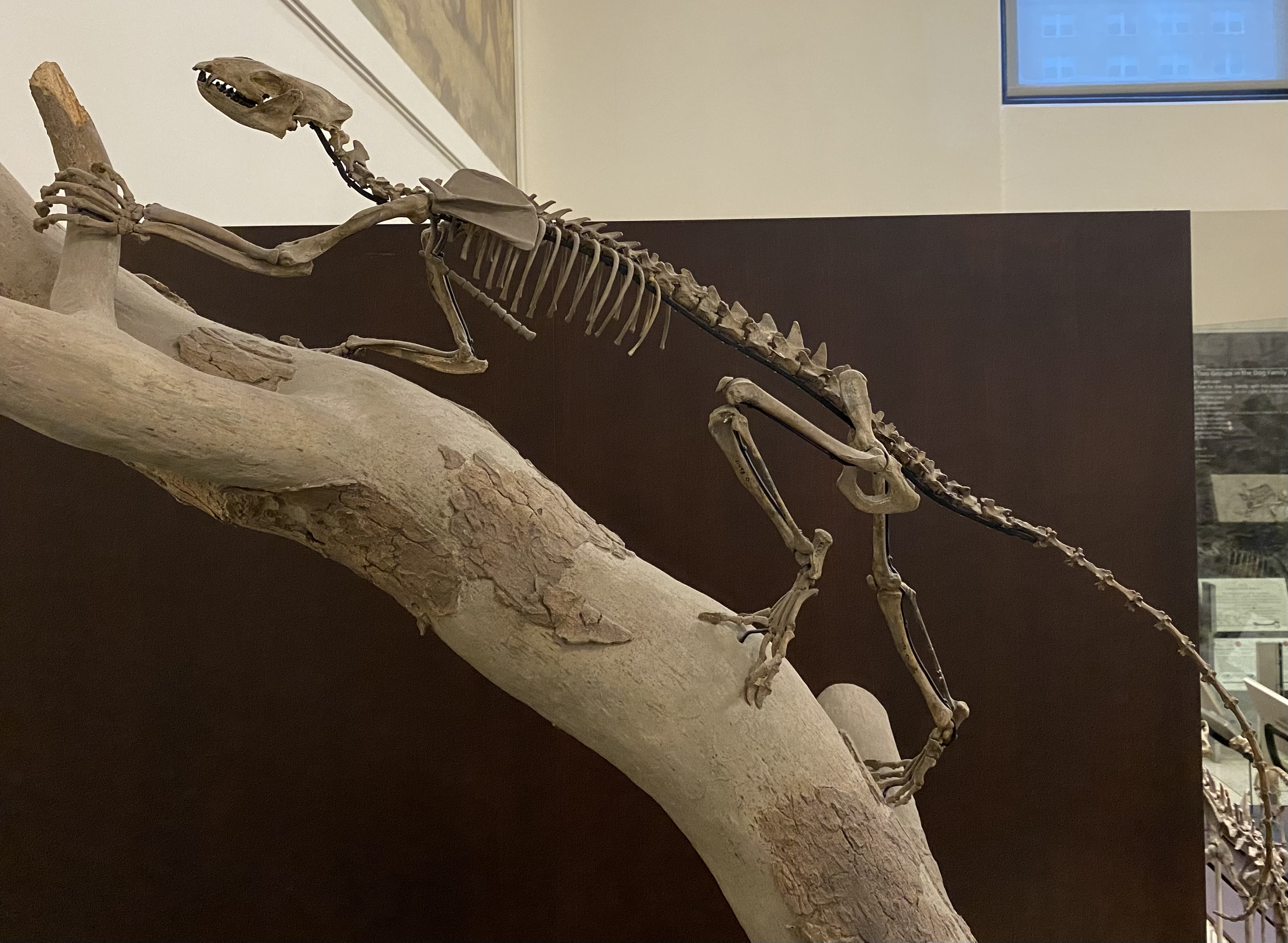
- Mounted fossilized skeleton of the Eocene mammal Vulpavus
  †Vulpavus
  - †Vulpavus australis – or unidentified comparable form
  - †Vulpavus canavus
- Vulpes
  - †Vulpes stenognathus
  - †Vulpes velox
  - †Vulpes vulpes

== W ==
- †Washakius
  - †Washakius izetti – or unidentified comparable form
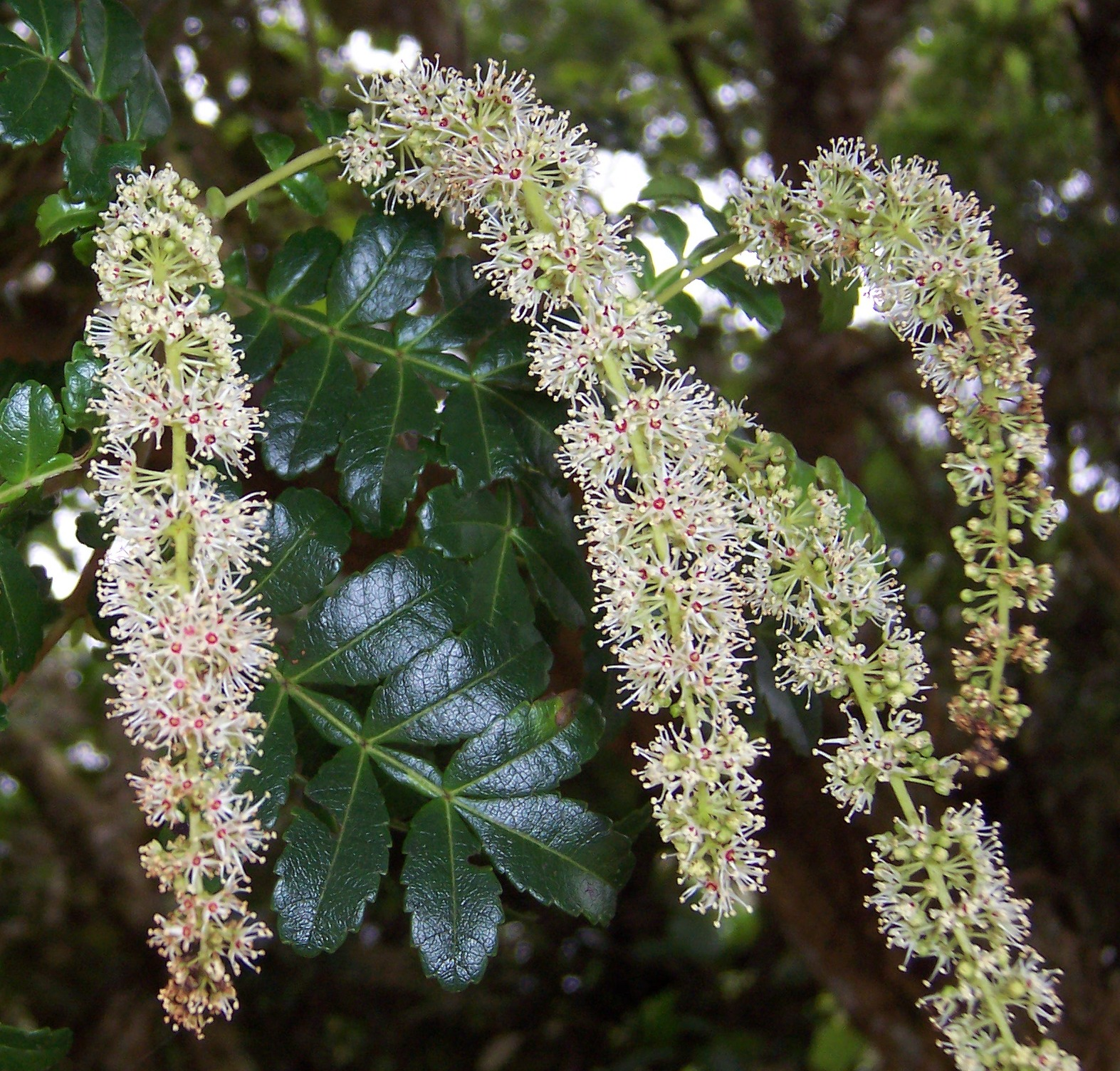
- Flowers of a living Weinmannia
  †Weinmannia
  - †Weinmannia phenacophylla
- †Wickia – type locality for genus
  - †Wickia brevirhinus – type locality for species
- †Wilsoneumys
  - †Wilsoneumys planidens
- †Wilsonosorex
  - †Wilsonosorex conulatus
- †Woodwardia
  - †Woodwardia arctica

== X ==
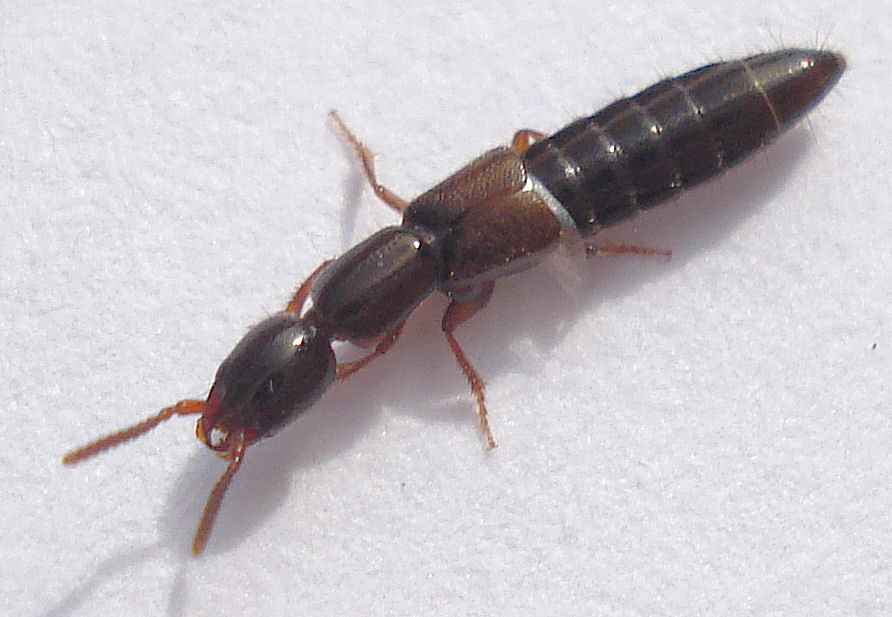
- A living Xantholinus rove beetle
  †Xantholinus
  - †Xantholinus tenebrarius – type locality for species
- †Xenacodon
  - †Xenacodon mutilatus – type locality for species
- †Xenicohippus
  - †Xenicohippus craspedotum
  - †Xenicohippus grangeri
  - †Xenicohippus osborni
- †Xenoberotha – type locality for genus
  - †Xenoberotha angustialata – type locality for species
- †Xestobium
  - †Xestobium alutaceum – type locality for species
- Xyela
  - †Xyela florissantensis – type locality for species
- Xyleborinus
  - †Xyleborinus saxesenii
- †Xyleborites – type locality for genus
  - †Xyleborites longipennis – type locality for species
- †Xylobiops
  - †Xylobiops lacustre – type locality for species
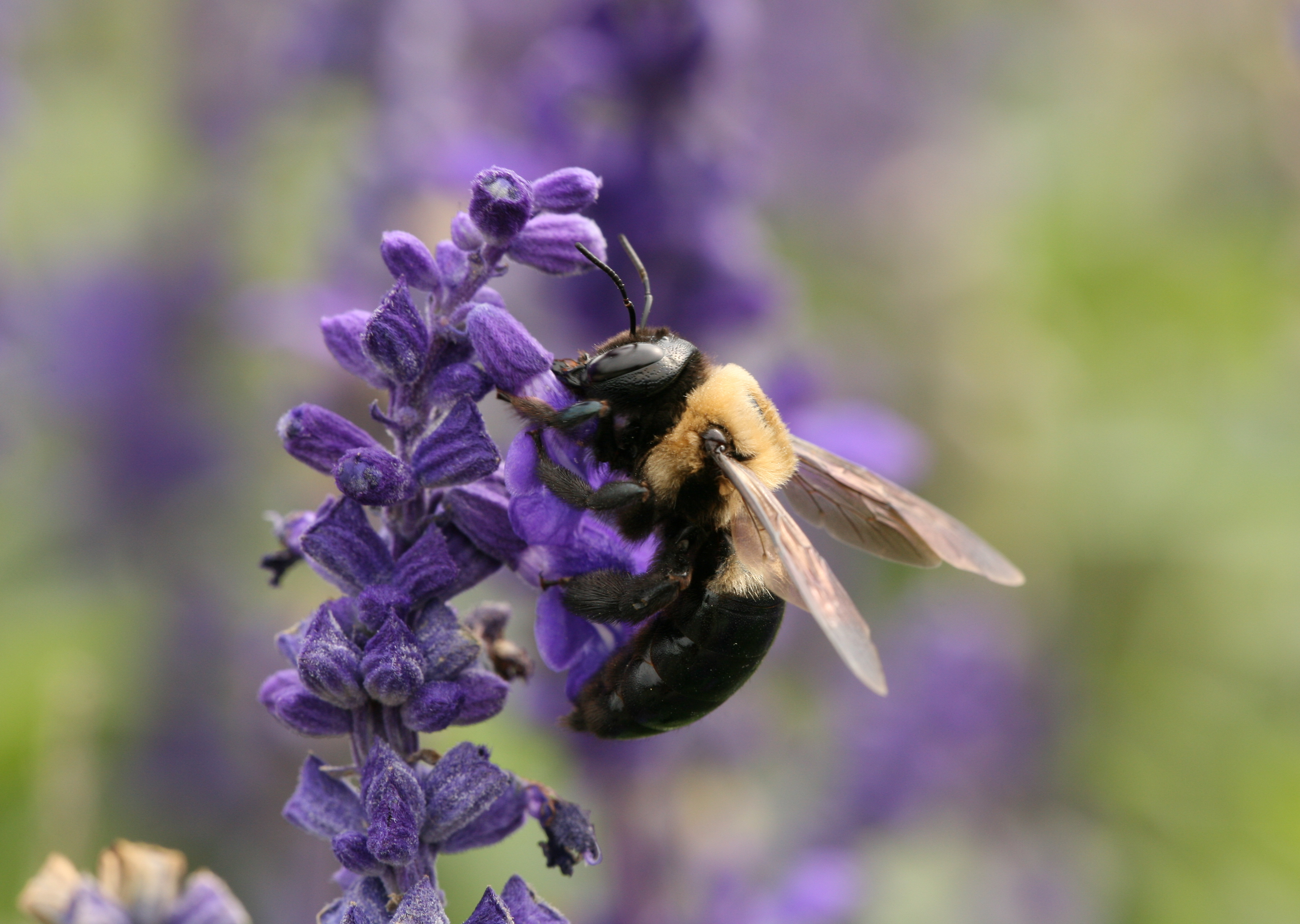
- A living Xylocopa, or carpenter bee
  †Xylocopa
  - †Xylocopa gabrielae – type locality for species
- †Xylomya
  - †Xylomya inornata – type locality for species
- †Xylomyia
  - †Xylomyia moratula – type locality for species
- †Xylonomus
  - †Xylonomus sejugatus – type locality for species
- †Xyronomys
  - †Xyronomys robinsoni – type locality for species

== Y ==
- †Ylasoia
  - †Ylasoia secunda – type locality for species
- †Yumaceras
  - †Yumaceras figginsi

== Z ==
- †Zacallites – type locality for genus
  - †Zacallites balli – type locality for species
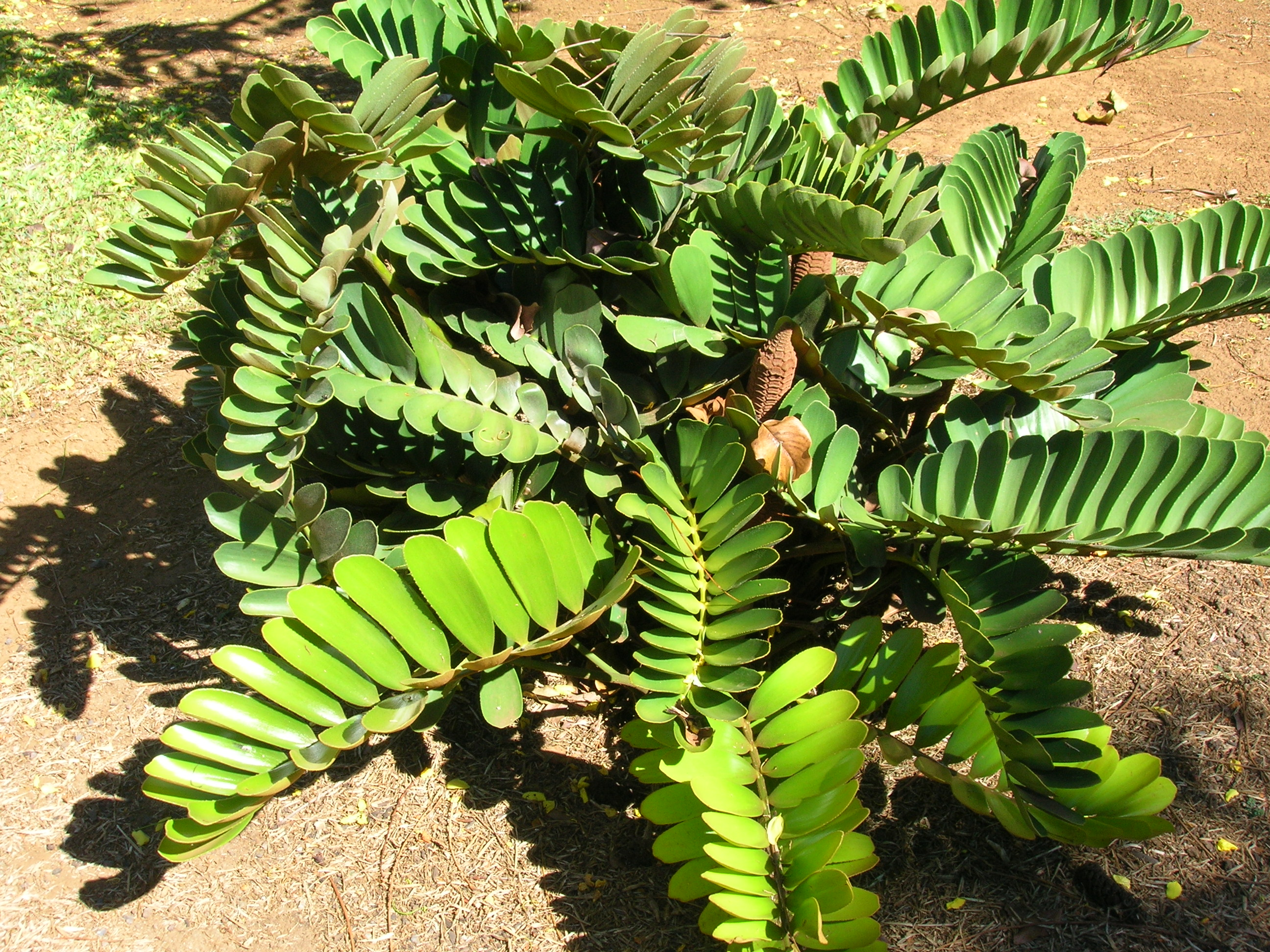
- A living Zamia cycad
  Zamia
  - †Zamia coloradensis
- †Zanycteris – type locality for genus
  - †Zanycteris honeyi – type locality for species
  - †Zanycteris paleocenus – type locality for species
- Zelkova
  - †Zelkova nervosa
  - †Zelkova planeroides
- †Zetobora
  - †Zetobora brunneri – type locality for species
- †Zingiberites
  - †Zingiberites dubius
- Zizyphus
  - †Zizyphus fibrillosus
  - †Zizyphus florissanti
- Zonotrichia
  - †Zonotrichia leucophrys
- †Zootermopsis
  - †Zootermopsis coloradensis – type locality for species
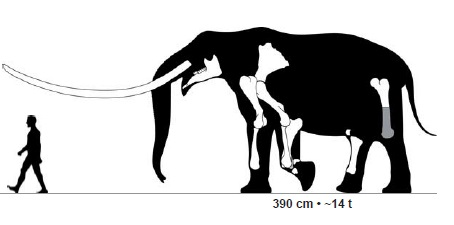
- Known material diagram depicting the Miocene-Pleistocene mastodon relative Zygolophodon with a human to scale
  †Zygolophodon
