= List of the prehistoric life of Colorado =

This list of the prehistoric life of Colorado contains the various prehistoric life-forms whose fossilized remains have been reported from within the US state of Colorado.

== Precambrian ==
The Paleobiology Database records no known occurrences of Precambrian fossils in Colorado.

== Paleozoic ==
=== Selected Paleozoic taxa of Colorado ===
- †Actinoceras
- †Aglaocrinus
- †Amorphognathus
- †Amplexus
- †Archaeocidaris
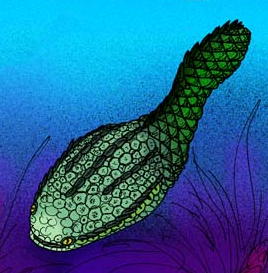
- Life restoration of the Middle-Late Ordovician jawless fish Astraspis
  †Astraspis – type locality for genus
  - †Astraspis desiderata – type locality for species
- †Athyris
- †Aviculopecten
- †Calamites
  - †Calamites cistii
  - †Calamites cruciatus
- †Callipteris
  - †Callipteris lyratifolia – or unidentified comparable form
- †Camarotoechia
- †Caninia
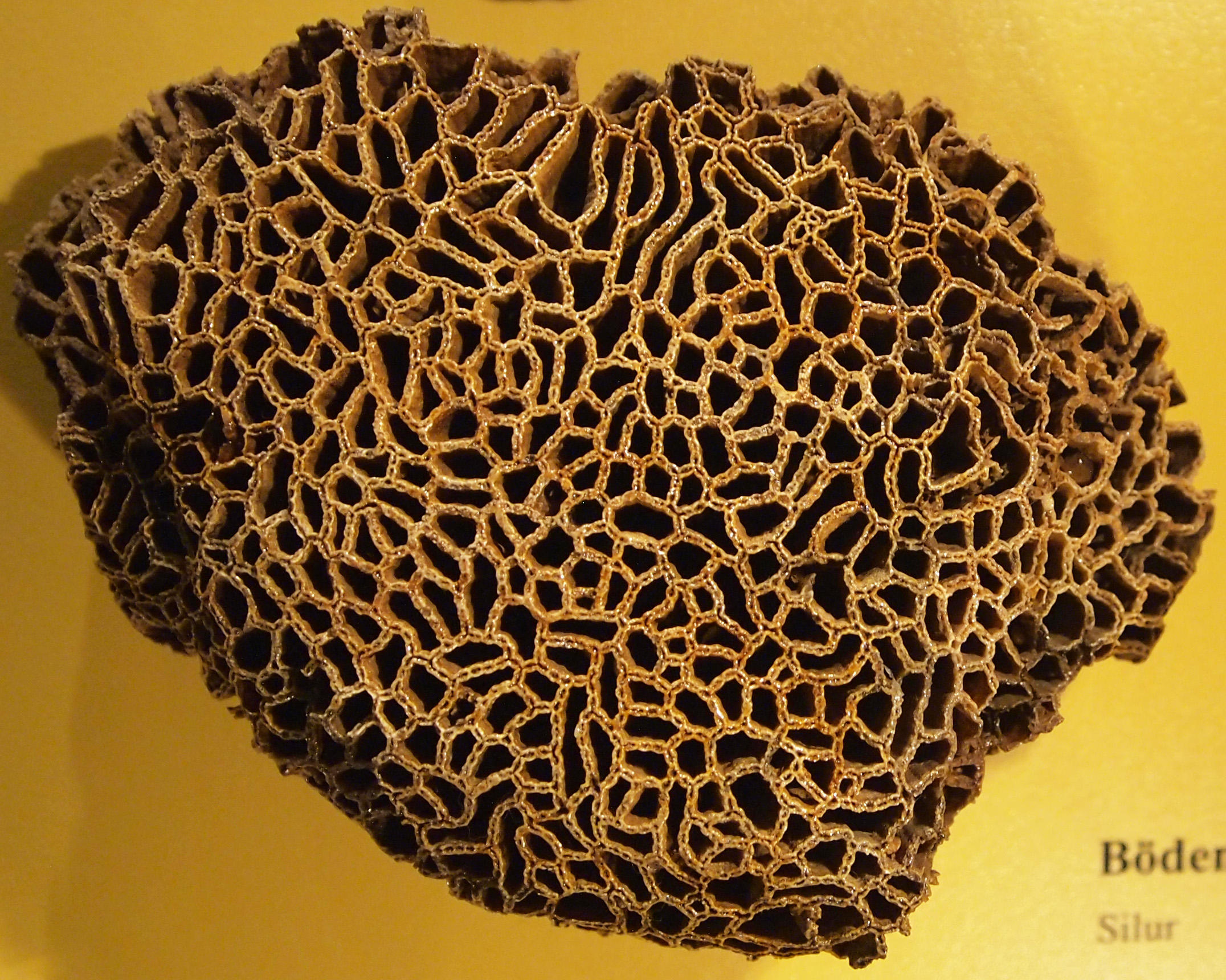
- Fossil of the Ordovician-Silurian tabulate coral Catenipora
  †Catenipora
- †Ceraurinus
- †Charactoceras – tentative report
- †Chirognathus
- †Composita
  - †Composita ovata
- †Conocardium
- †Cordaites
- †Cornulites
- †Crania
- †Ctenacanthus
  - †Ctenacanthus buttersi
  - †Ctenacanthus furcicarinatus
- †Cupressocrinites
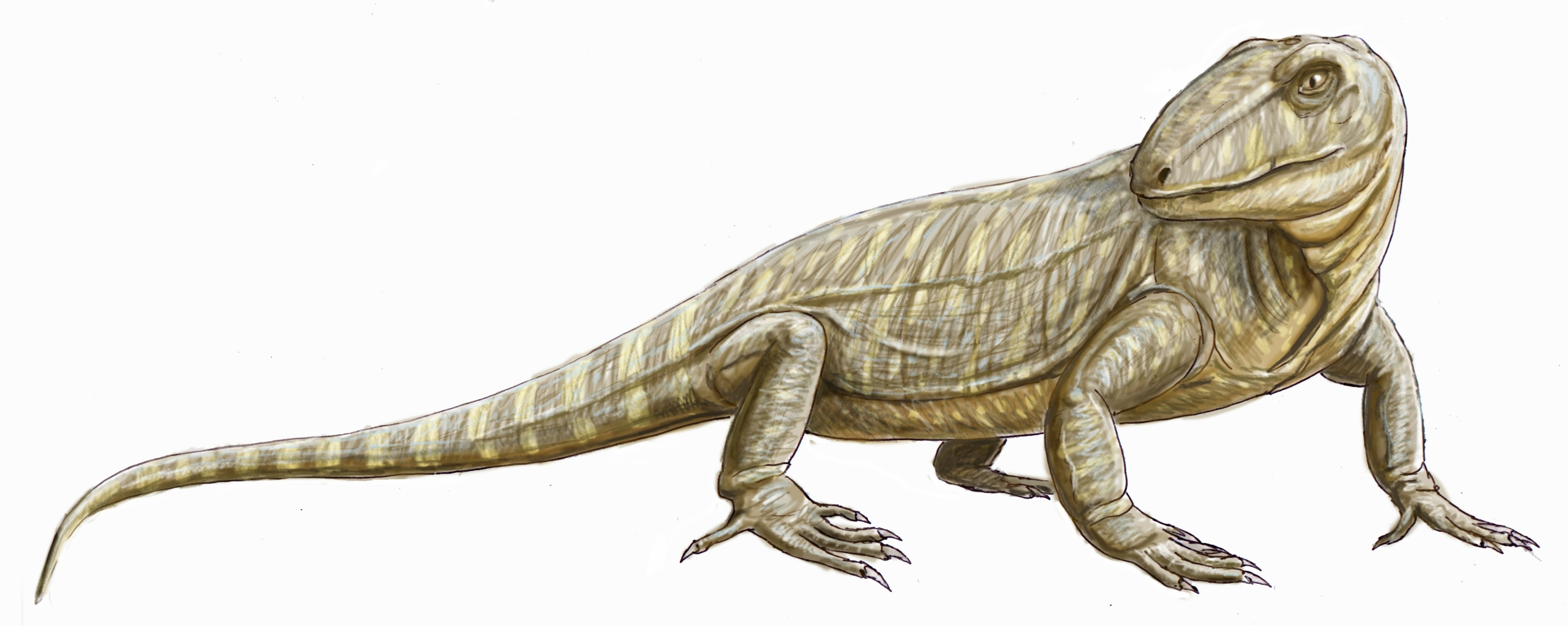
- Restoration of the Permian synapsid (mammal precursor) Cutleria
  †Cutleria – type locality for genus
  - †Cutleria wilmarthi – type locality for species
- †Cyclopteris
- †Cyrtogomphoceras
- †Cyrtospirifer
  - †Cyrtospirifer animasensis
  - †Cyrtospirifer whitneyi
- †Echinosphaerites – tentative report
- †Edestus
- †Endoceras
- †Eretmocrinus
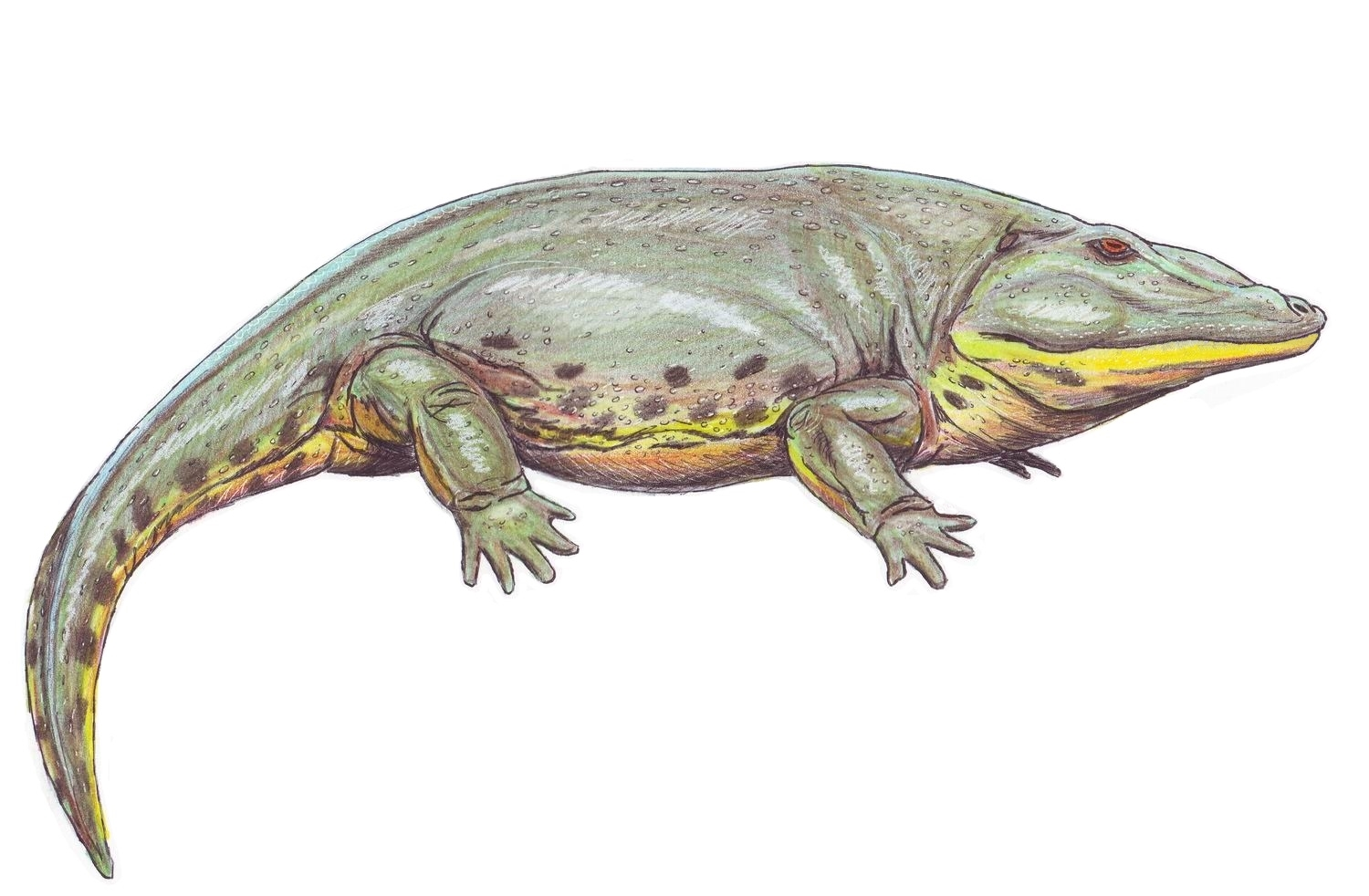
- Life restoration of the Carboniferous-Permian amphibian Eryops
  †Eryops
- †Euomphalus
- †Girvanella
- †Halysites
- †Isalaux – type locality for genus
- †Isonema
- †Kionoceras
- †Lambeoceras
- †Lepidodendron
- †Lepidostrobus
- †Limnoscelis
- †Lingula
- †Meristella
- †Neospirifer
  - †Neospirifer goreii
- †Neuropteris
  - †Neuropteris auriculata
  - †Neuropteris gigantea – tentative report
  - †Neuropteris heterophylla
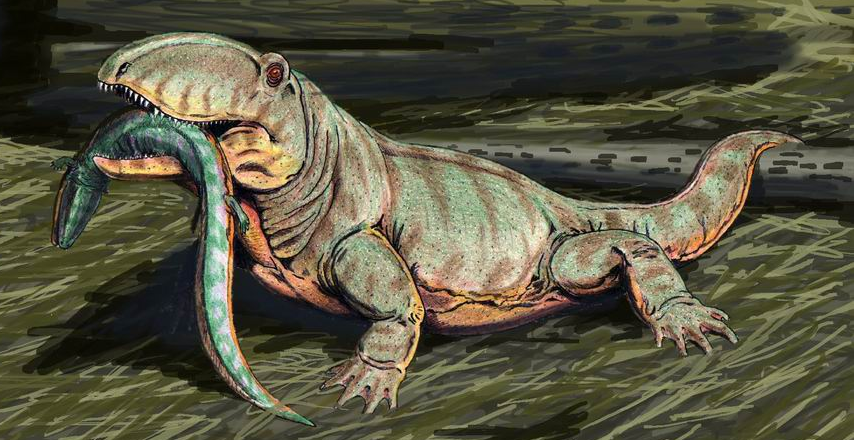
- Restoration of the Carboniferous-Permian synapsid (mammal precursor) Ophiacodon
  †Ophiacodon
- †Oradectes
- †Ormoceras
- †Orthoceras
- †Oulodus
- †Paladin – tentative report
- †Pecopteris
  - †Pecopteris arborescens
- †Plaesiomys
- †Platyceras
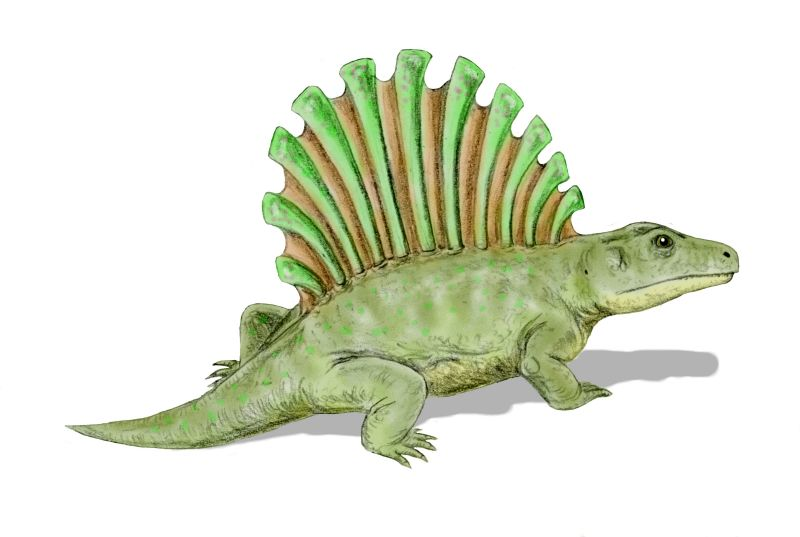
- Life restoration of the Carboniferous-Permian sail-backed amphibian Platyhystrix
  †Platyhystrix
  - †Platyhystrix rugosus
- †Pugnax
- †Receptaculites
- †Samaropsis
- †Sandia
- †Seymouria
- †Sigillaria
  - †Sigillaria elegans – or unidentified comparable form
- †Sphenophyllum
- †Sphenopteris
- †Spirifer
  - †Spirifer centronatus
- Spirorbis
- †Spyroceras
- †Stigmaria
- †Strepsodiscus – type locality for genus
- †Strophomena
- †Syringopora
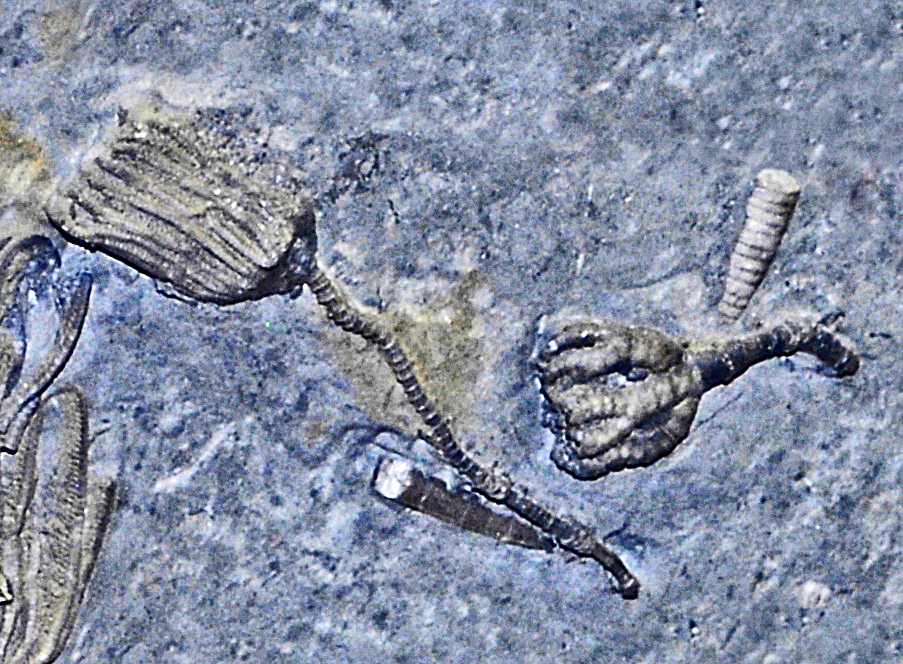
- Fossil of the Silurian-Carboniferous crinoid ("sea lily") Taxocrinus (right)
  †Taxocrinus
- †Walchia
- †Westonoceras

== Mesozoic ==
=== Selected Mesozoic taxa of Colorado ===
- Acmaea
- †Adocus
- †Albanerpeton
  - †Albanerpeton nexuosus
- †Albertosaurus – tentative report
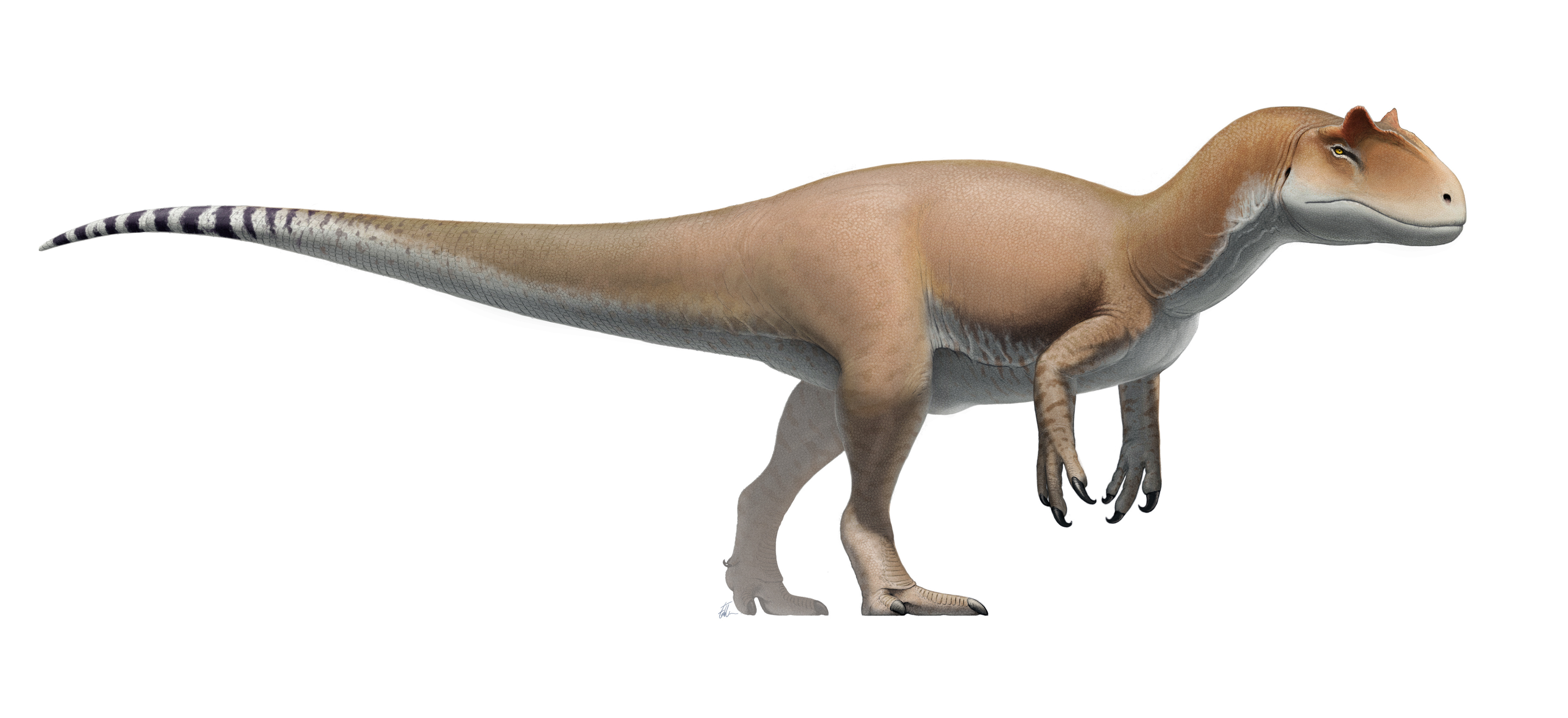
- Life restoration of the Late Jurassic theropod dinosaur Allosaurus
  †Allosaurus – type locality for genus
  - †Allosaurus fragilis – type locality for species
- †Amblotherium – type locality for genus
- Amia
- †Amphicoelias – type locality for genus
  - †Amphicoelias altus – type locality for species
- †Amphicotylus
  - †Amphicotylus lucasii – type locality for species
- †Anaklinoceras
- †Anisoceras
- †Anomia
- †Anomoepus – tentative report
- †Apateodus
- †Apatopus
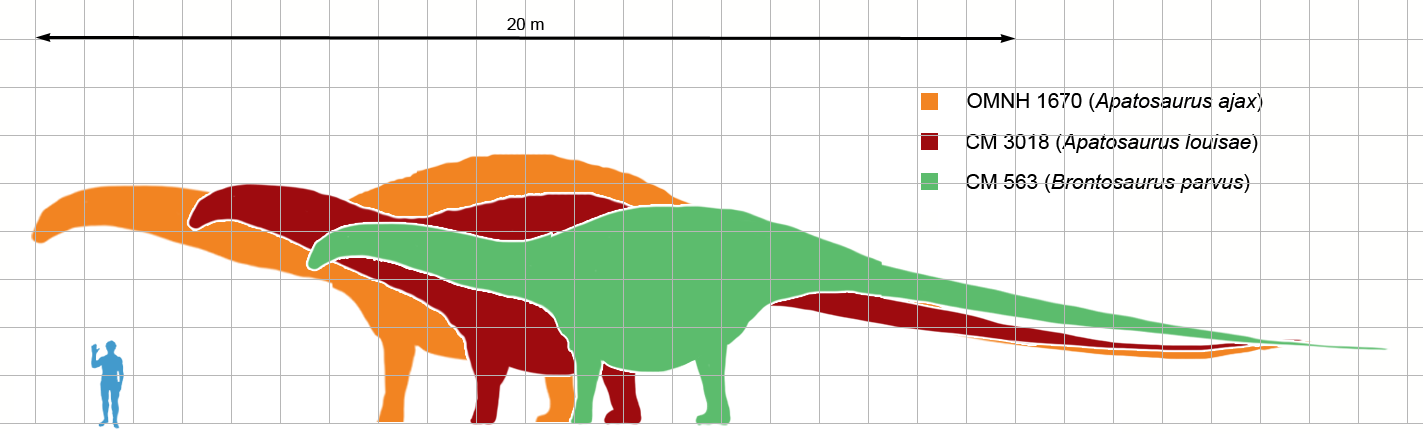
- Comparison of A. ajax (orange) and A. louisae (red) with a human (blue) and Brontosaurus parvus (green)
  †Apatosaurus – type locality for genus
  - †Apatosaurus ajax – type locality for species
  - †Apatosaurus louisae – type locality for species
- †Arenicolites
- Aspideretes
- Astarte
- †Atlantosaurus
  - †Atlantosaurus immanis – type locality for species
- †Axonoceras
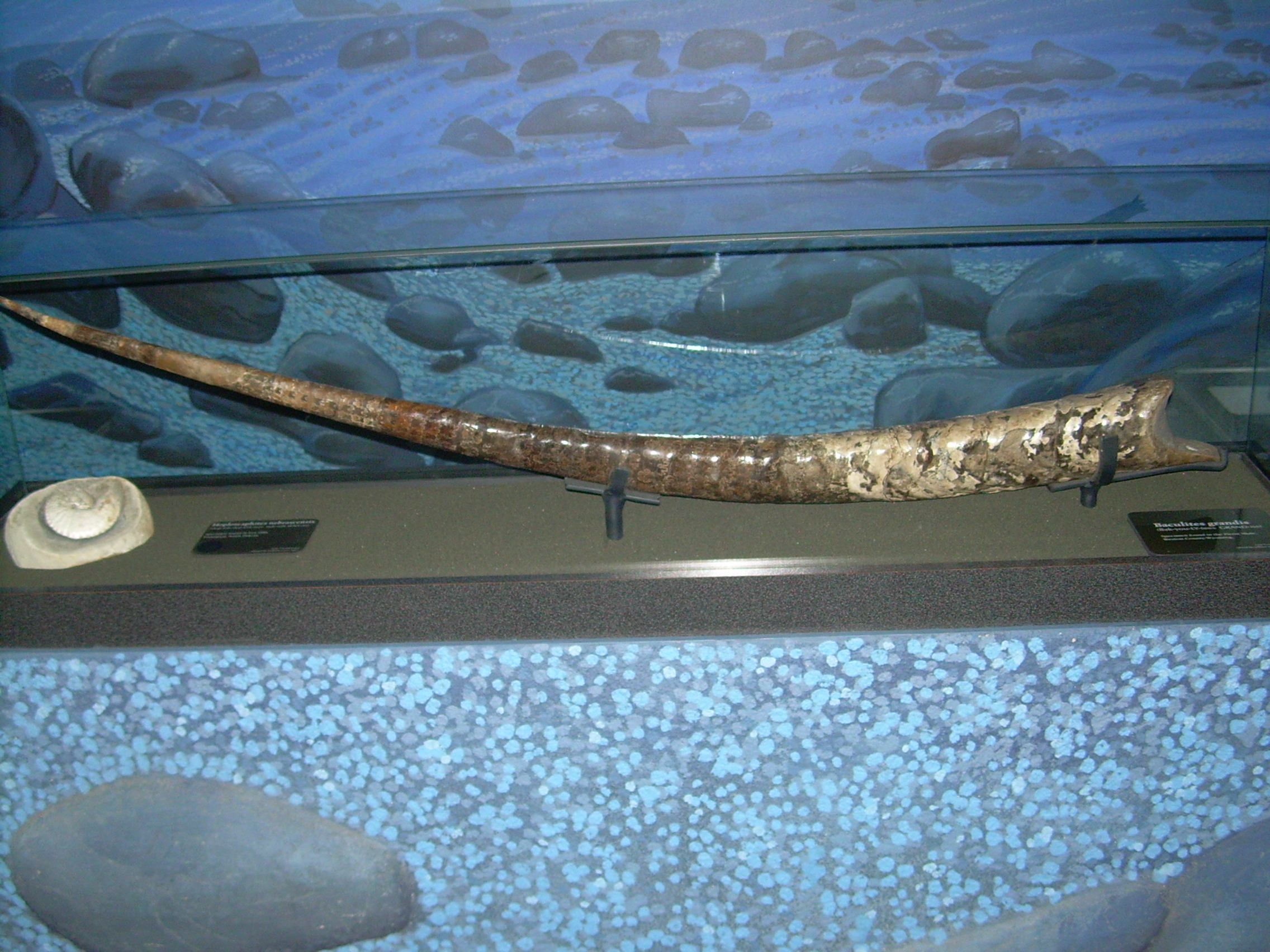
- Fossilized shell of the Late Cretaceous ammonoid cephalopod Baculites
  †Baculites
  - †Baculites aquilaensis
  - †Baculites asper
  - †Baculites clinolobatus – type locality for species
  - †Baculites codyensis
  - †Baculites compressus
  - †Baculites cuneatus
  - †Baculites grandis
  - †Baculites haresi
  - †Baculites mclearni
  - †Baculites meeki – type locality for species
  - †Baculites reesidei
- †Barosaurus
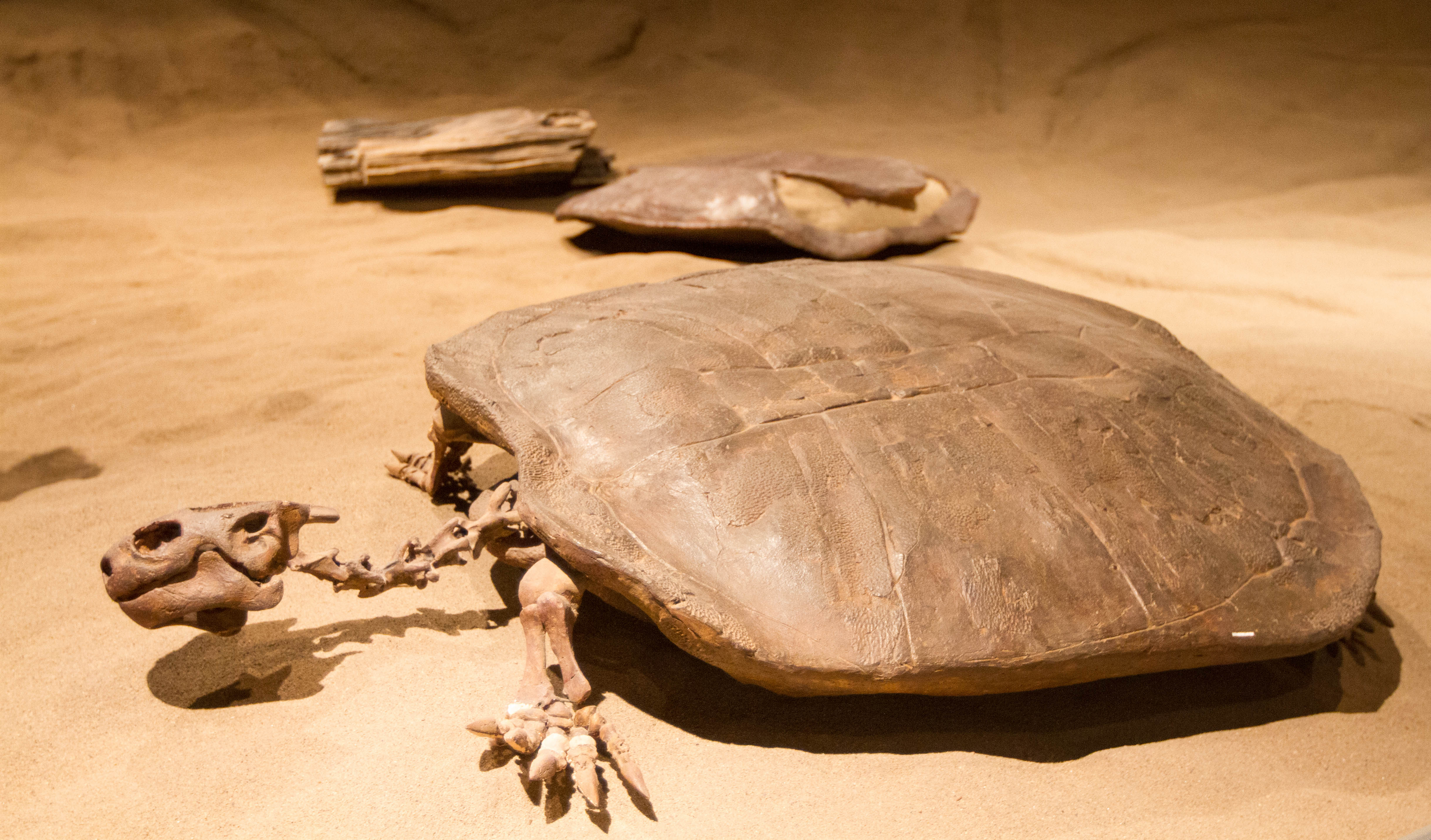
- Fossilized skeleton of the Cretaceous turtle Basilemys
  †Basilemys
- †Bison
  - †Bison alticornis – type locality for species
- †Borealosuchus
  - †Borealosuchus sternbergii
- †Brachauchenius – or unidentified comparable form
- †Brachiosaurus – type locality for genus
  - †Brachiosaurus altithorax – type locality for species
- †Brachychampsa
  - †Brachychampsa montana
- †Brachyphyllum
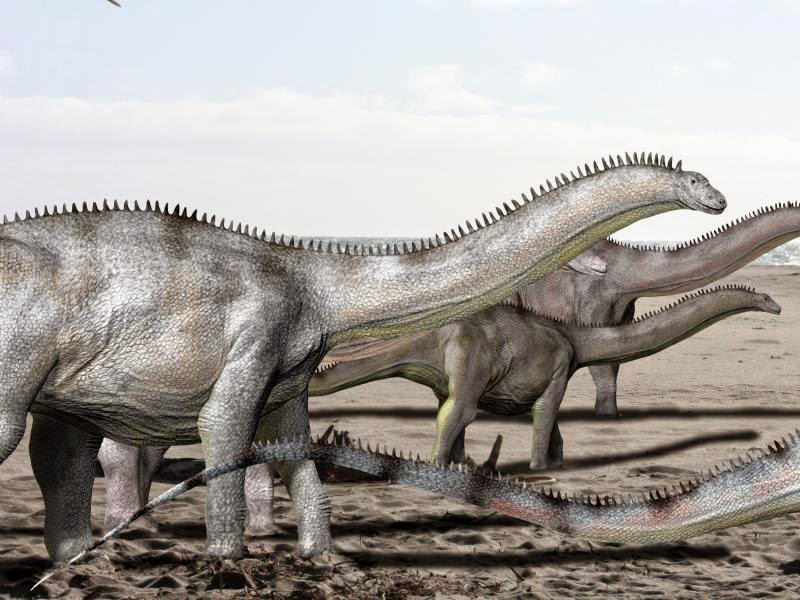
- Life restoration of a herd of the Late Jurassic sauropod dinosaur Brontosaurus
  †Brontosaurus
  - †Brontosaurus excelsus
  - †Brontosaurus yahnahpin
- †Calycoceras
- †Camarasaurus – type locality for genus
  - †Camarasaurus grandis
  - †Camarasaurus lewisi
  - †Camarasaurus supremus – type locality for species
- †Camptosaurus – type locality for genus
  - †Camptosaurus dispar – type locality for species
- Carcharias
- †Caririchnium
- †Cedrobaena
- †Ceratodus – type locality for genus
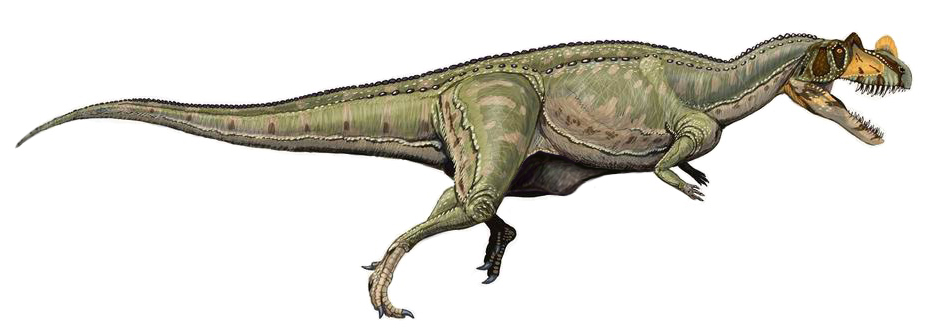
- Restoration of the Late Jurassic ceratosaur Ceratosaurus
  †Ceratosaurus – type locality for genus
  - †Ceratosaurus nasicornis – type locality for species
- Cerithiopsis
- †Champsosaurus
- Chara
- †Chelonipus
- †Chinlea
- †Chirotherium
  - †Chirotherium lulli
- †Cimolichthys
  - †Cimolichthys nepaholica
- †Cimolodon – or unidentified comparable form
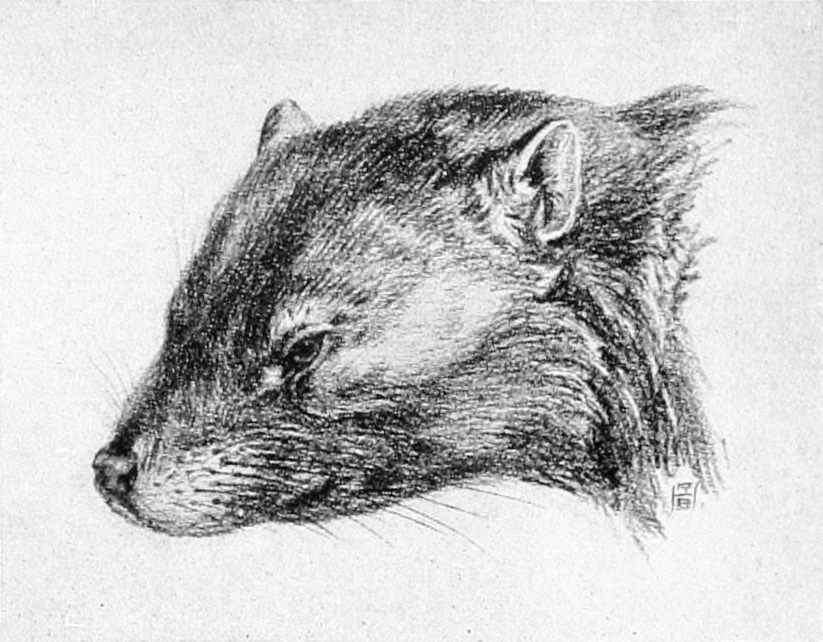
- Life restoration of the face of the Late Cretaceous multituberculate mammal Cimolomys
  †Cimolomys
- †Cionodon – type locality for genus
  - †Cionodon arctatus – type locality for species
- †Cirroceras
- †Clidastes
- †Coelophysis – tentative report
- †Coelurus
  - †Coelurus fragilis
- †Compsemys
- †Coniasaurus
- Corbula
- †Crenella
- †Cretolamna
  - †Cretolamna appendiculata
- †Cretoxyrhina
  - †Cretoxyrhina mantelli
- Cucullaea
- Cuspidaria
- †Didymoceras
  - †Didymoceras cheyennense
  - †Didymoceras stevensoni
- †Dinehichnus
- †Dinochelys
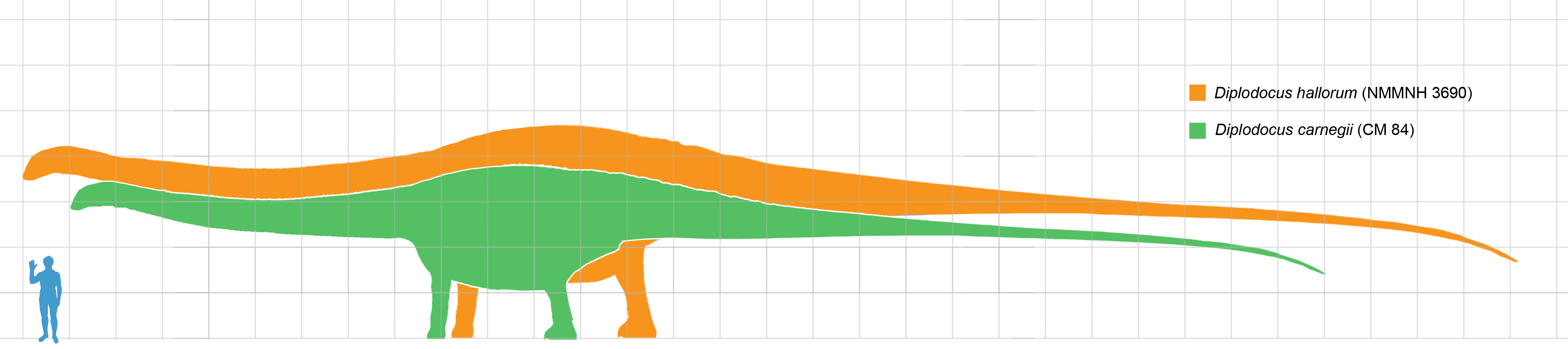
- Diagram illustrating the Late Jurassic sauropod dinosaurs Diplodocus carnegii (green) and D. hallorum (orange) with an anachronistic human to scale.
  †Diplodocus – type locality for genus
  - †Diplodocus lacustris – type locality for species
  - †Diplodocus longus – type locality for species
- †Diplosaurus
- Discinisca
- †Discoscaphites
  - †Discoscaphites conradi
- †Docodon
- †Dorsetisaurus
- †Dorsetochelys
- †Dryosaurus
  - †Dryosaurus altus
- †Edmontonia
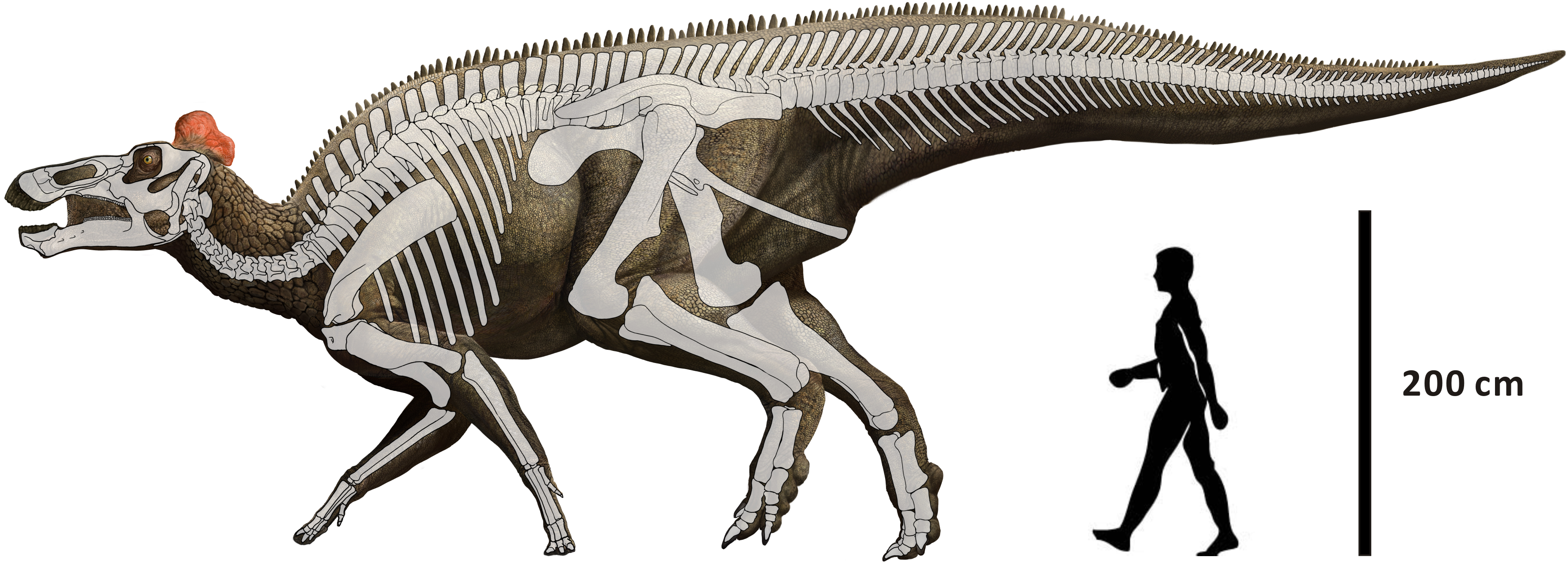
- Skeletal reconstruction and restored soft tissue of the Late Cretaceous duck-billed dinosaur Edmontosaurus regalis with an anachronistic human to scale
  †Edmontosaurus
  - †Edmontosaurus regalis – type locality for species
- Eilenodon – type locality for genus
- †Elopopsis
- †Enchodus
  - †Enchodus gladiolus – or unidentified comparable form
  - †Enchodus shumardi – or unidentified comparable form
- †Equisetum
- †Eubrontes
  - †Eubrontes giganteus
- †Eucalycoceras
- †Euomphaloceras
- †Eutrephoceras
- †Eutretauranosuchus – type locality for genus
  - †Eutretauranosuchus delfsi – type locality for species
- †Exiteloceras
- †Exogyra
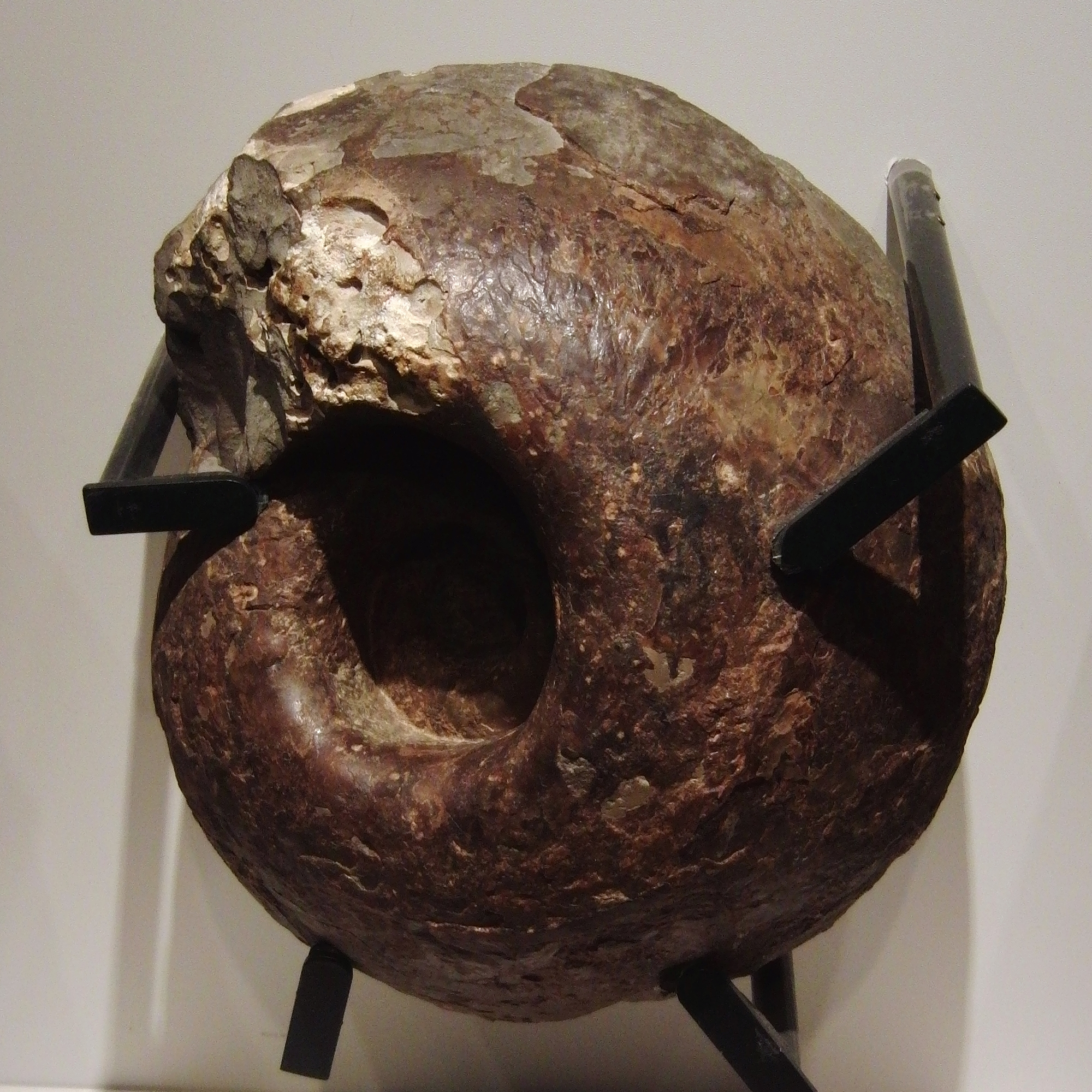
- Fossilized shell of the Late Cretaceous ammonoid cephalopod Fagesia
  †Fagesia
- Ficus
- †Forresteria
- †Fruitachampsa – type locality for genus
  - †Fruitachampsa callisoni – type locality for species
- †Fruitadens – type locality for genus
  - †Fruitadens haagarorum – type locality for species
- †Fruitafossor – type locality for genus
  - †Fruitafossor windscheffeli – type locality for species
- †Galeamopus
  - †Galeamopus pabsti
- †Glirodon
  - †Glirodon grandis
- †Glyptops
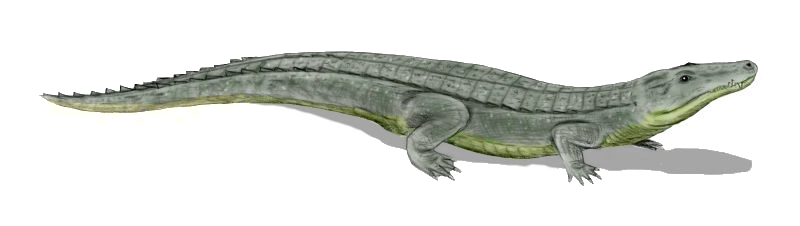
- Restoration of the Late Jurassic-Early Cretaceous crocodile relative Goniopholis
  †Goniopholis
- †Grallator
- †Hallopus
  - †Hallopus victor – type locality for species
- †Haplocanthosaurus – type locality for genus
  - †Haplocanthosaurus delfsi – type locality for species
  - †Haplocanthosaurus priscus – type locality for species
- †Hemicalypterus
- †Herrickiceras
- †Hoploscaphites
  - †Hoploscaphites birkelundae
  - †Hoploscaphites nicolletii
- †Hulettia – report made of unidentified related form or using admittedly obsolete nomenclature
- †Hypsirophus – type locality for genus
- †Ichthyodectes
- †Ignotornis – type locality for genus
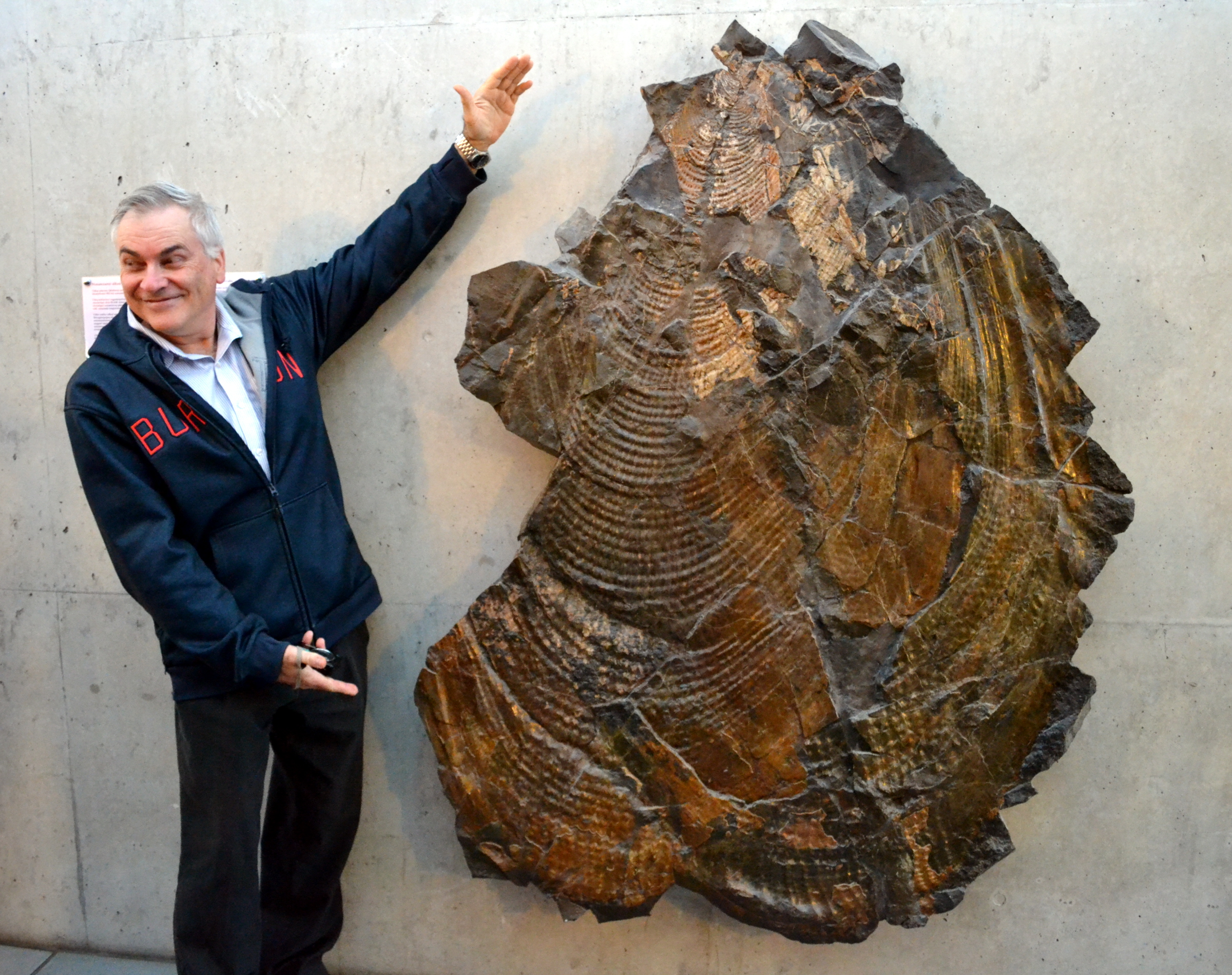
- Fossilized shell of the Early Jurassic-Late Cretaceous marine bivalve Inoceramus with a human indicating its size
  †Inoceramus
  - †Inoceramus altus
  - †Inoceramus altusiformis
  - †Inoceramus anomalus
  - †Inoceramus arnoldi
  - †Inoceramus balticus
  - †Inoceramus brancoiformis
  - †Inoceramus bueltenensis
  - †Inoceramus cordiformis
  - †Inoceramus crippsi – or unidentified related form
  - †Inoceramus deformis
  - †Inoceramus erectus
  - †Inoceramus flavus
  - †Inoceramus grandis
  - †Inoceramus longealatus
  - †Inoceramus muelleri - or unidentified loosely related form
  - †Inoceramus oblongus
  - †Inoceramus pictus
  - †Inoceramus prefragilis
  - †Inoceramus rutherfordi – or unidentified comparable form
  - †Inoceramus tenuistriatus – tentative report
- †Ischyrhiza
  - †Ischyrhiza avonicola – or unidentified comparable form
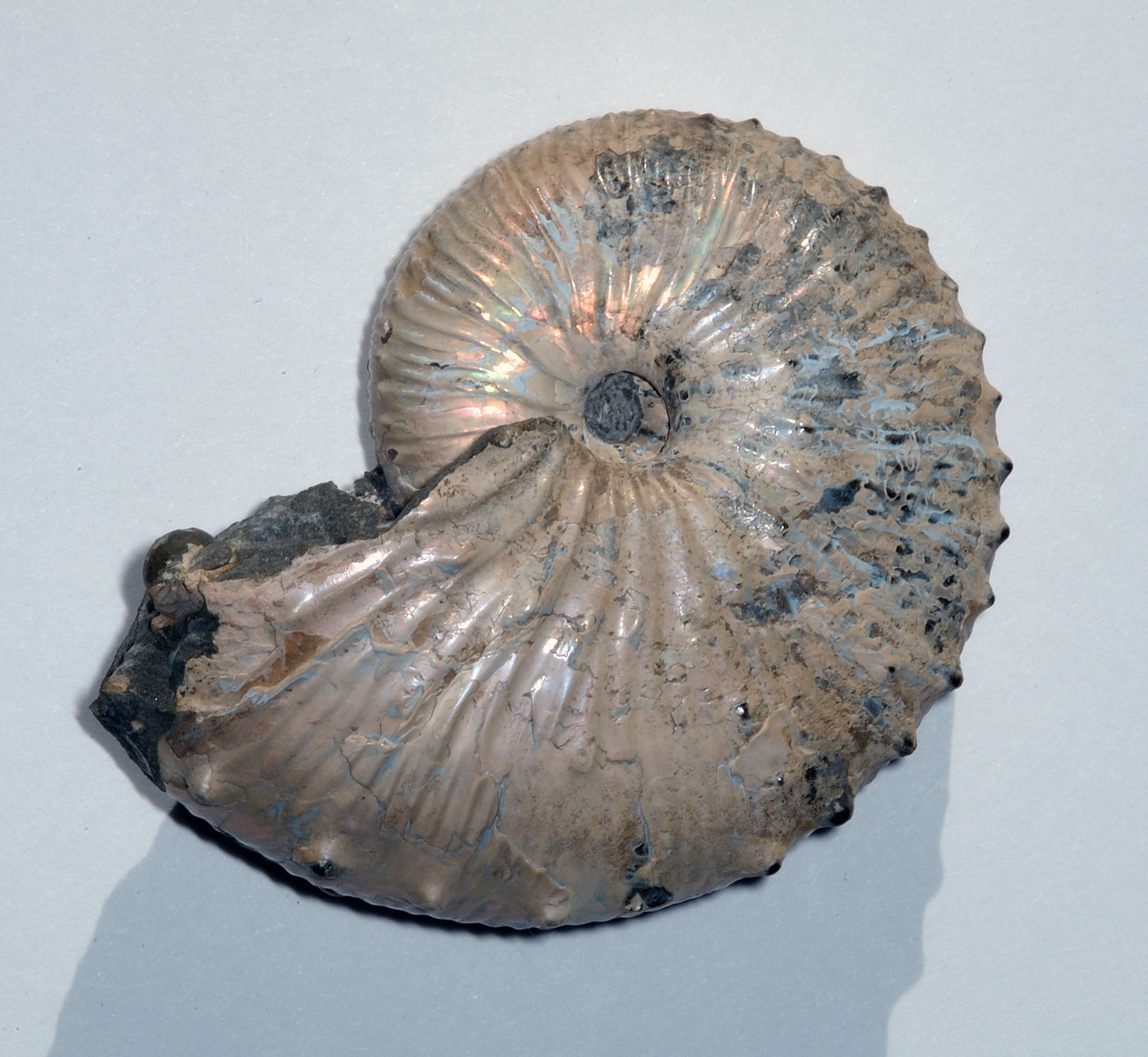
- Fossilized shell of the Late Cretaceous ammonoid cephalopod Jeletzkytes
  †Jeletzkytes
  - †Jeletzkytes brevis
  - †Jeletzkytes dorfi
  - †Jeletzkytes nodosus
- †Kepodactylus – type locality for genus
  - †Kepodactylus insperatus – type locality for species
- †Laosaurus – report made of unidentified related form or using admittedly obsolete nomenclature
- Lepisosteus – tentative report
- †Leptalestes – tentative report
  - †Leptalestes cooki
- †Leptolepis – or unidentified comparable form
- Lima
- †Lingula
- †Lioestheria
- †Lisserpeton
  - †Lisserpeton bairdi
- †Lonchidion
- †Lucina
- †Macelognathus
- †Magnoavipes
- †Marshosaurus – or unidentified comparable form
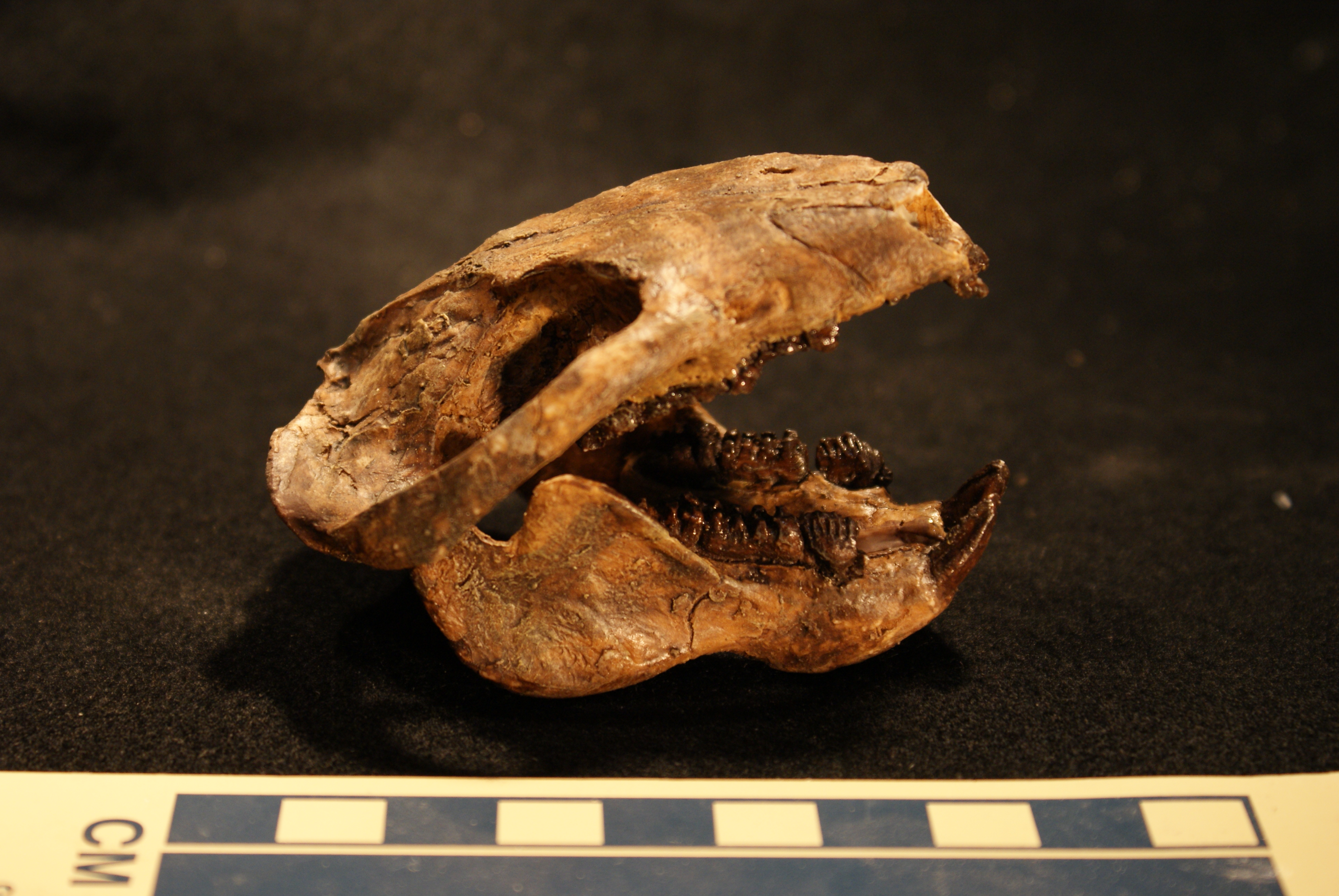
- Fossilized skull of the Late Cretaceous multituberculate mammal Meniscoessus
  †Meniscoessus
  - †Meniscoessus collomensis – type locality for species
  - †Meniscoessus robustus – or unidentified comparable form
- †Mesadactylus – type locality for genus
  - †Mesadactylus ornithosphyos – type locality for species
- †Mesodma
  - †Mesodma formosa – or unidentified comparable form
- †Mesojassoides – type locality for genus
  - †Mesojassoides gigantea – type locality for species
- †Metoicoceras
  - †Metoicoceras geslinianum
- †Micropycnodon
- †Modiolus
- †Morosaurus
- †Morrolepis
- †Myledaphus
  - †Myledaphus bipartitus
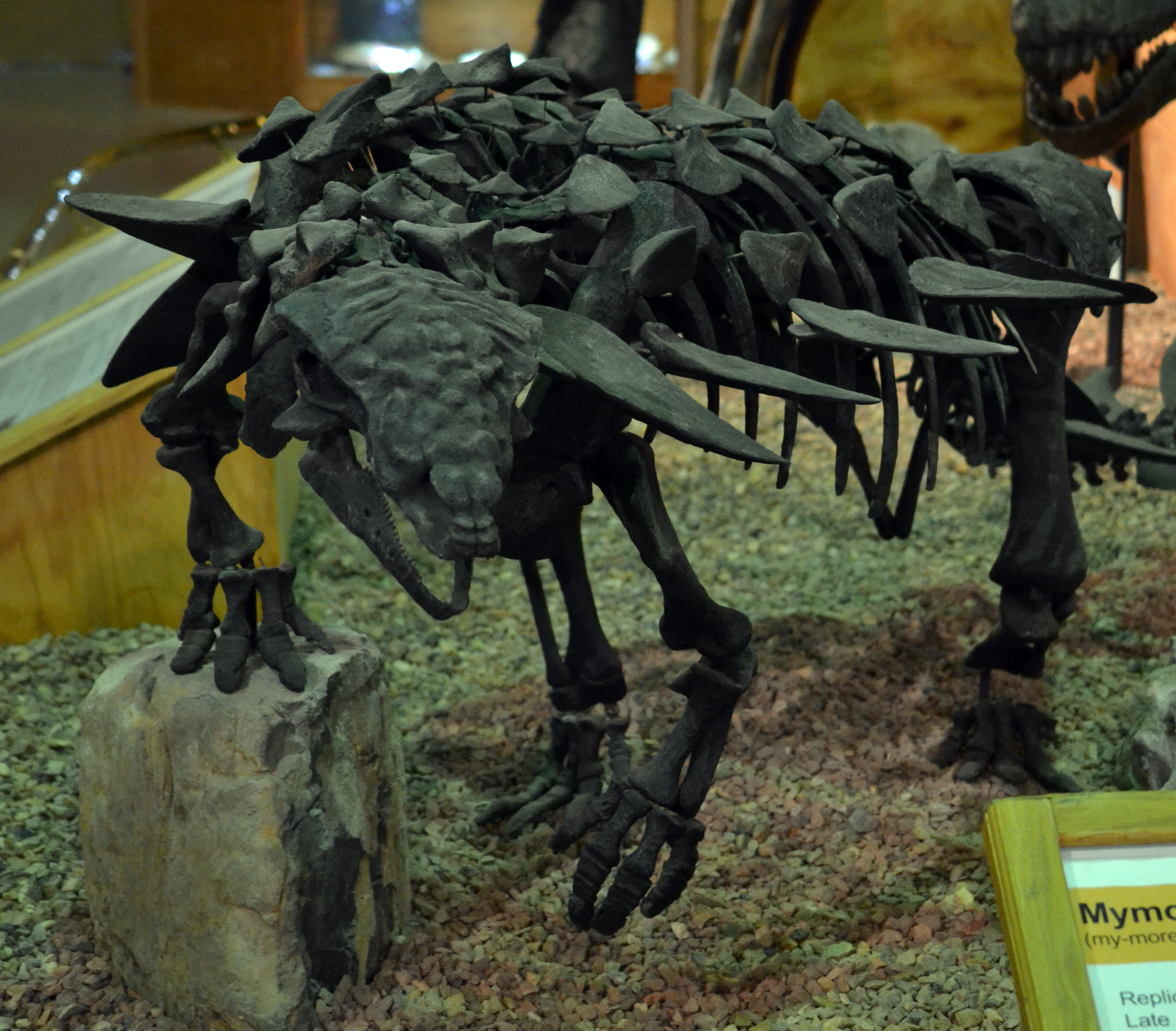
- Fossilized skeleton of the Late Jurassic armored dinosaur Mymoorapelta
  †Mymoorapelta – type locality for genus
  - †Mymoorapelta maysi – type locality for species
- Myrica
- †Nanosaurus – type locality for genus
  - †Nanosaurus agilis – type locality for species
  - †Nanosaurus rex
- Natica
- †Neocardioceras
  - †Neocardioceras densicostatum – type locality for species
  - †Neocardioceras juddii
  - †Neocardioceras laevigatum
  - †Neocardioceras minutum
  - †Neocardioceras uptonense
- †Neoptychites
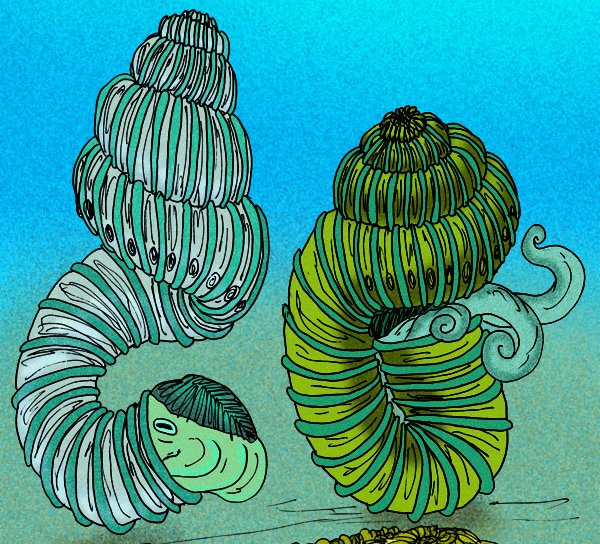
- Restoration of several species of the Late Cretaceous ammonoid cephalopod Nostoceras
  †Nostoceras
  - †Nostoceras approximans – or unidentified comparable form
  - †Nostoceras larimerense – type locality for species
  - †Nostoceras monotuberculatum
  - †Nostoceras obtusum – or unidentified comparable form
  - †Nostoceras splendidum – or unidentified comparable form
- Nucula
  - †Nucula percrassa
- †Odaxosaurus
  - †Odaxosaurus piger
- †Opisthias
- †Opisthotriton
- †Ornitholestes – tentative report
- †Ornithomimipus
- †Ornithomimus – type locality for genus
  - †Ornithomimus velox – type locality for species
- Ostrea
- †Othnielia – tentative report
- †Othnielosaurus
  - †Othnielosaurus consors
- †Oxytoma
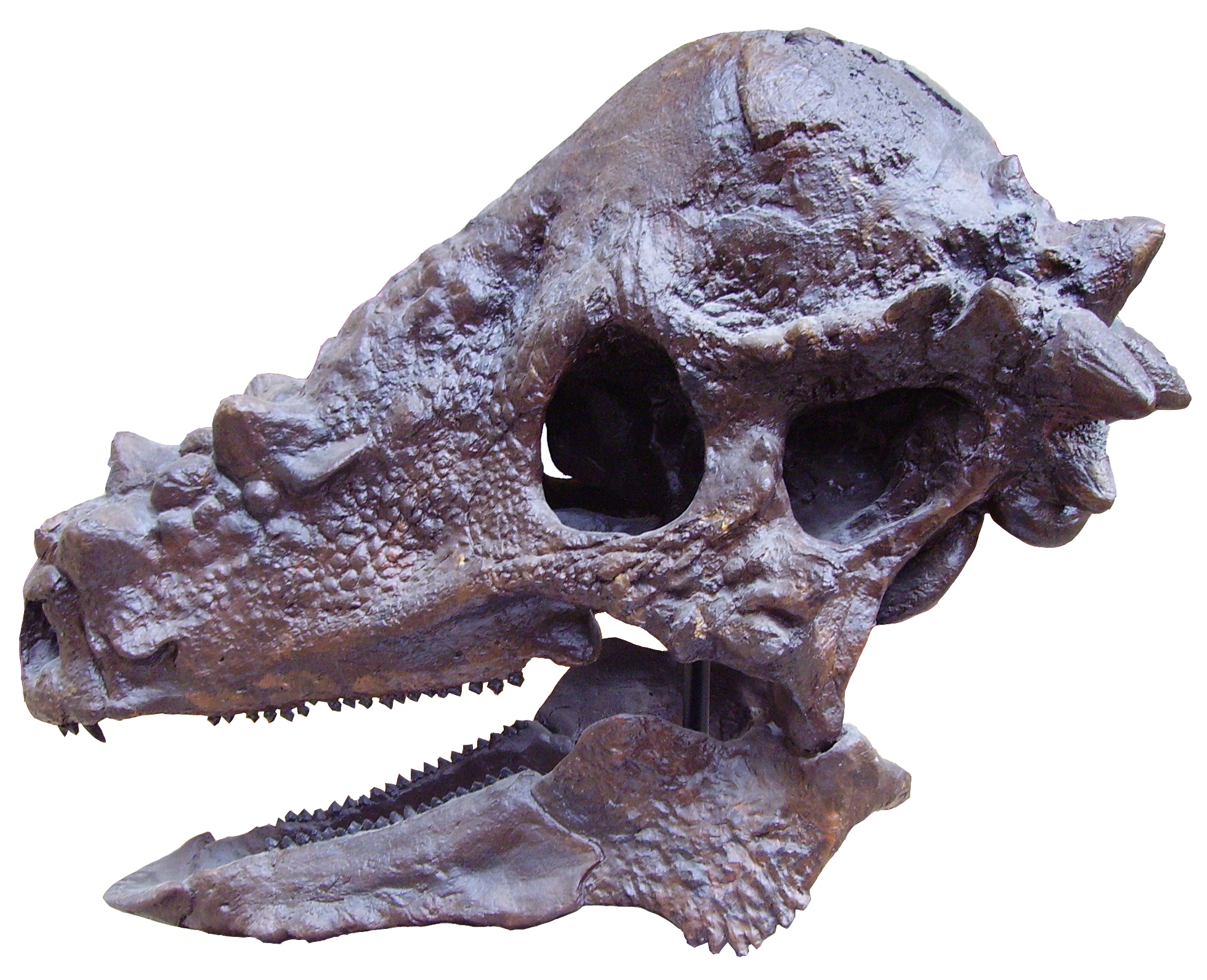
- Fossilized skull of the Late Cretaceous dome-headed dinosaur Pachycephalosaurus
  †Pachycephalosaurus
- †Pachyrhizodus
  - †Pachyrhizodus minimus
- †Palaeobalistum
- †Palaeopteryx – type locality for genus
- †Parabrontopodus – type locality for genus
- †Paramacellodus
- †Paressonodon – type locality for genus
- †Parikimys – type locality for genus
- †Parviraptor
- †Pentaceratops
  - †Pentaceratops sternbergii
- †Pinna
- †Placenticeras
  - †Placenticeras meeki
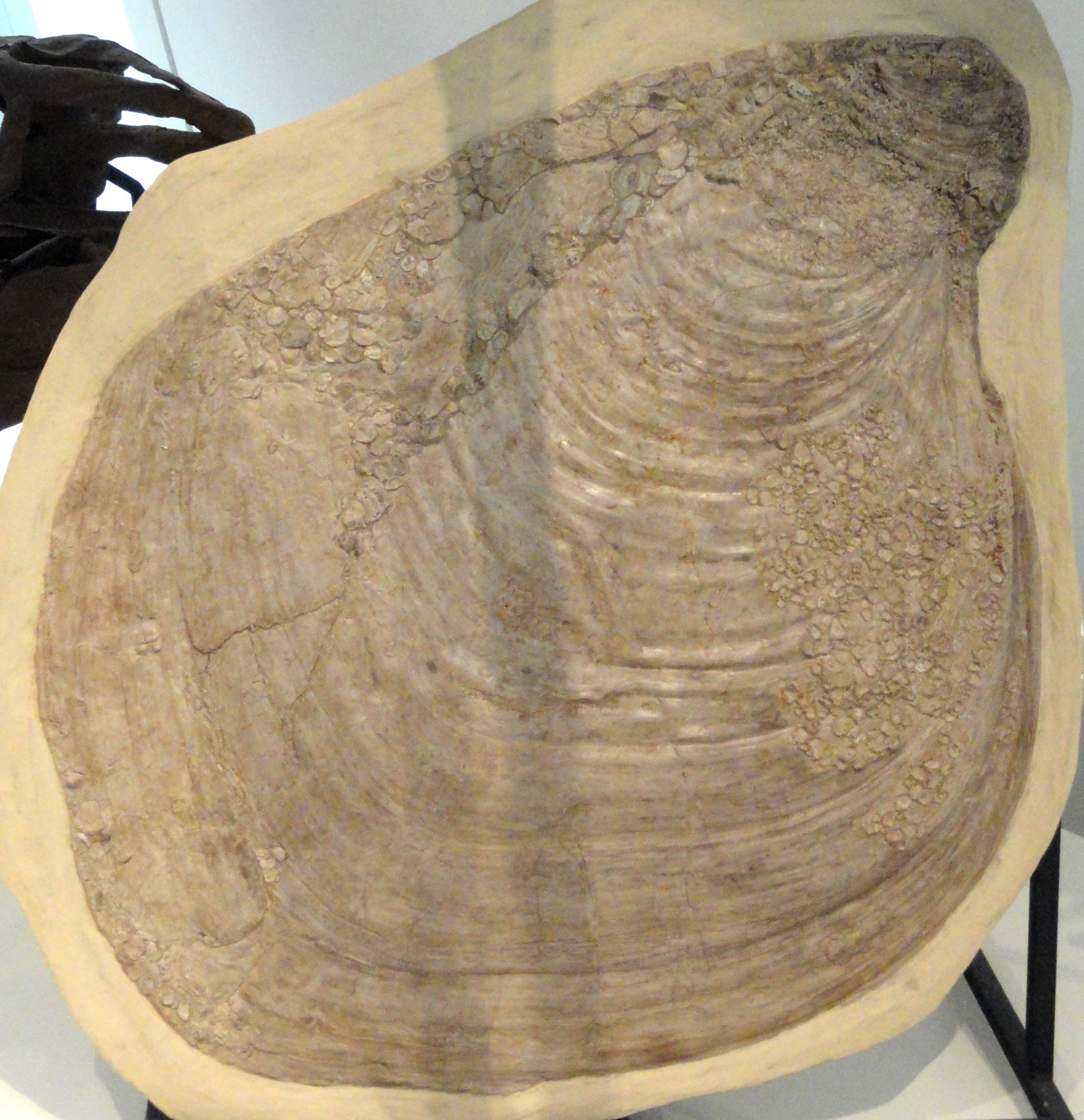
- Fossilized shell of the Cretaceous marine bivalve Platyceramus
  †Platyceramus
  - †Platyceramus ahsenensis
  - †Platyceramus cycloides
  - †Platyceramus mantelli - or unidentified loosely related form
  - †Platyceramus platinus
- †Platyognathus
- †Plesiobaena
- †Polyonax – type locality for genus
  - †Polyonax mortuarius – type locality for species
- †Preprismatoolithus
- †Priacodon
  - †Priacodon fruitaensis – type locality for species
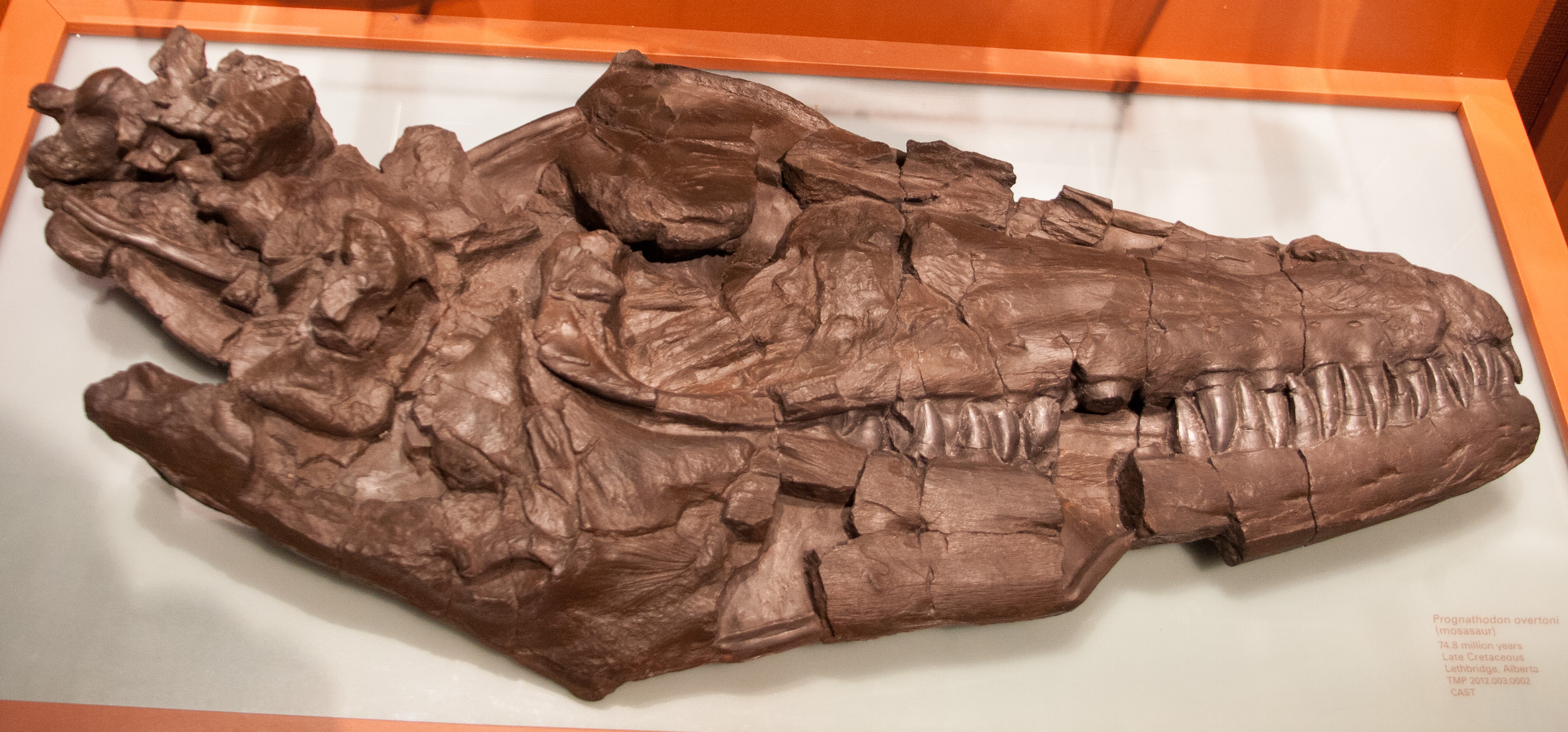
- Fossilized skull of the Late Cretaceous mosasaur Prognathodon
  †Prognathodon
  - †Prognathodon overtoni
  - †Prognathodon stadtmani – type locality for species
- Propeamussium
- †Protocardia
- †Protosphyraena
- Prunus
- †Pseudoperna
  - †Pseudoperna congesta
- †Pseudotetrasauropus – tentative report
- †Pteraichnus
- †Ptychodus
  - †Ptychodus anonymus
  - †Ptychodus decurrens
  - †Ptychodus occidentalis
  - †Ptychodus whipplei
- Pycnodonte
  - †Pycnodonte newberryi
- Rhinobatos
  - †Rhinobatos incertus
- †Rosselia
- †Saurillodon
- †Scapherpeton
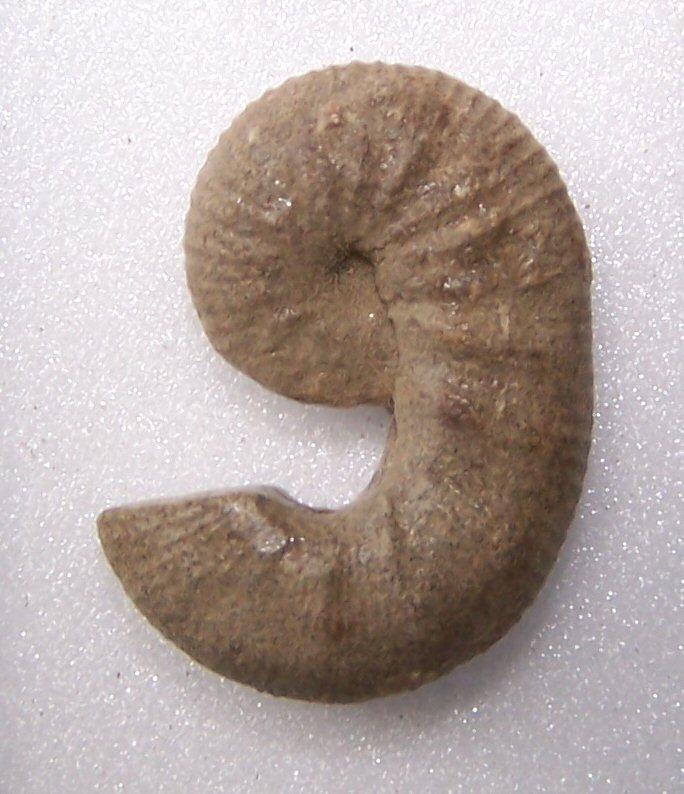
- Fossilized shell of the Late Cretaceous ammonoid cephalopod Scaphites
  †Scaphites
  - †Scaphites binneyi
  - †Scaphites depressus
  - †Scaphites hippocrepis – or unidentified comparable form
  - †Scaphites nodosus
- †Scoyenia
- †Selaginella
- †Semionotus
- †Sphenodiscus
  - †Sphenodiscus pleurisepta
- Squalicorax
  - †Squalicorax curvatus
  - †Squalicorax falcatus
  - †Squalicorax pristodontus
- †Squatirhina
  - †Squatirhina americana
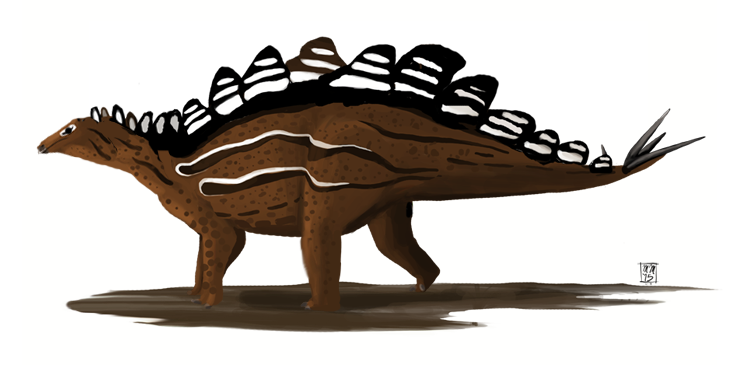
- Restoration of the Late Jurassic stegosaur Stegosaurus
  †Stegosaurus – type locality for genus
  - †Stegosaurus armatus – type locality for species
  - †Stegosaurus stenops – type locality for species
  - †Stegosaurus ungulatus
- †Stenomyti – type locality for genus
  - †Stenomyti huangae – type locality for species
- †Stokesosaurus – or unidentified comparable form
- †Supersaurus – type locality for genus
  - †Supersaurus vivianae – type locality for species
- Tellina
- †Tenea
- Teredo
- †Thalassomedon – type locality for genus
  - †Thalassomedon hanningtoni – type locality for species
- †Theiophytalia – type locality for genus
  - †Theiophytalia kerri – type locality for species
- †Therangospodus – or unidentified comparable form
- †Thescelosaurus
- †Titanosaurus
  - †Titanosaurus montanus – type locality for species
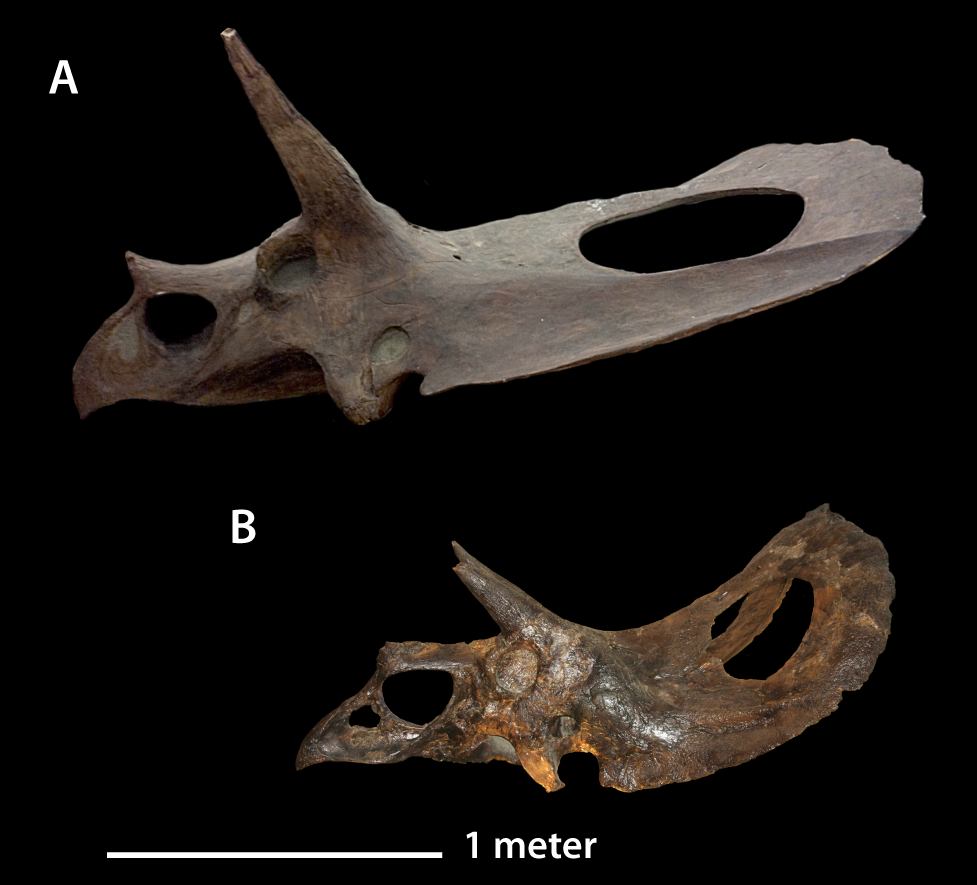
- Fossilized skulls of the Late Cretaceous horned dinosaurs Torosaurus (A) and Triceratops (B) to scale
  †Torosaurus
  - †Torosaurus latus
- †Torvosaurus – type locality for genus
  - †Torvosaurus tanneri – type locality for species
- †Treptichnus
- †Triceratops
  - †Triceratops galeus – type locality for species
  - †Triceratops horridus
- †Trinacromerum – or unidentified comparable form
- Turritella
- †Tylosaurus
  - †Tylosaurus proriger
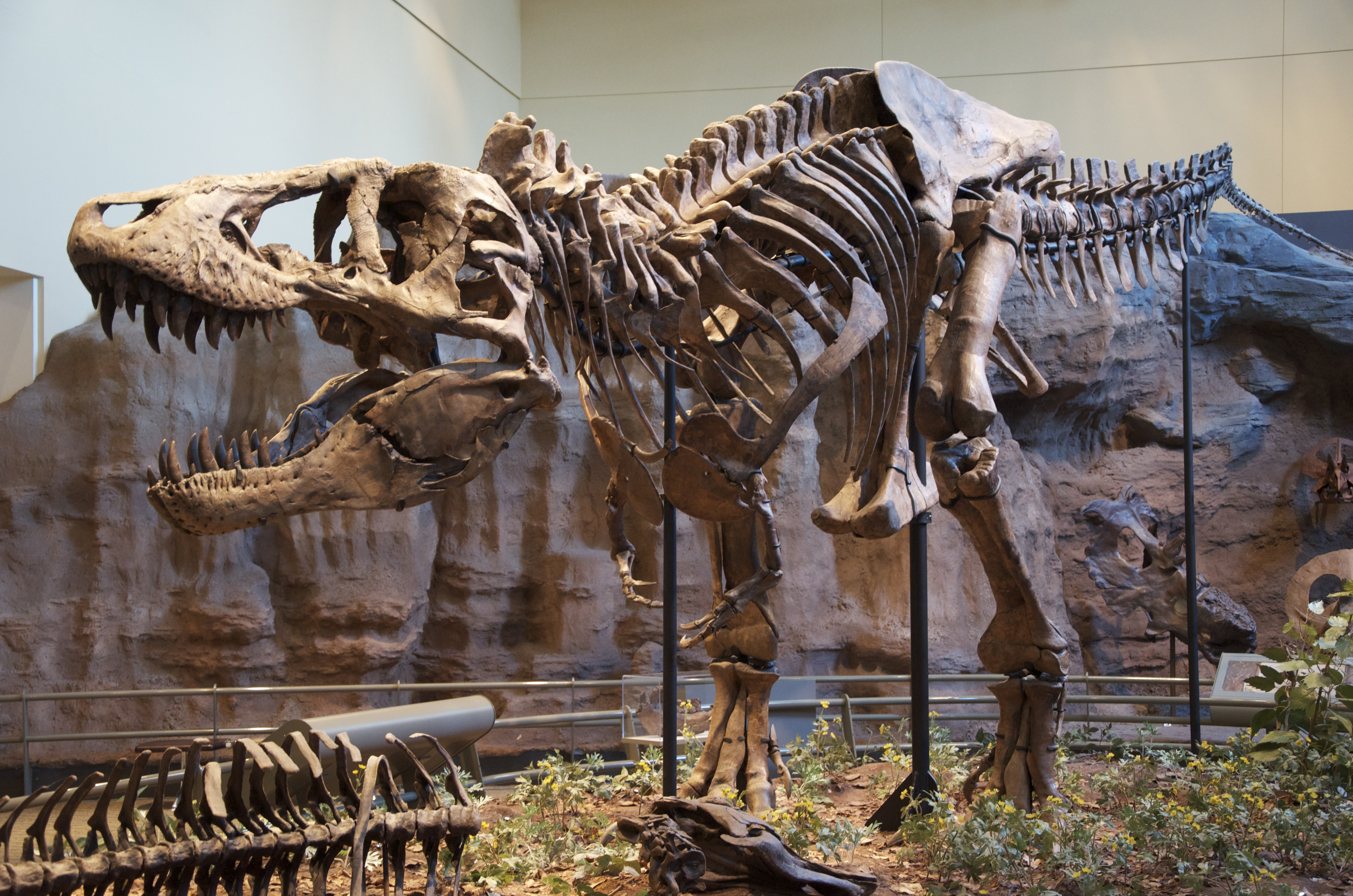
- Fossilized skeleton of the Late Cretaceous tyrannosaur Tyrannosaurus
  †Tyrannosaurus
  - †Tyrannosaurus rex
- †Vascoceras
- Viviparus
- †Volviceramus
- †Walteria – type locality for genus
- †Watinoceras
  - †Watinoceras coloradoense – type locality for species
- †Websteria
- †Xiphactinus
  - †Xiphactinus audax

== Cenozoic ==
=== Selected Cenozoic taxa of Colorado ===
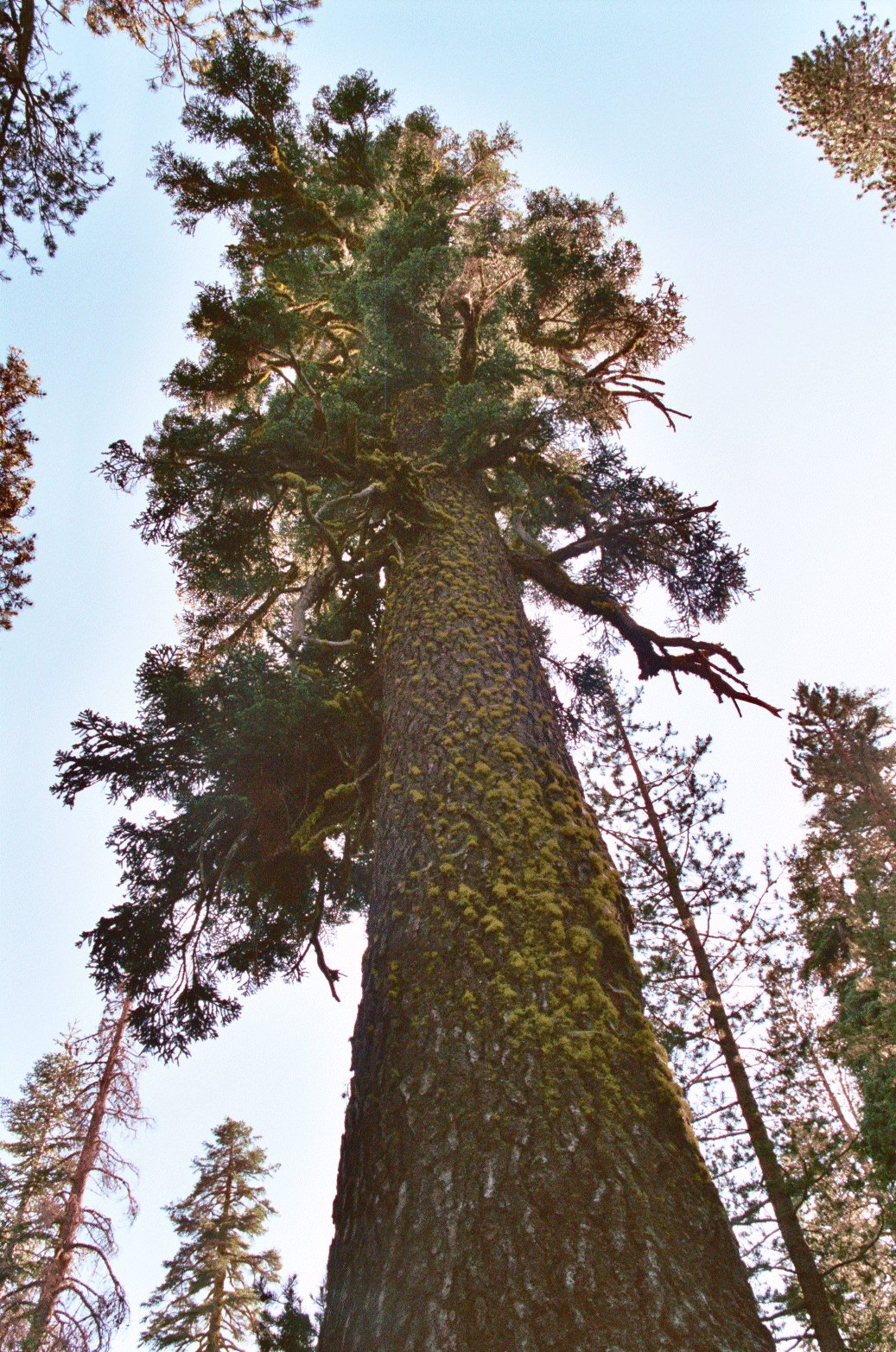
- A living Abies, or fir tree
  Abies
- †Absyrtus
- †Acalles
- Abies
- †Absyrtus
- †Acalles
- Acer
- †Acilius
- Acris
- †Acrostichum
- †Adalia
- †Adelopsyche – type locality for genus
- †Adocus
- Aegialia
- †Aelurodon
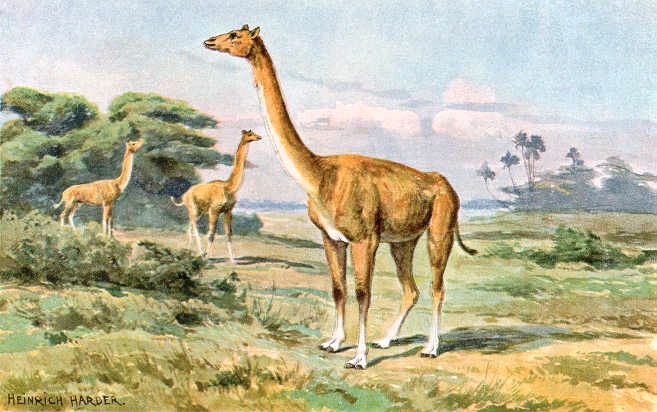
- Life restoration of the Miocene camel Aepycamelus, or the long-necked camel. Heinrich Harder (1920).
  †Aepycamelus
  - †Aepycamelus giraffinus
- †Aeshna
- Agabus
- †Agallia
- †Agathemera
- Agelaius
- †Agnotocastor
- Agrilus
- Agriotes
- †Agromyza
- †Agulla
  - †Agulla protomaculata – type locality for species
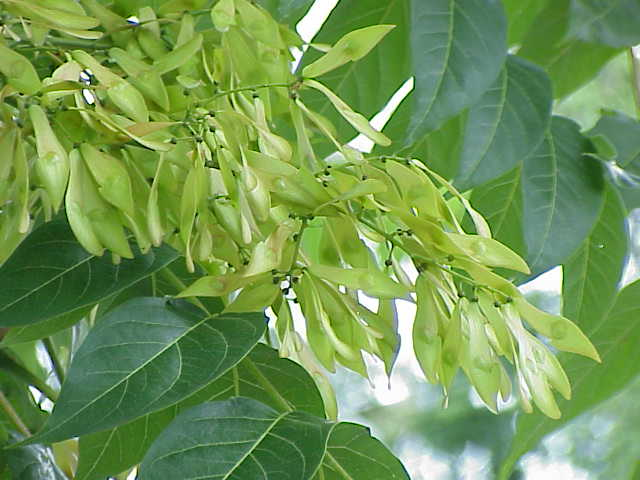
- Foliage and fruits of an Ailanthus tree
  †Ailanthus
- †Aletodon
- Aleurites
- †Alforjas – tentative report
- †Allognathosuchus
- †Allophylus
- Altica
- †Alysia
- Amara
- †Amauropilio
- †Amblycorypha – tentative report
- †Amblyteles
- †Ambystoma
  - †Ambystoma tigrinum
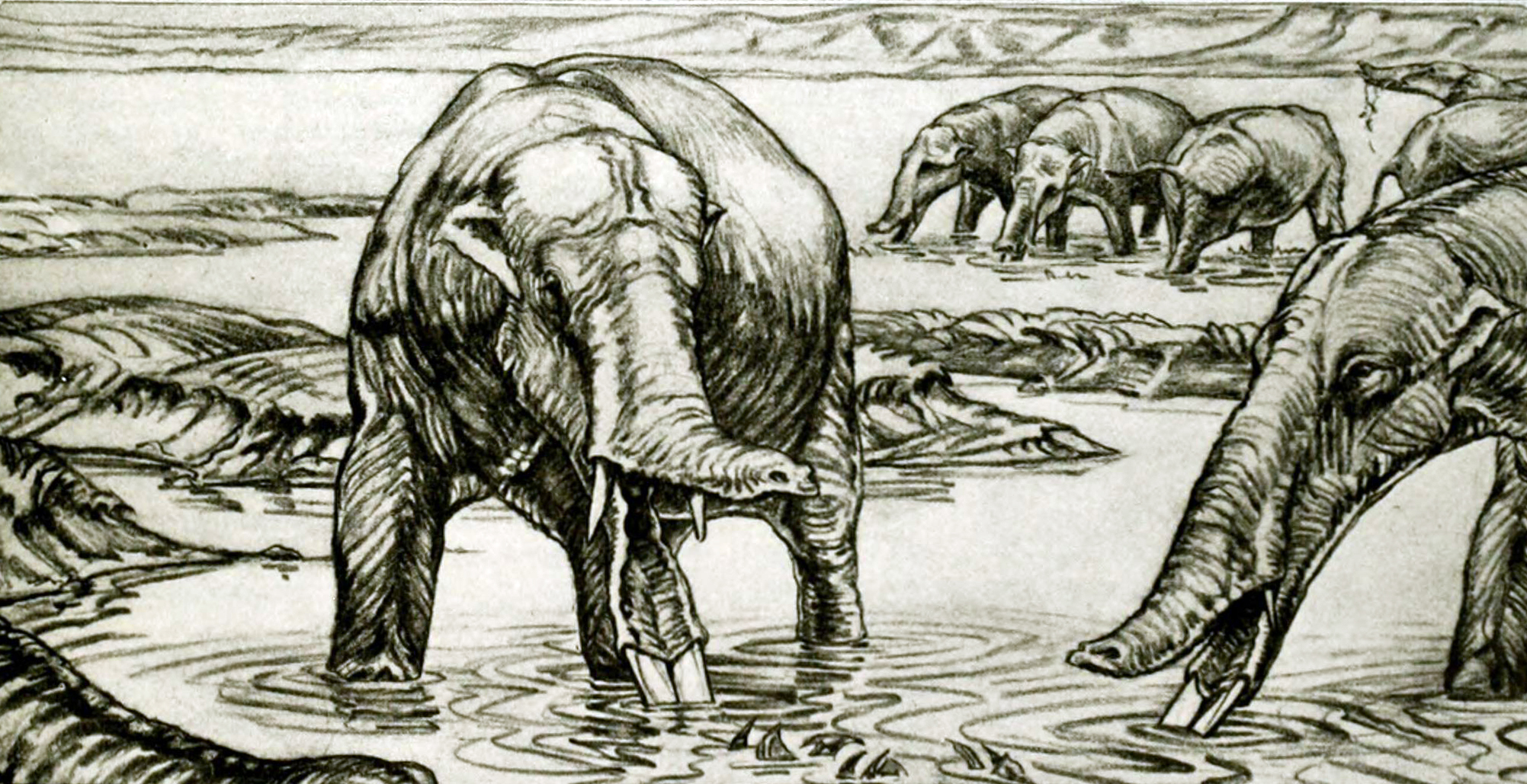
- Life restoration of the Miocene elephant relative Amebelodon. Margret Flinsch (1932).
  †Amebelodon
- Amelanchier
- Amia
- †Ammophila
- †Ampelopsis
- †Amphechinus
- †Amphicerus
- †Amphicyon
  - †Amphicyon galushai
  - †Amphicyon ingens
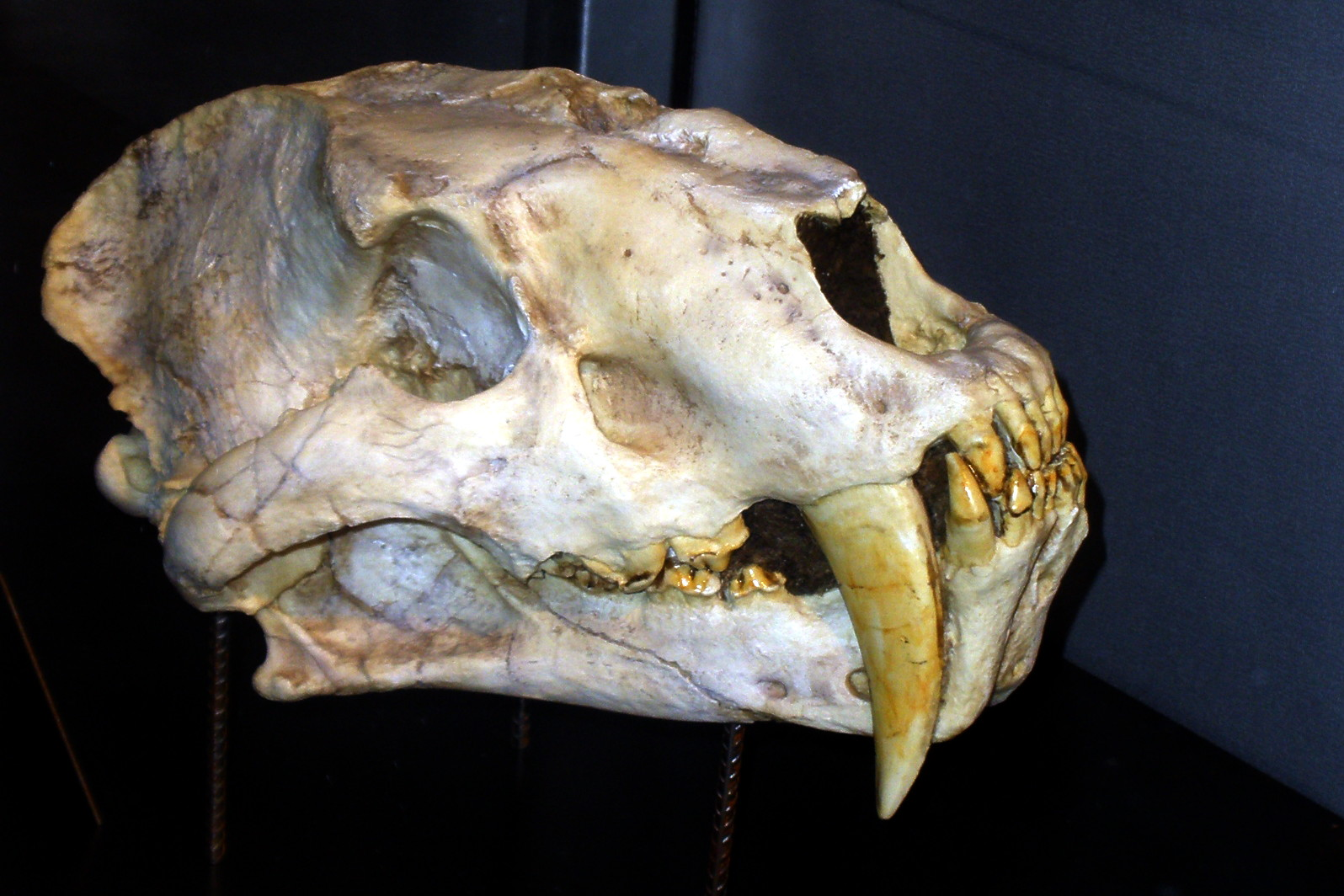
- Fossilized skull of the Miocene saber-toothed cat Amphimachairodus
  †Amphimachairodus
- †Anabrus
- Anas
- †Anasa
- †Anatis
- †Anchitherium
- Andrena
- †Andrias
- †Andricus
- †Anelaphus
- †Anemia
- †Angustidens
- Anisotoma
- †Anobium
- †Anomala
- †Anomalon
- Anser
- †Antas
- Anthaxia
- †Antherophagus
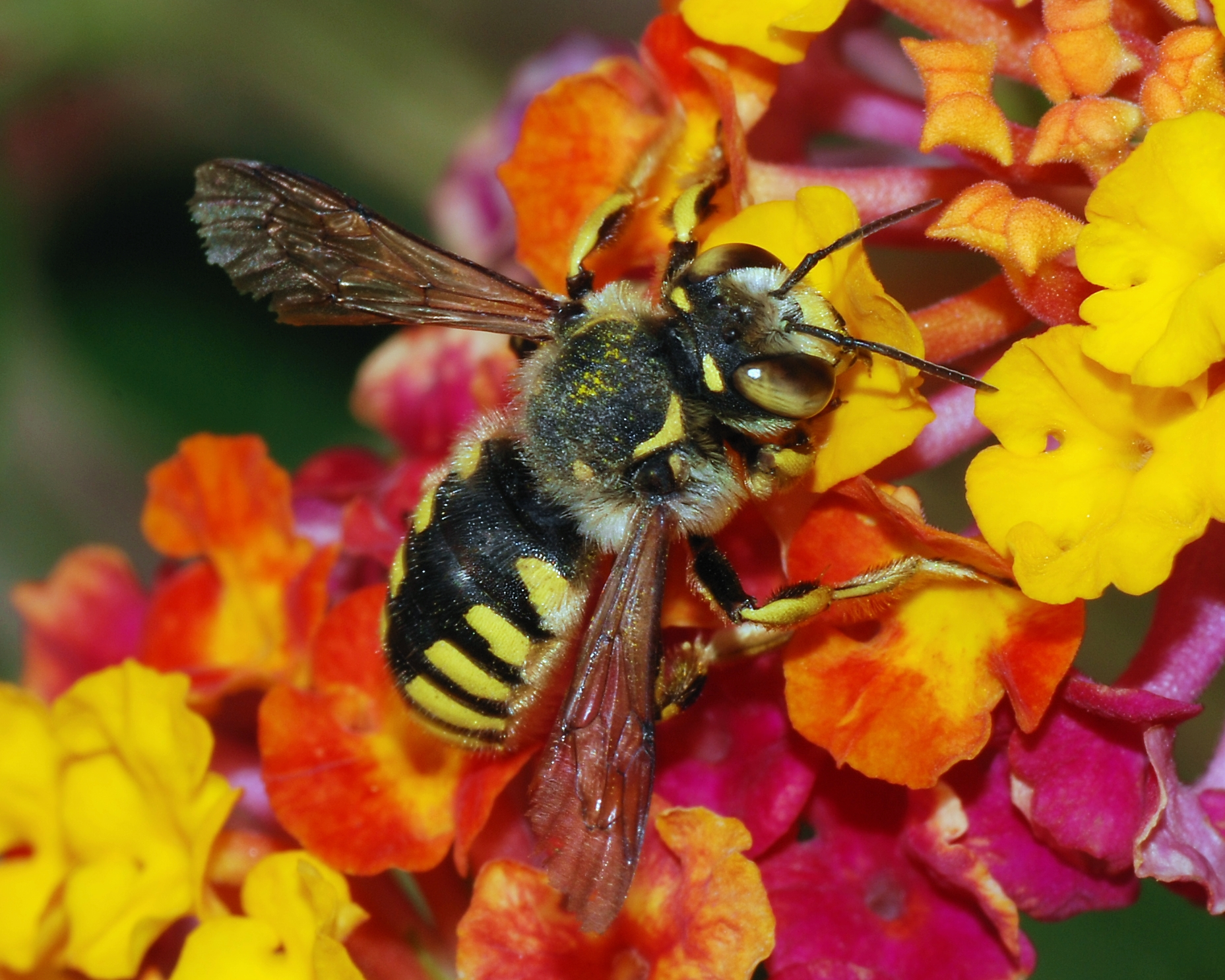
- A living Anthidium, or carder bee
  †Anthidium
  - †Anthidium exhumatum – type locality for species
  - †Anthidium scudderi – type locality for species
- †Anthomyia
- Anthonomus
- †Anthophora
- Antilocapra
  - †Antilocapra americana
- †Antocha
- Aphaenogaster
  - †Aphaenogaster donisthorpei – type locality for species
  - †Aphaenogaster mayri – type locality for species
- †Aphelops
- Aphodius
- Aphrophora
- Apion
- †Apolysis
- Aquila
  - †Aquila chysaetos
- Araneus
- †Archaeotherium
- †Archimyrmex – type locality for genus
  - †Archimyrmex rostratus – type locality for species
- †Archiponera – type locality for genus
  - †Archiponera wheeleri – type locality for species
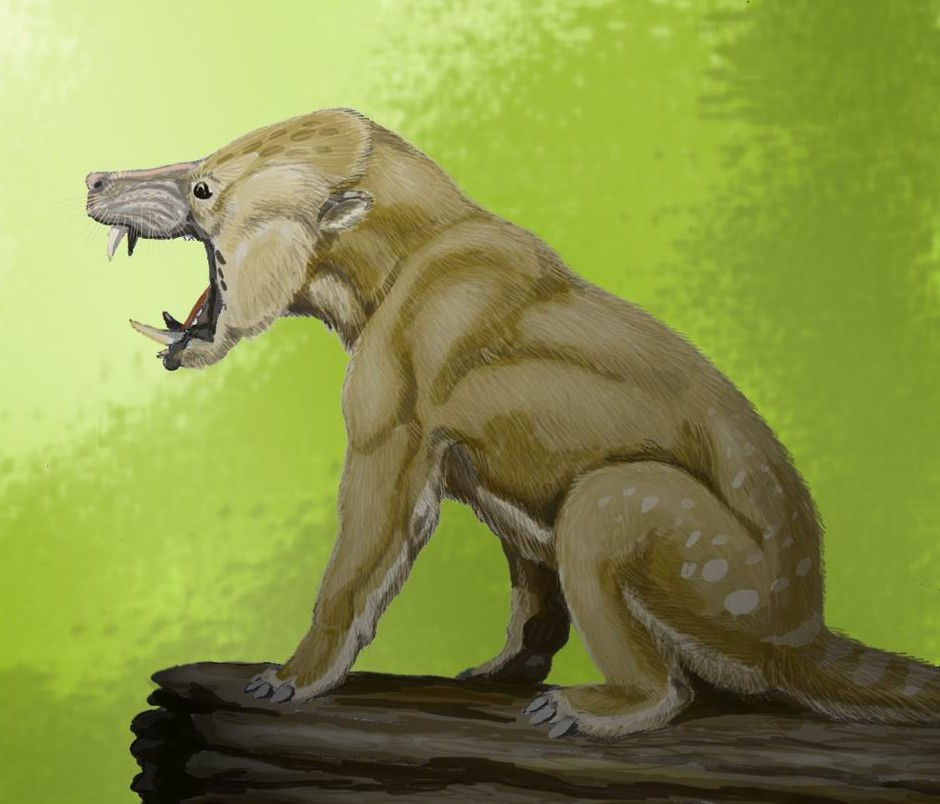
- Life restoration of the Paleocene mammal Arctocyon
  †Arctocyon
- †Argia
- †Arhopalus
- †Aristolochia
- †Artocarpus
- †Asimina
- Asio
- †Asplenium
- †Aster
- †Astronium
- Ataenius
- †Athalia
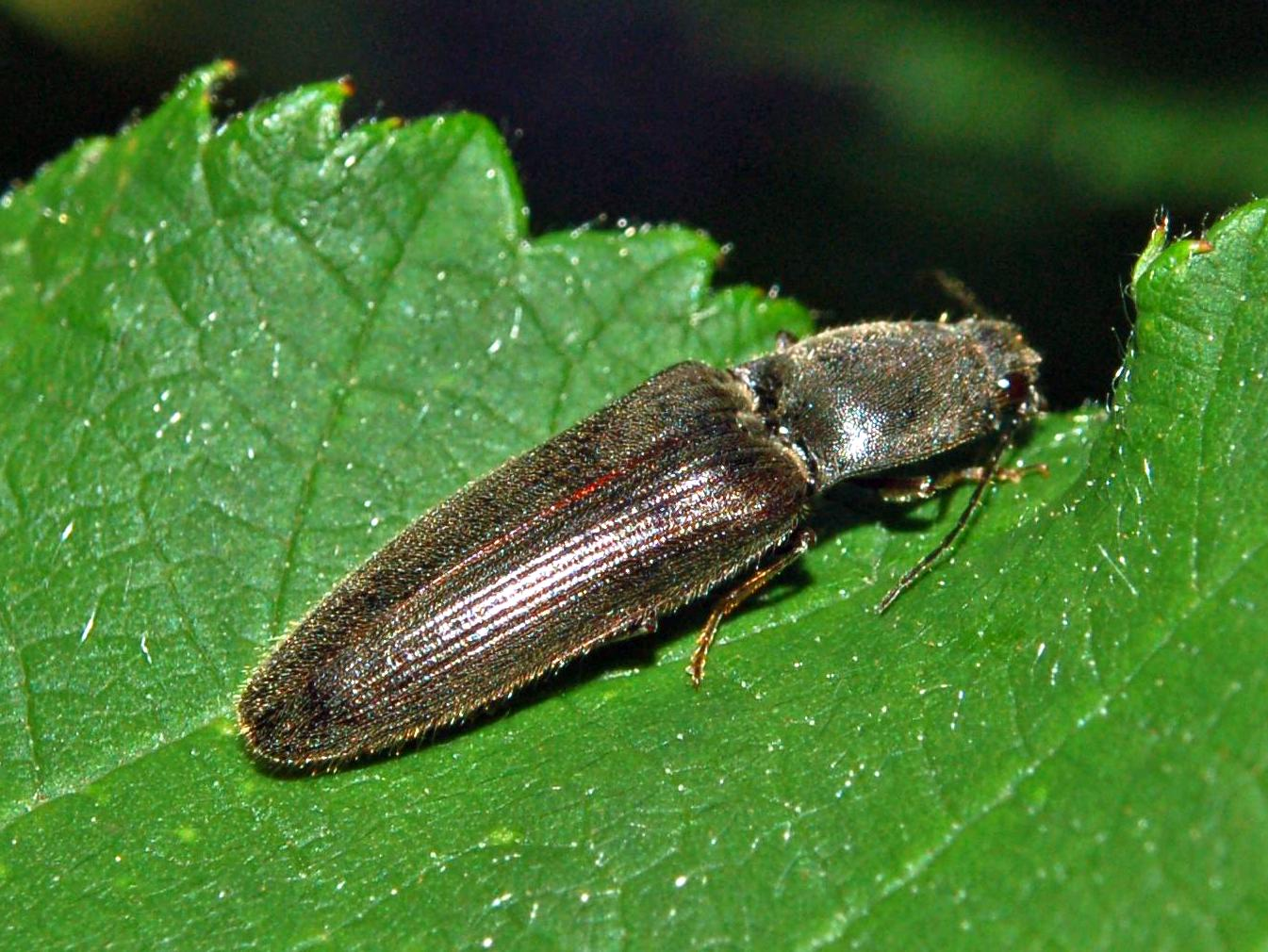
- A living Athous click beetle
  †Athous
- †Athyana
- †Attagenus
- †Auraria – type locality for genus
- Aythya
  - †Aythya affinis
  - †Aythya americana
- †Aztlanolagus
- †Baena
- †Baris
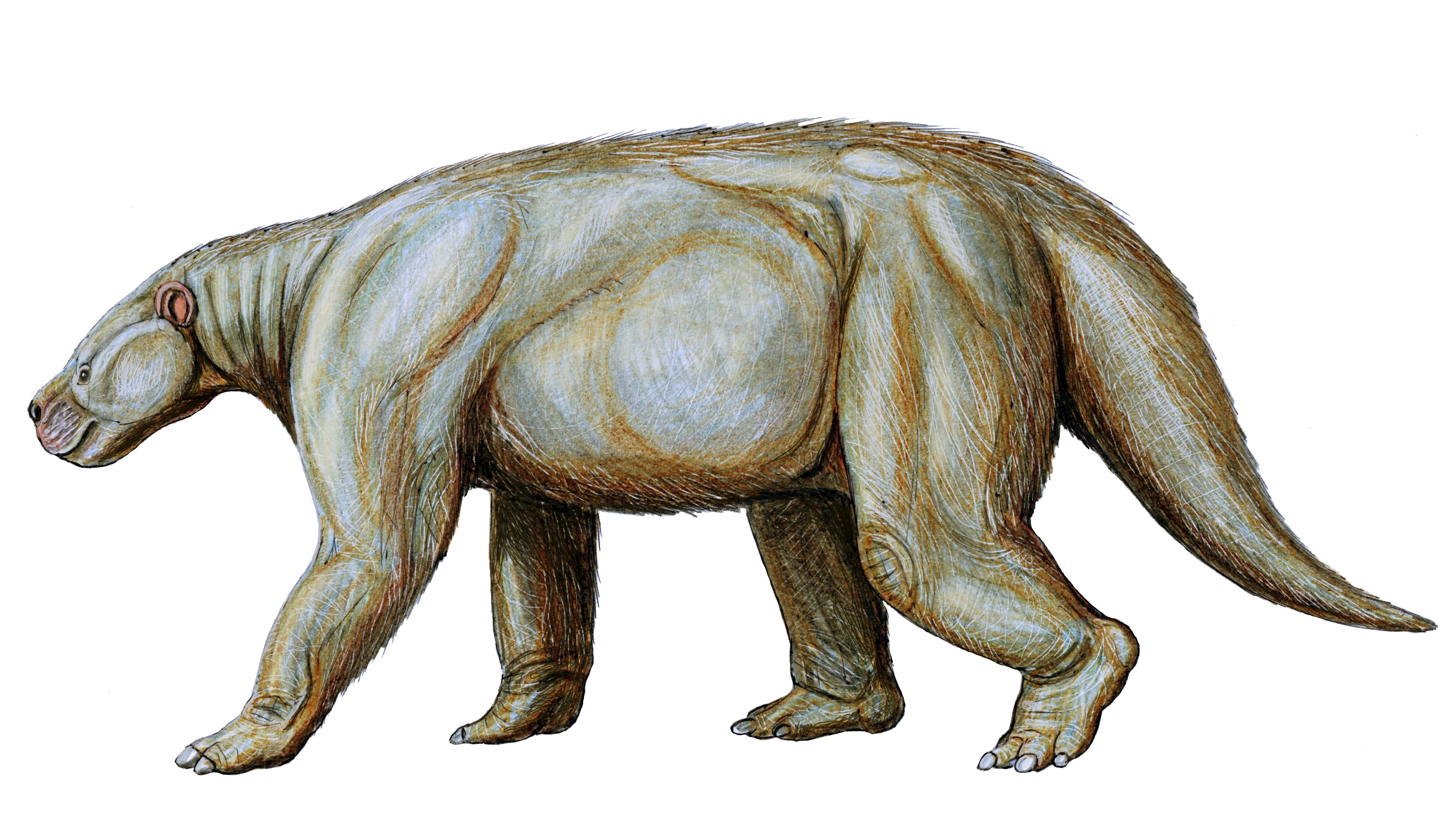
- Life restoration of the Paleocene-Eocene pantodont mammal Barylambda
  †Barylambda
- †Bassus
- †Bathornis – type locality for genus
  - †Bathornis veredus – type locality for species
- †Bathygenys
- †Bathyopsis
- †Belyta
- Bembidion
  - †Bembidion constricticolle
- †Bembidium
- †Beris
- Betula
- Bibio
- †Bibiodes
- †Bidessus
- Bison
  - †Bison antiquus – or unidentified comparable form
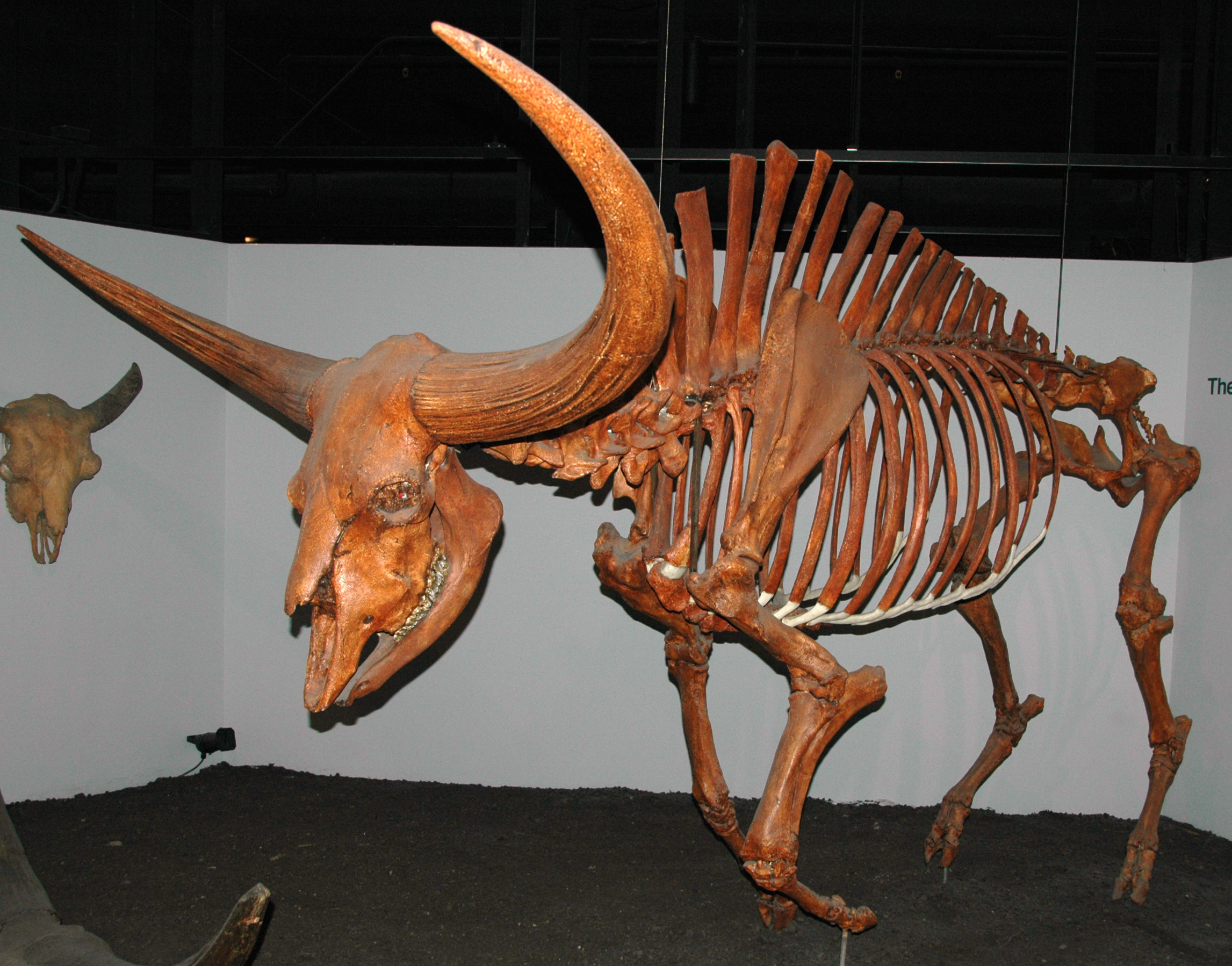
  - Mounted fossilized skeleton of the Pleistocene Bison latifrons, or long-horned bison
    †Bison latifrons
- †Blechnum
- Bledius
- Boletina
- †Borealosuchus
- †Borophagus
  - †Borophagus pugnator
- †Brachinus
- †Brachycrus
- Brachylagus
- †Brachyprotoma
  - †Brachyprotoma obtusata
- †Brachypsalis
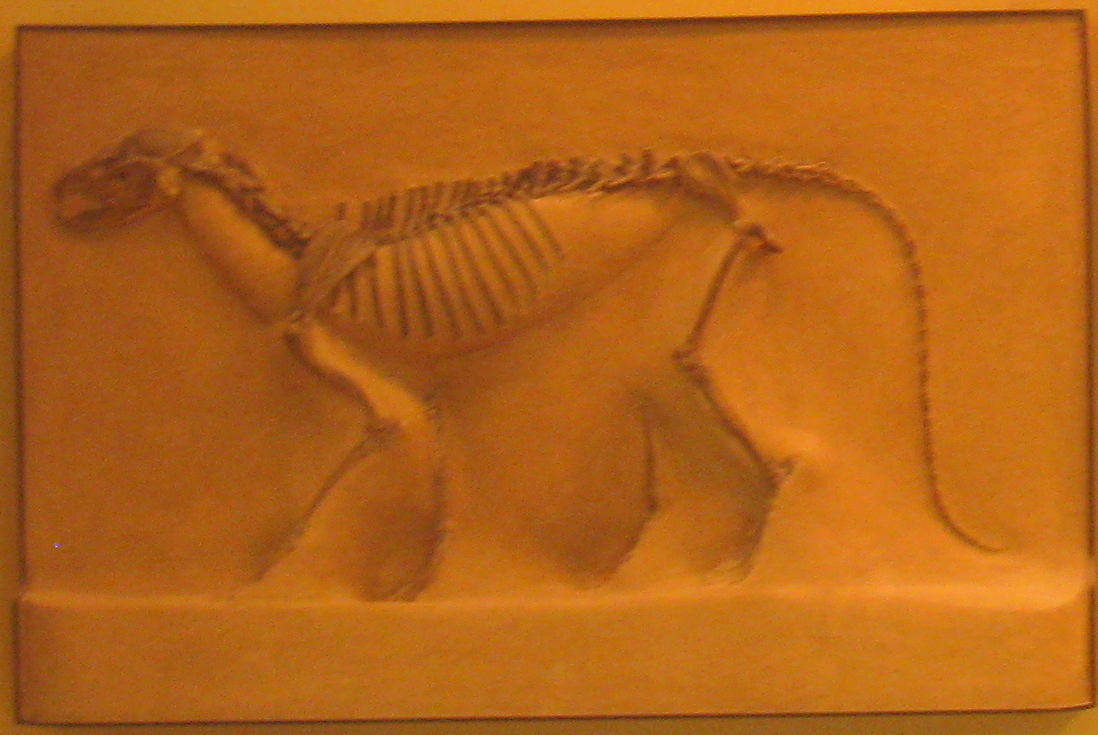
- Skeletal reconstruction of the Eocene-Oligocene bear-dog Brachyrhynchocyon
  †Brachyrhynchocyon
- †Brachyspathus – type locality for genus
- Bracon
- †Bruchus
- Bubo
  - †Bubo virginianus
- Bufo
  - †Bufo cognatus
  - †Bufo woodhousei
- †Buprestis
- †Bursera
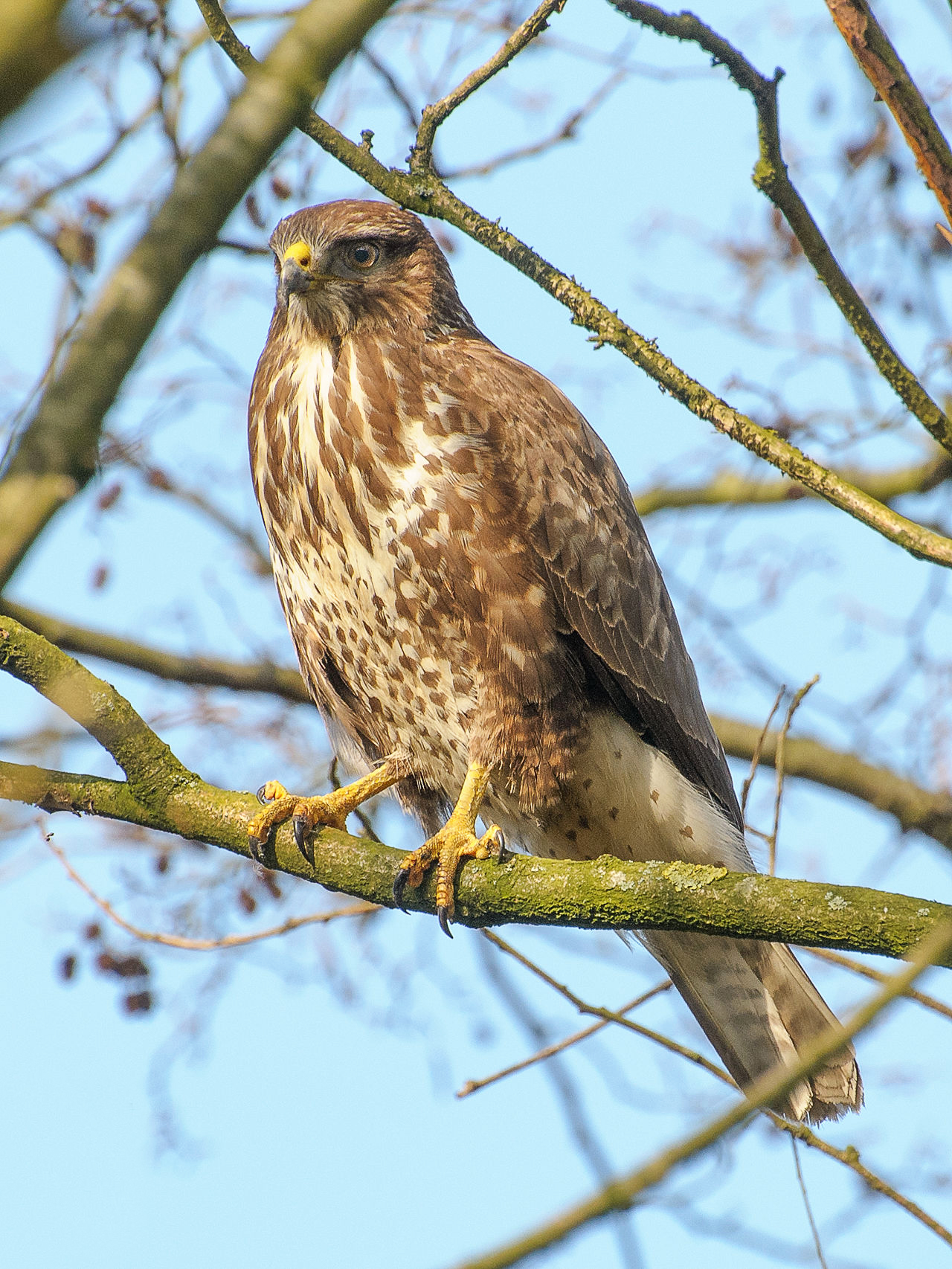
- A living Buteo hawk
  Buteo
- †Caesalpinia
- †Calcarius
  - †Calcarius lapponicus
  - †Calcarius ornatus
- †Calippus
- †Caliroa
- †Callimoxys
- †Callomyia – tentative report
- Calosoma
- †Calyptapis – type locality for genus
  - †Calyptapis florissantensis – type locality for species
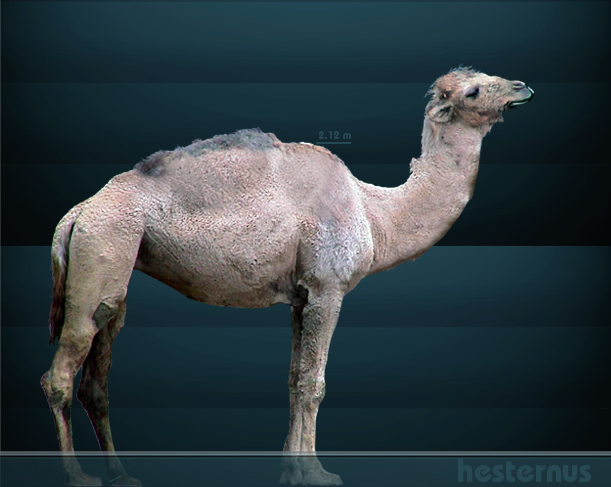
- Life restoration of the Pliocene-Holocene camel Camelops
  †Camelops
  - †Camelops hesternus
- Camponotus
- Canis
  - †Canis edwardii – or unidentified comparable form
  - †Canis latrans
- †Cantius
  - †Cantius abditus
  - †Cantius frugivorus
  - †Cantius mckennai
  - †Cantius ralstoni
- †Capnobotes
- †Capsus
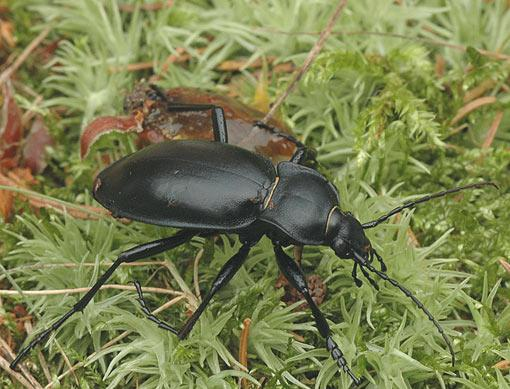
- A living Carabus ground beetle
  Carabus
- †Cardiophorus
- †Cardiospermum
- †Carpocyon
- Carpodacus
  - †Carpodacus cassinii
- †Carpophilus
- Carya
- Castanea
- †Catopsalis
  - †Catopsalis alexanderi – type locality for species
- †Cecidomyia – tentative report
- Cedrela
- †Celastrus
- Celtis
- †Centron – type locality for genus
- †Ceratina
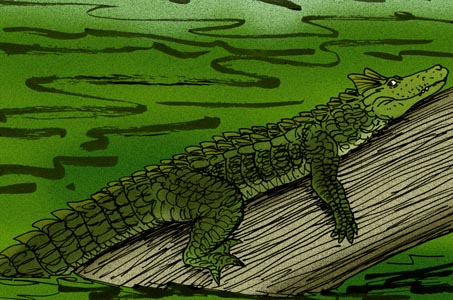
- Life restoration of the Paleocene-Eocene crocodilian Ceratosuchus
  †Ceratosuchus – type locality for genus
  - †Ceratosuchus burdoshi – type locality for species
- †Ceraturgus
- Cercidiphyllum
- Cercis
- †Cercocarpus
- †Cercopis
- Cervus
  - †Cervus elaphus
- Ceutorhynchus
- Chaetodipus
  - †Chaetodipus hispidus
- †Chalcis
- †Chalybion
- †Chamaecyparis
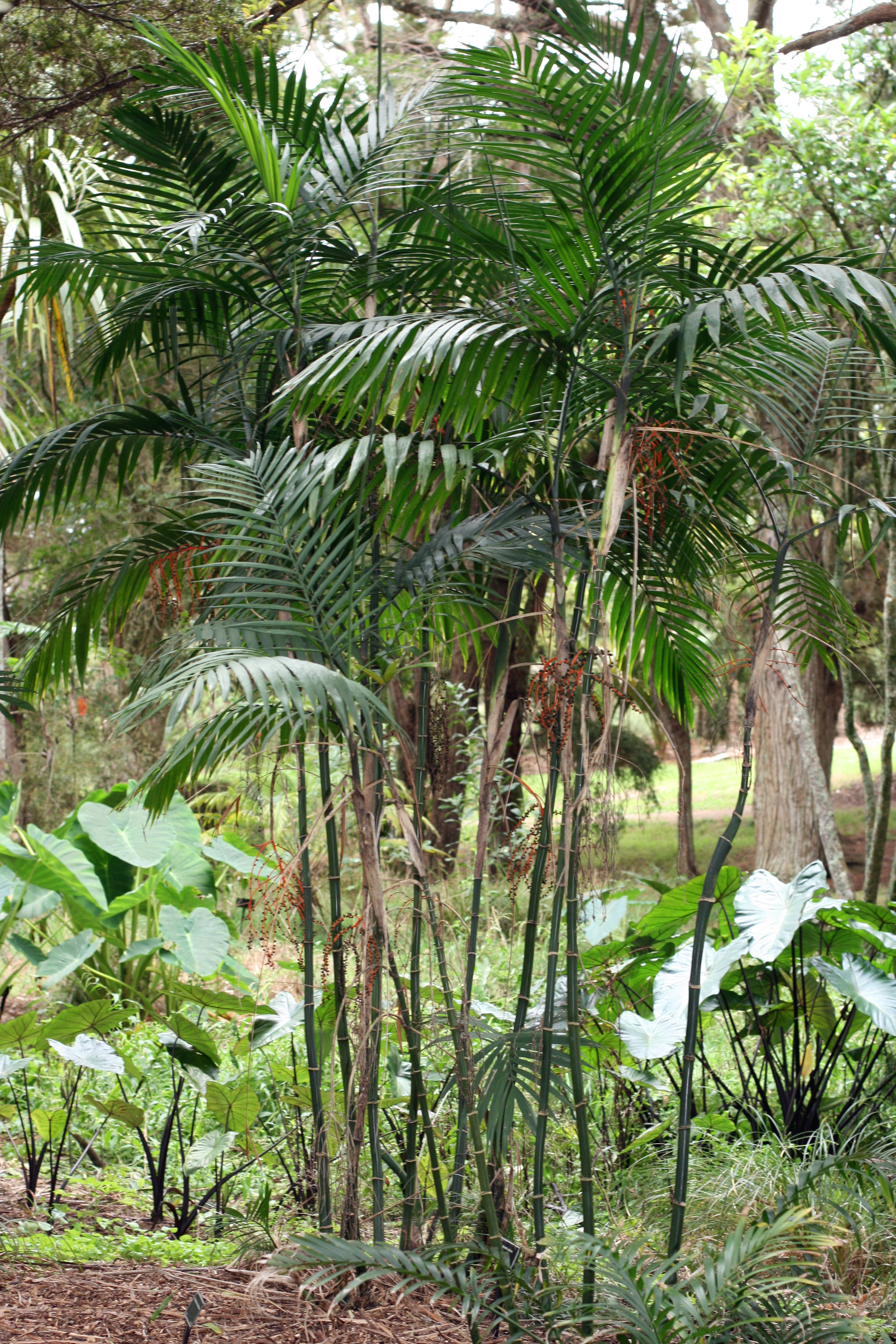
- A stand of living Chamaedorea palms
  †Chamaedorea
- Charina
- †Chauliognathus
- Cheilosia
- †Chelonus
- †Chilocorus
- †Chionaemopsis – type locality for genus
- Chironomus
- Chondestes
  - †Chondestes grammacus
- †Chriacus
- †Chrysis
- †Chrysobothris
- †Chrysogaster
- Chrysomela
- †Cicada
- †Cicadella
- †Cimbex
- †Cimexomys
  - †Cimexomys arapahoensis – type locality for species
  - †Cimexomys minor
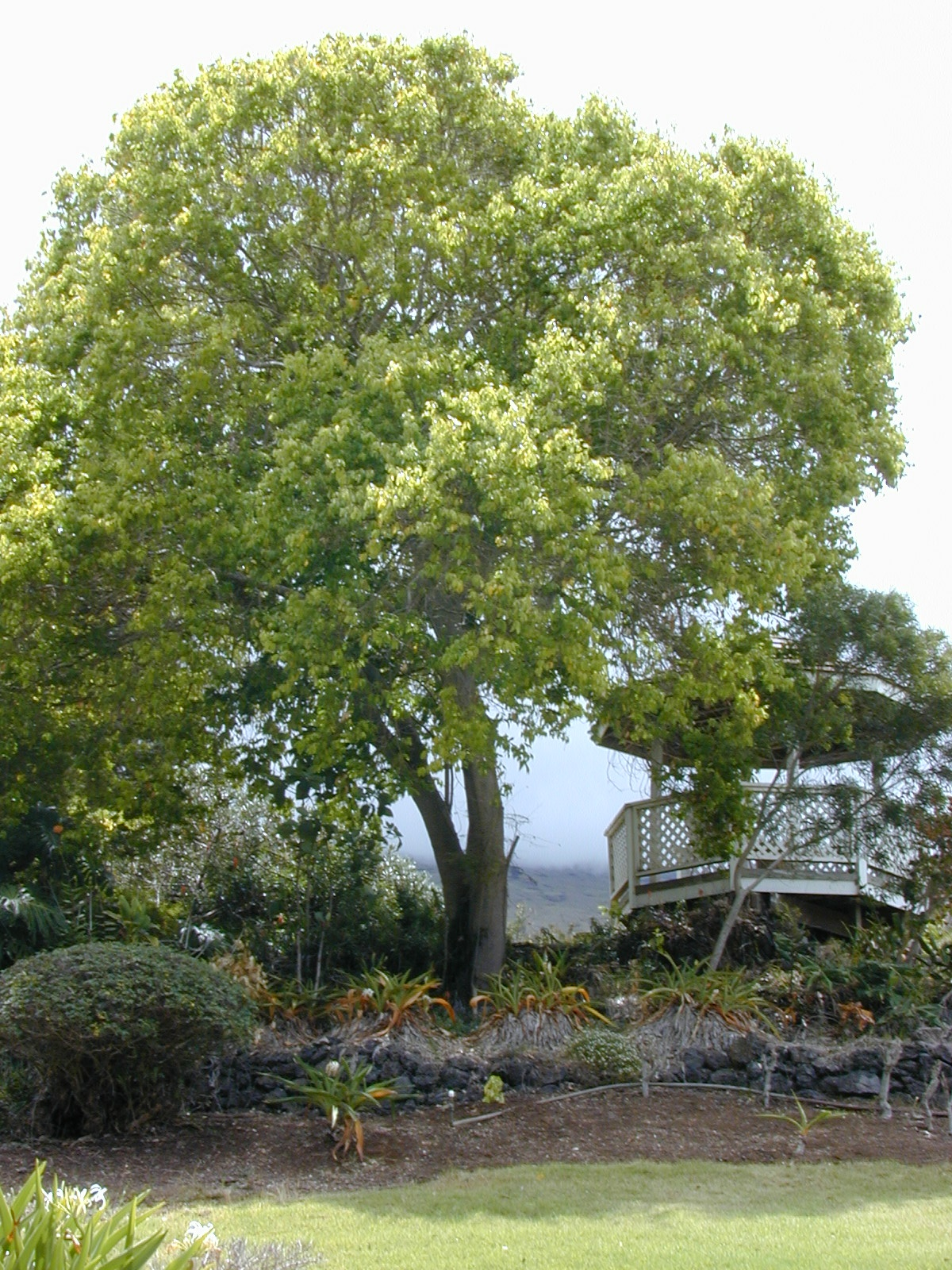
- A living Cinnamomum, or cinnamon tree
  Cinnamomum
- Cissus
- †Cixius – tentative report
- †Cladius
- †Cladura
- †Clastoptera
- †Cleonus
- †Closterocoris
  - †Closterocoris elegans – type locality for species
- †Clubiona
- †Clytus
- †Coccinella
- †Coeliodes
- Colaptes
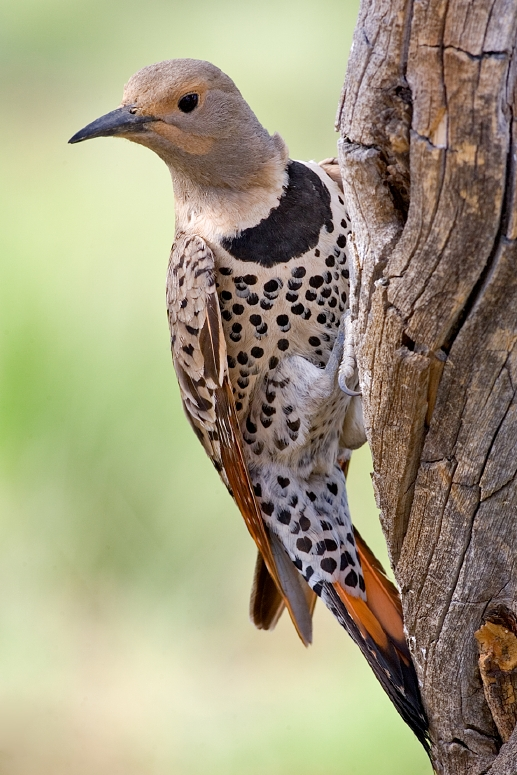
  - A living Colaptes auratus, or northern flicker
    †Colaptes auratus
- †Colaspis
- †Collops
- †Colopterus
- †Colubrina
- †Compsemys
- †Coniatus
- Conotelus
  - †Conotelus obscurus
- †Conotrachelus
- †Conzattia
- †Copecion
- †Copelemur
- †Copidita
- Corixa
- †Corizus
- †Cormocyon
- †Cormohipparion
- Cornus
- Corticaria
- Corvus
  - †Corvus brachyrhynchos
  - †Corvus corax
- †Corylus
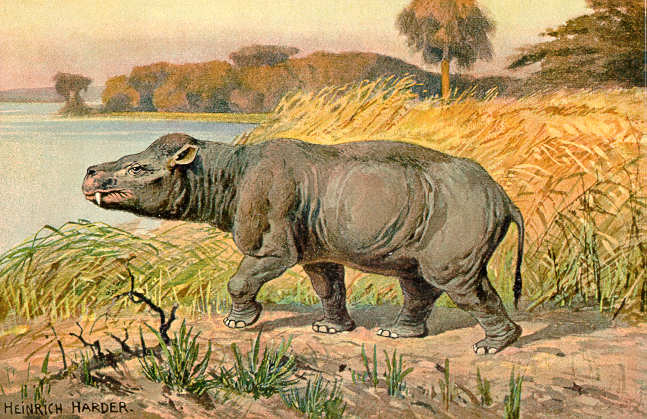
- Life restoration of the Paleocene-Eocene pantodont mammal Coryphodon. Heinrich Harder (1920).
  †Coryphodon
- Cossonus
- †Cotinus
- †Crabro
- †Cratacanthus
- Crataegus
- Crotalus
  - †Crotalus viridis
- †Croton
- †Cryptocephalus
- †Cryptocheilus
- Cryptophagus
- Cryptorhynchus
- †Cryptus
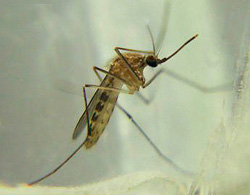
- A living Culex mosquito
  Culex
- †Curculio
- †Cuterebra
- †Cyclotrachelus
- †Cydamus
- †Cylindrotoma
- †Cynarctoides
  - †Cynarctoides acridens
- †Cynelos
- Cynomys
- †Cyphomyia
- †Cypris
- †Daphne
- Daphnia
- Life restoration of the Eocene-Miocene bear dog Daphoenus
  †Daphoenus
- †Davidia
- †Denaeaspis – type locality for genus
  - †Denaeaspis chelonopsis – type locality for species
- †Dennstaedtia
- †Dermatobia
- †Dermestes
- †Diabrotica
- †Diacodexis
- †Dialysis
- Diamesa
- †Dianthidium
- †Diceratherium
- †Dicerca
- Dicranomyia
- †Dicranota
- †Dictyla
- †Didymictis
- †Didymosphaeria
- †Dilophodon
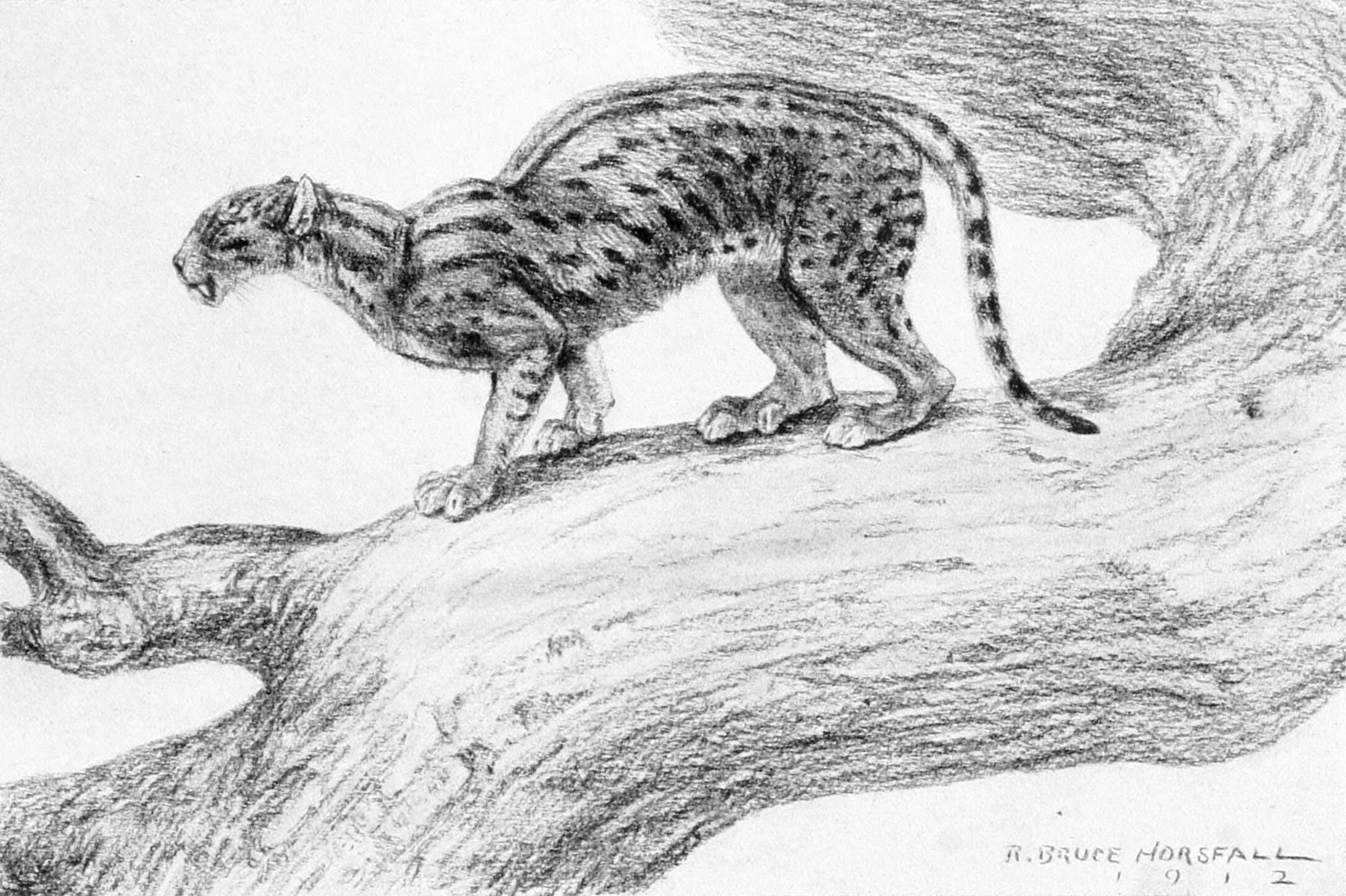
- Life restoration of the Eocene-Miocene false saber-toothed cat Dinictis. Robert Bruce Horsfall (1913).
  †Dinictis
- †Dinohippus
- †Dioctria
- Dioscorea
- †Diploptera
- Diplotaxis – tentative report
- Diplotaxis
- Dipodomys
  - †Dipodomys ordii
- Dipteronia
- †Dissacus
- †Docimus – type locality for genus
- Dodonaea
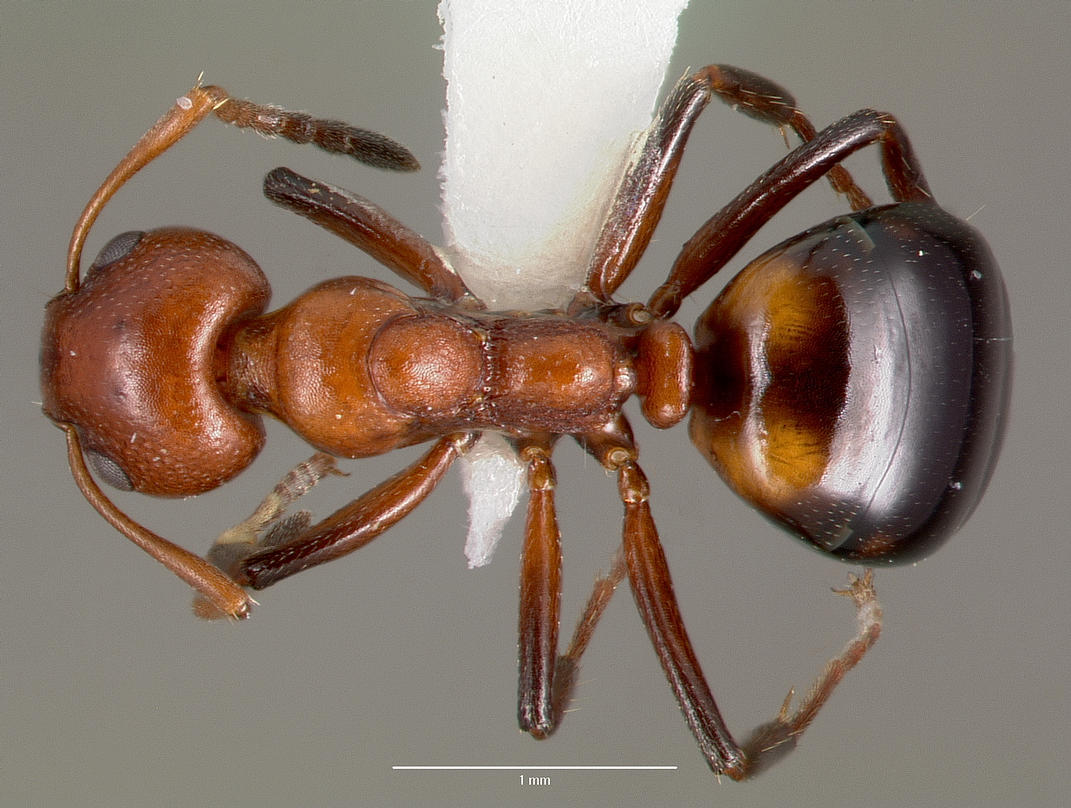
- Preserved Dolichoderus ant
  Dolichoderus
  - †Dolichoderus antiquus – type locality for species
  - †Dolichoderus kohlsi – type locality for species
  - †Dolichoderus rohweri – type locality for species
- †Dominickus – type locality for genus
  - †Dominickus castnioides – type locality for species
- †Domnina
- Donacia
- Dorytomus
- †Doxocopa
- †Drassonax
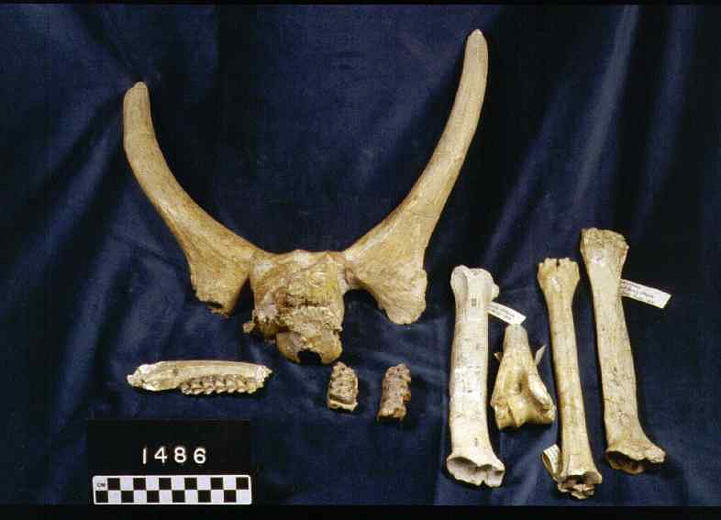
- Fossilized horns, jaws, and limb bones of the Miocene deer relative Dromomeryx
  †Dromomeryx
  - †Dromomeryx borealis – type locality for species
- †Dryobius
- Dryopteris
- Dyschirius
- †Dysdercus
- †Echmatemys
- †Ectobius
- †Ectocion
- †Ectoconus
- †Elaeomyrmex – type locality for genus
  - †Elaeomyrmex coloradensis – type locality for species
  - †Elaeomyrmex gracilis – type locality for species
- †Elaphidion
- Elaphropus
- †Elater
- Eleodes
- †Emiliana – type locality for genus
  - †Emiliana alexandri – type locality for species
- †Empis
- †Enallagma
- Engelhardia
- Enochrus
- †Entimus
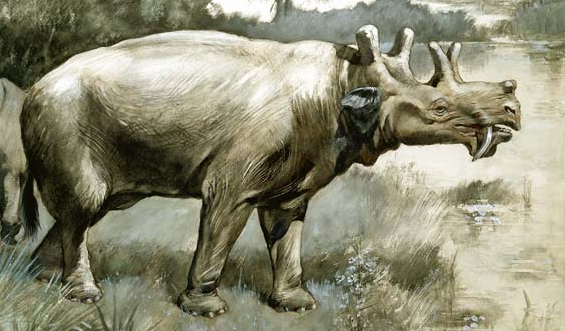
- Life restoration of a pair of the Eocene uintathere mammal Eobasileus. Charles R. Knight (1890s).
  †Eobasileus
  - †Eobasileus cornutus
- †Eocuculus – type locality for genus
- †Eogryllus
- †Eohippus
  - †Eohippus angustidens
- †Eosacantha – type locality for genus
  - †Eosacantha delocranioides – type locality for species
- †Eotitanops
- Ephedra
- †Ephemera
- †Epicaerus
- Epicauta
- †Epicyon
  - †Epicyon haydeni
- †Epihippus
- Epuraea
- †Epyris
- †Equisetum
- Equus
  - †Equus conversidens
  - †Equus francisci
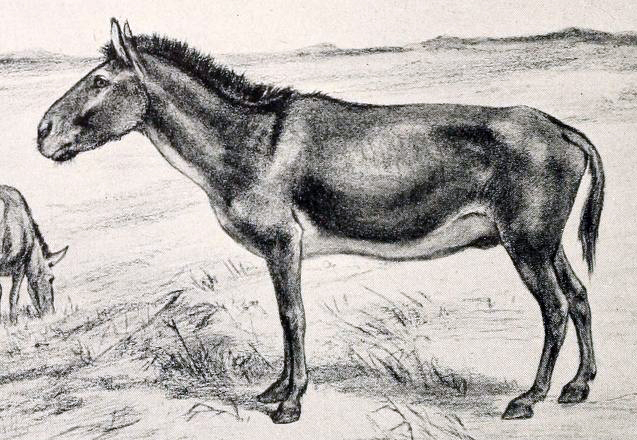
  - Restoration of the Pliocene-Holocene horse Equus scotti, or Scott's horse
    †Equus scotti – or unidentified comparable form
  - †Equus simplicidens
- Eremophila
  - †Eremophila alpestris
- Erethizon
- Eriocampa
- †Eriophyes – tentative report
- †Eristalis
- †Ernobius
- †Ethmia
- †Eubazus
- †Eucnemis
- †Eucommia
- Eugenia
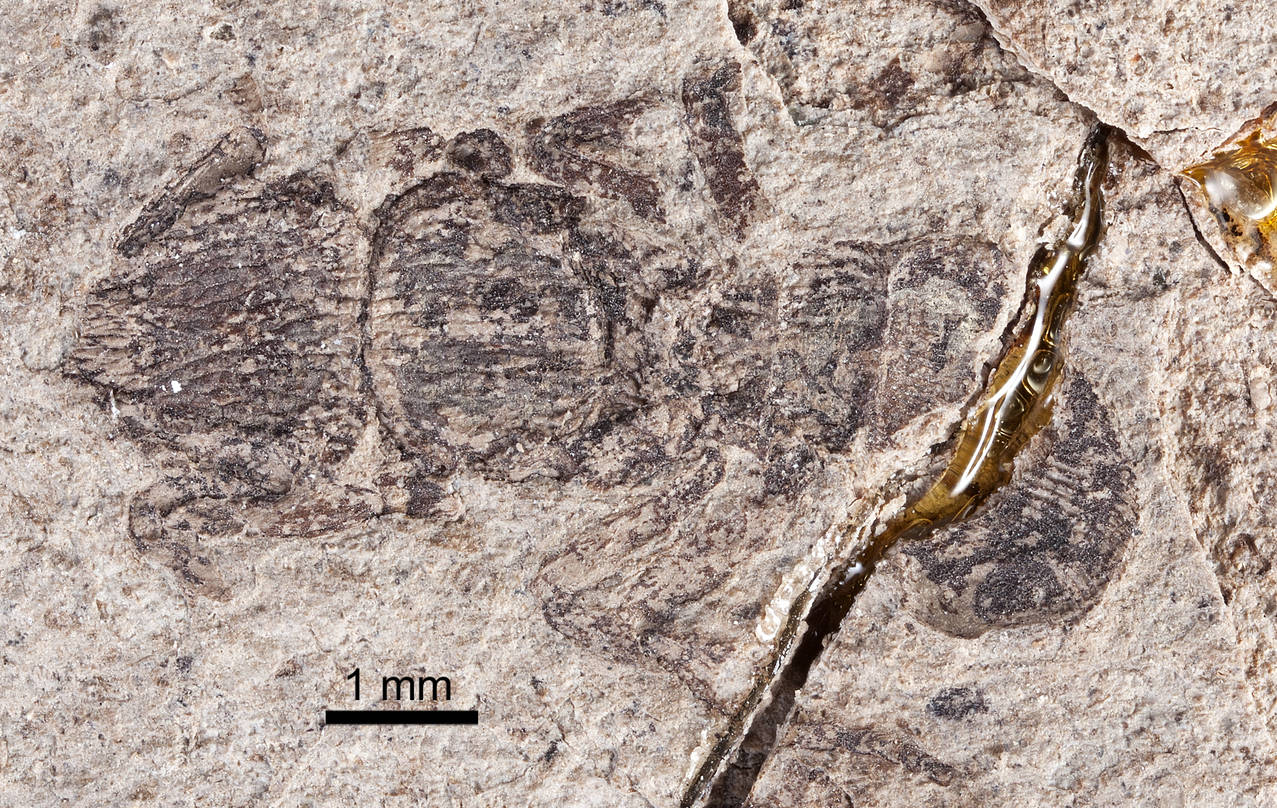
- Fossil of the Eocene ant Eulithomyrmex
  †Eulithomyrmex – type locality for genus
  - †Eulithomyrmex rugosus – type locality for species
  - †Eulithomyrmex striatus – type locality for species
- †Euparius
- Euphorbia
- †Eurytoma
- Eutamias
  - †Eutamias minimus – or unidentified comparable form
- †Exochus
- Fagus
- Falcipennis
- Falco
  - †Falco sparverius
- Ficus
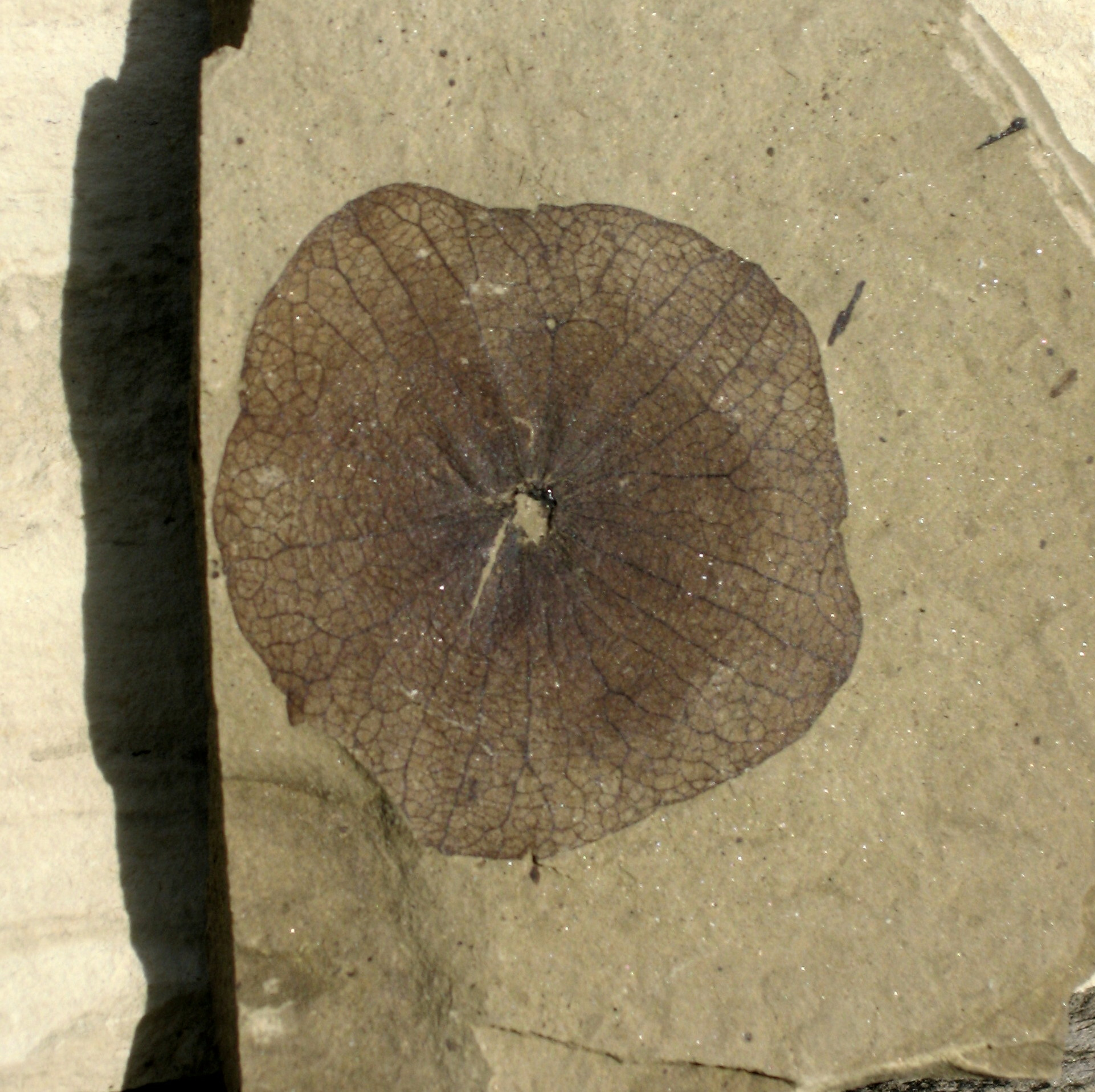
- Fossilized flower of the Eocene-Oligocene mallow relative Florissantia
  †Florissantia – type locality for genus
  - †Florissantoraphidia funerata – type locality for species
- Formica
- †Fornax
- †Fraxinus
- †Fulgora
- †Fulica
  - †Fulica americana
- †Gaurotes
- †Geocoris
- Geomys
  - †Geomys bursarius
- †Geron – tentative report
- Gerris
- †Gigantocamelus
- †Glossina – type locality for genus
- Glyptostrobus
- Gnophomyia
- †Gomphocerus
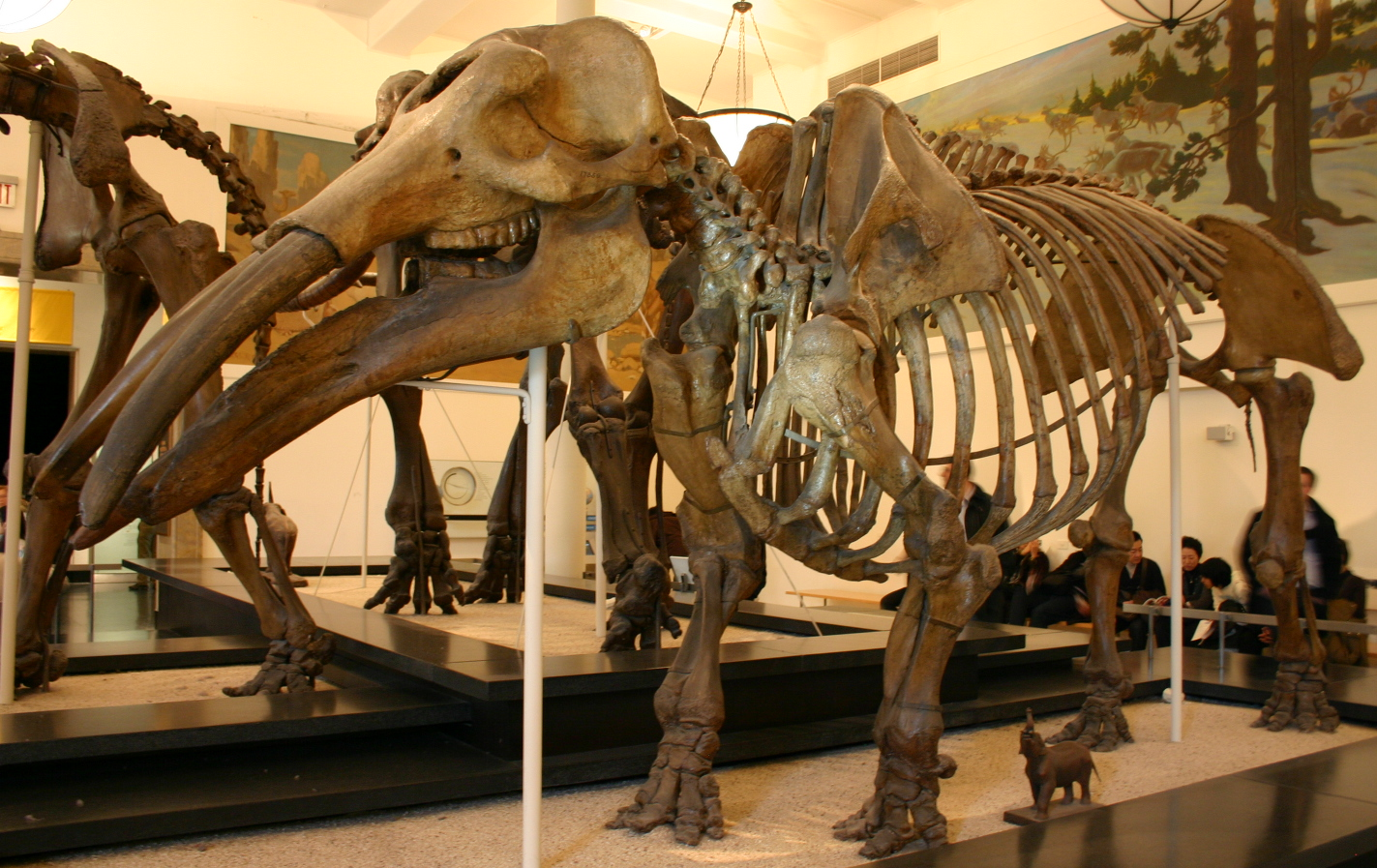
- Mounted fossilized skeleton of the Miocene-Pleistocene elephant relative Gomphotherium
  †Gomphotherium
- †Gorytes
- †Grammoptera
- †Gyaclavator – type locality for genus
  - †Gyaclavator kohlsi – type locality for species
- †Gymnopternus
- †Gymnorhinus
- †Hadrianus
- Halesia
- †Hapalodectes
- †Haplolambda
- Harpalus
- †Helaletes
- †Helichus
- †Hellwigia
- Helophorus
- †Hemiauchenia
  - †Hemiauchenia macrocephala
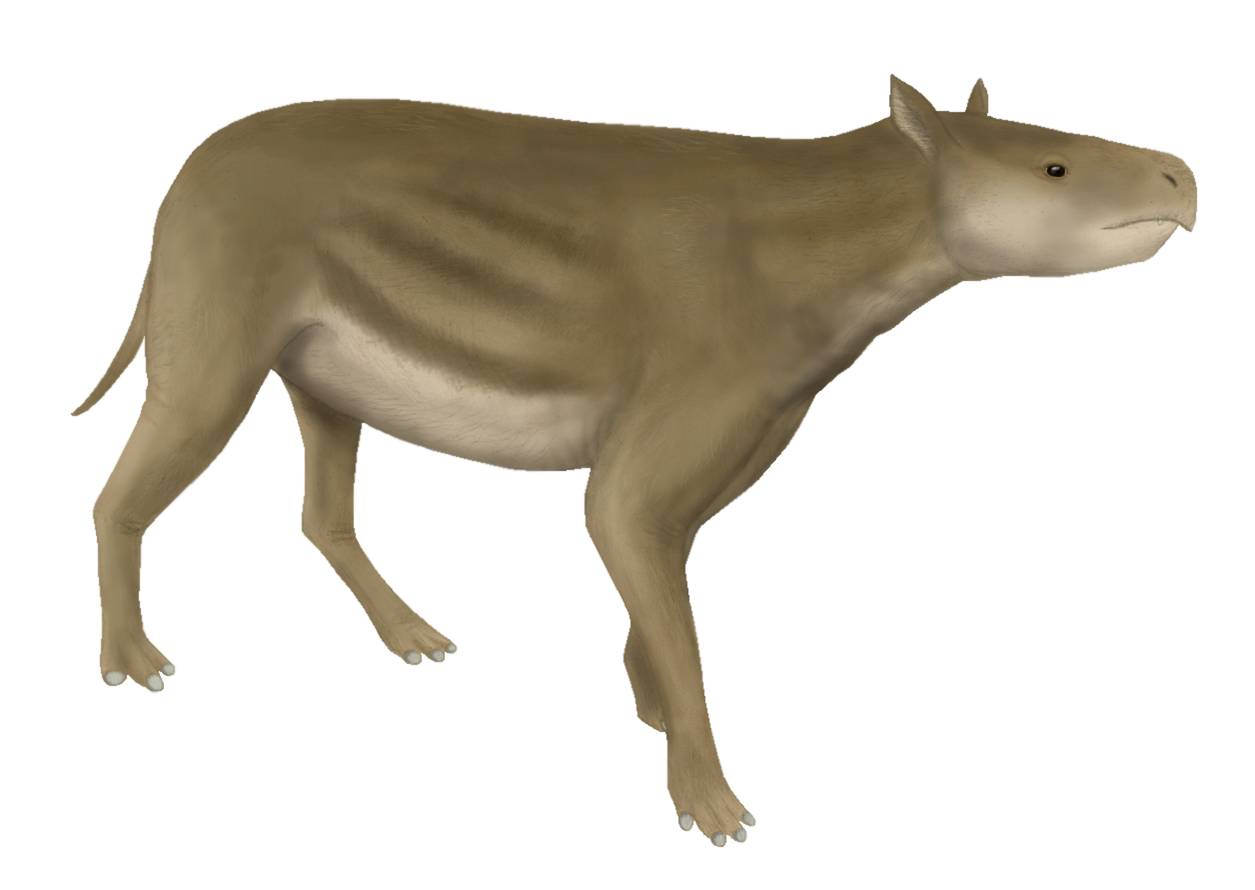
- Life restoration of the Eocene tapir relative Heptodon
  †Heptodon
- †Heriades
- †Herpetotherium
  - †Herpetotherium fugax
  - †Herpetotherium knighti
- Hersiliola
- †Hesperocyon
- Heterodon
  - †Heterodon nasicus
- †Hexerites – type locality for genus
  - †Hexerites primalis – type locality for species
- †Heyderia
- Holbrookia
  - †Holbrookia maculata
- †Holcorpa – type locality for genus
  - †Holcorpa maculosa – type locality for species
- †Homogalax
- †Hoplia
- †Hoplocampa
- †Hoplochelys
- †Humulus
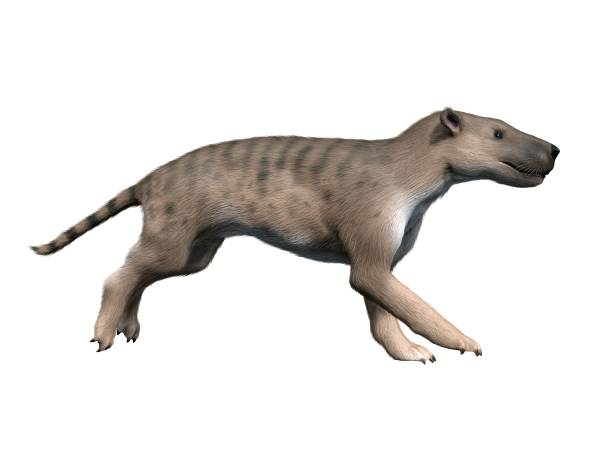
- Life restoration of the Eocene-Miocene creodont mammal Hyaenodon
  †Hyaenodon
  - †Hyaenodon crucians
  - †Hyaenodon horridus
  - †Hyaenodon mustelinus
- †Hydnobius
- Hydrangea
- Hydriomena
- †Hydriomena? protrita – tentative report
- Hydrobius
  - †Hydrobius fuscipes
- †Hydromystria
- Hydrophilus
- Hydroporus
- Hydropsyche
- †Hydroptila
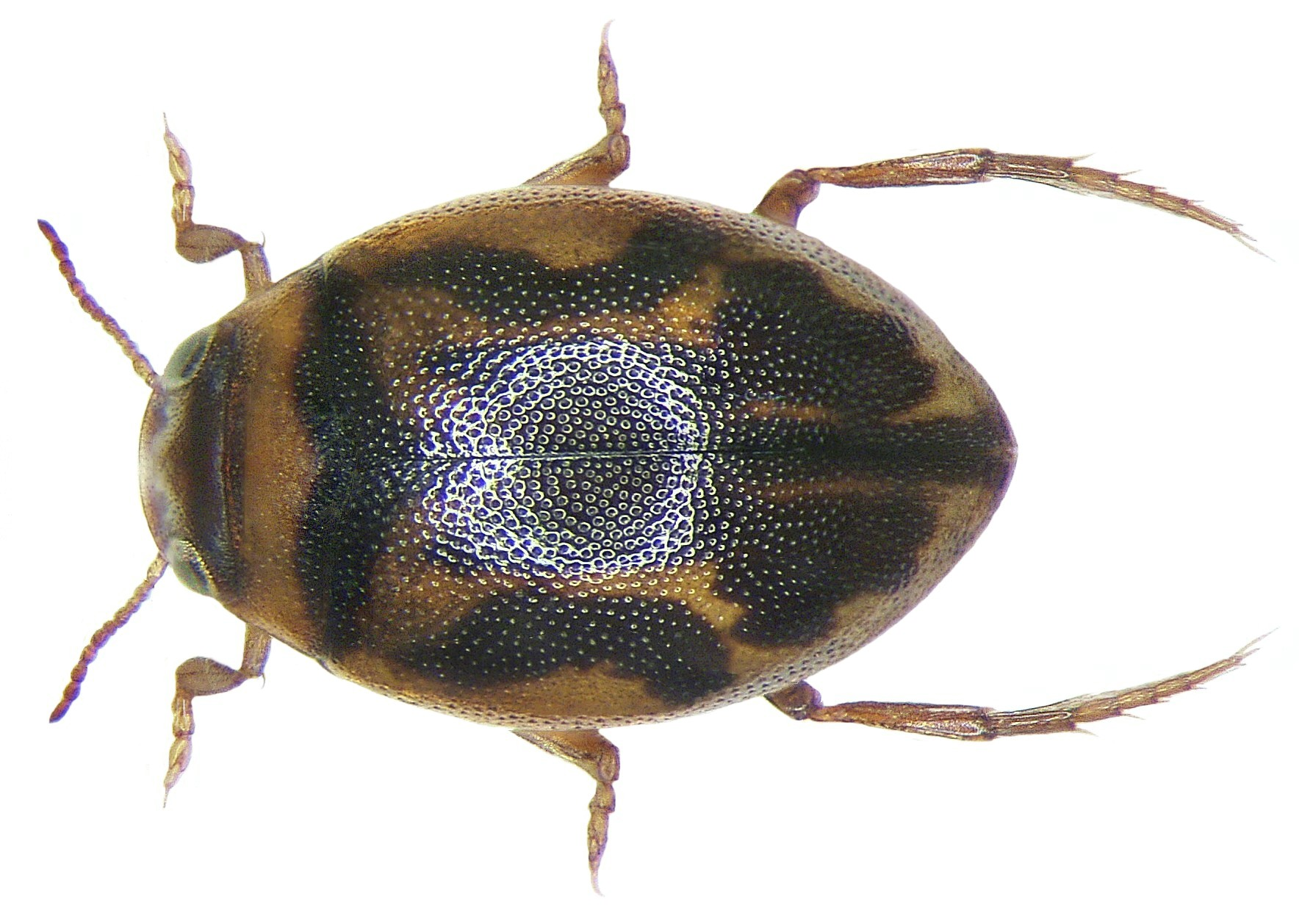
- A living Hygrotus predaceous diving beetle
  Hygrotus
- †Hylobius
- †Hymenophyllum
- †Hyopsodus
- †Hypertragulus
- †Hypisodus
- †Hypohippus
- †Hypolagus
- †Hyporhina
  - †Hyporhina galbreathi – type locality for species
- †Hyrachyus
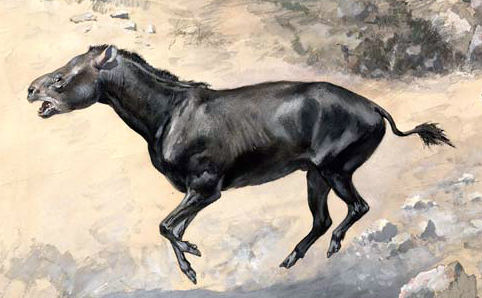
- Life restoration of the Eocene-Oligocene odd-toed ungulate Hyracodon. Charles R. Knight (1896).
  †Hyracodon
- †Hyracotherium
  - †Hyracotherium vasacciense
- †Ichneumon
- Ilex
- †Indusia
- †Iridomyrmex
  - †Iridomyrmex florissantius – type locality for species
  - †Iridomyrmex obscurans – type locality for species
- †Ischyromys
- †Isomira
- †Isothea – type locality for genus
- †Isotrilophus
- †Iulus
- †Jadera
- †Janus
- Jassus – tentative report. Lapsus calami of Iassus.
- †Judolia
  - †Judolia antecurrens – type locality for species
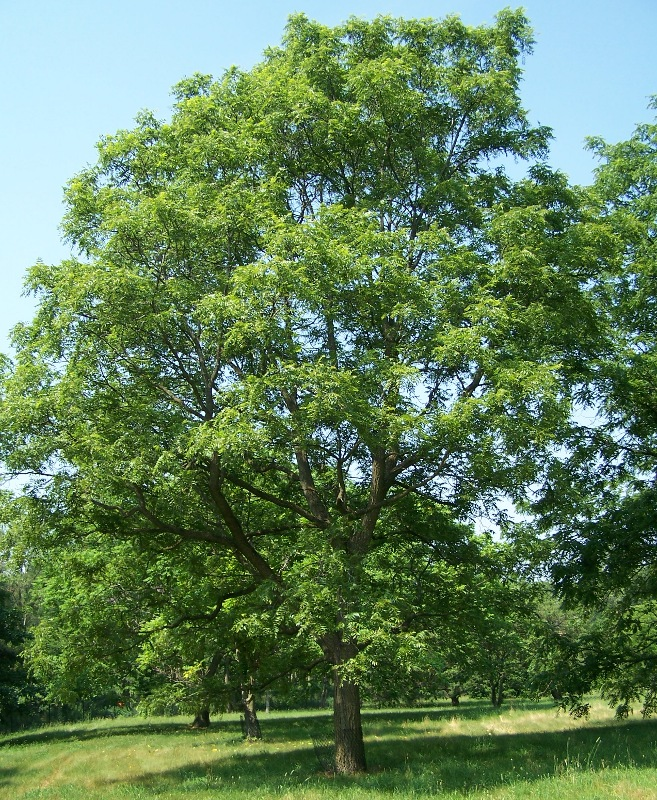
- A living Juglans, or walnut tree
  Juglans
- Junco
  - †Junco hyemalis
- †Juncus
- †Kalmia
- †Kimbetohia
- Koelreuteria
- †Lacon
- †Lagopus
  - †Lagopus leucurus
- †Lambdotherium
- †Lapton
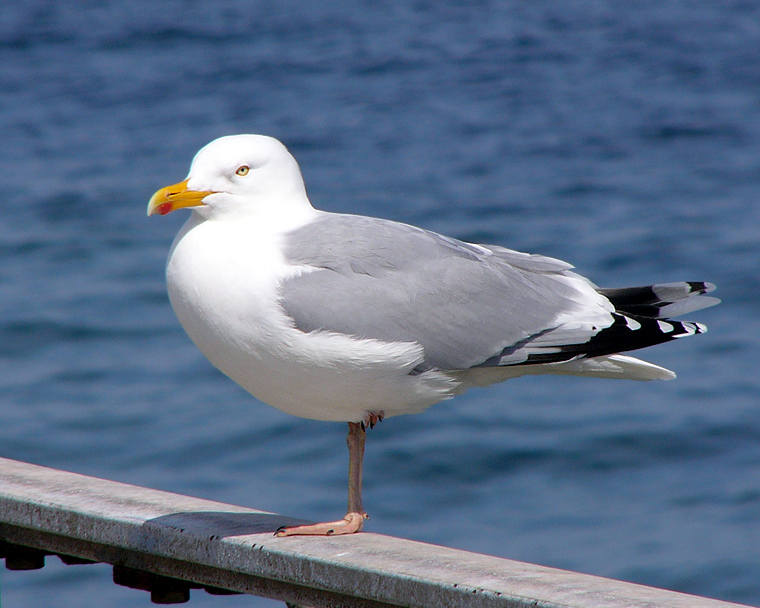
- A living Larus gull
  Larus
- Lasiopodomys
- Lasius
- Lathrobium
- Laurus
- †Lebia
- †Leia
- †Lema
- Lemmiscus
  - †Lemmiscus curtatus
- Lepisosteus
- †Leptauchenia
- †Leptis
- †Leptocyon
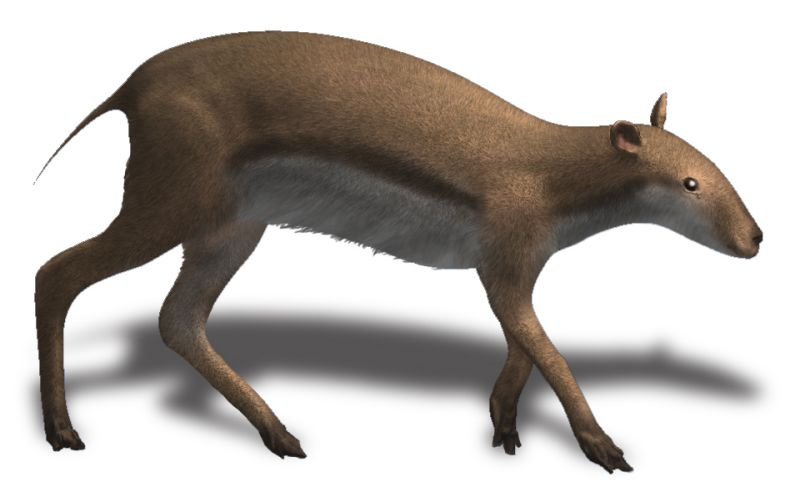
- Life restoration of the Eocene-Oligocene even-toed ungulate Leptomeryx
  †Leptomeryx
- †Leptomorphus
- Leptophloeus
- †Leptostylus
- †Leptura
- Lepus
  - †Lepus townsendii
- †Leucosticte
  - †Leucosticte atrata
  - †Leucosticte tephrocotis
- †Leucozona
- †Ligyrocoris
- †Ligyrus
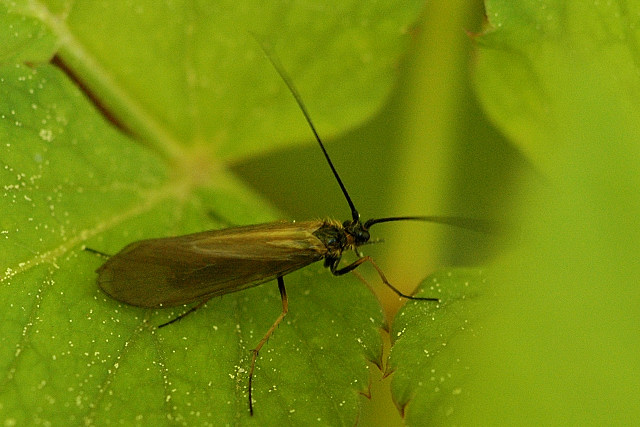
- A living Limnephilus caddisfly
  †Limnephilus
- †Limnobium
- †Limnophila
- †Limonius
- Lindera
- †Linnaea – type locality for genus
- †Linyphia
- †Liometopum
  - †Liometopum miocenicum – type locality for species
  - †Liometopum scudderi – type locality for species
- †Lithocharis
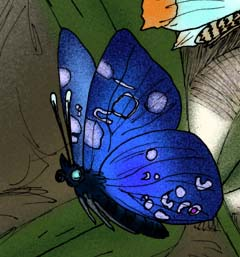
- Life restoration of the Eocene butterfly Lithodryas
  †Lithodryas – type locality for genus
  - †Lithodryas styx – type locality for species
- †Locusta
- Lomatia
- Longitarsus
- Lontra
  - †Lontra canadensis – or unidentified comparable form
- †Lucanus
- †Lycosa
- †Lygaeus
- Lygodium
- Lynx
  - †Lynx rufus
- Lytta
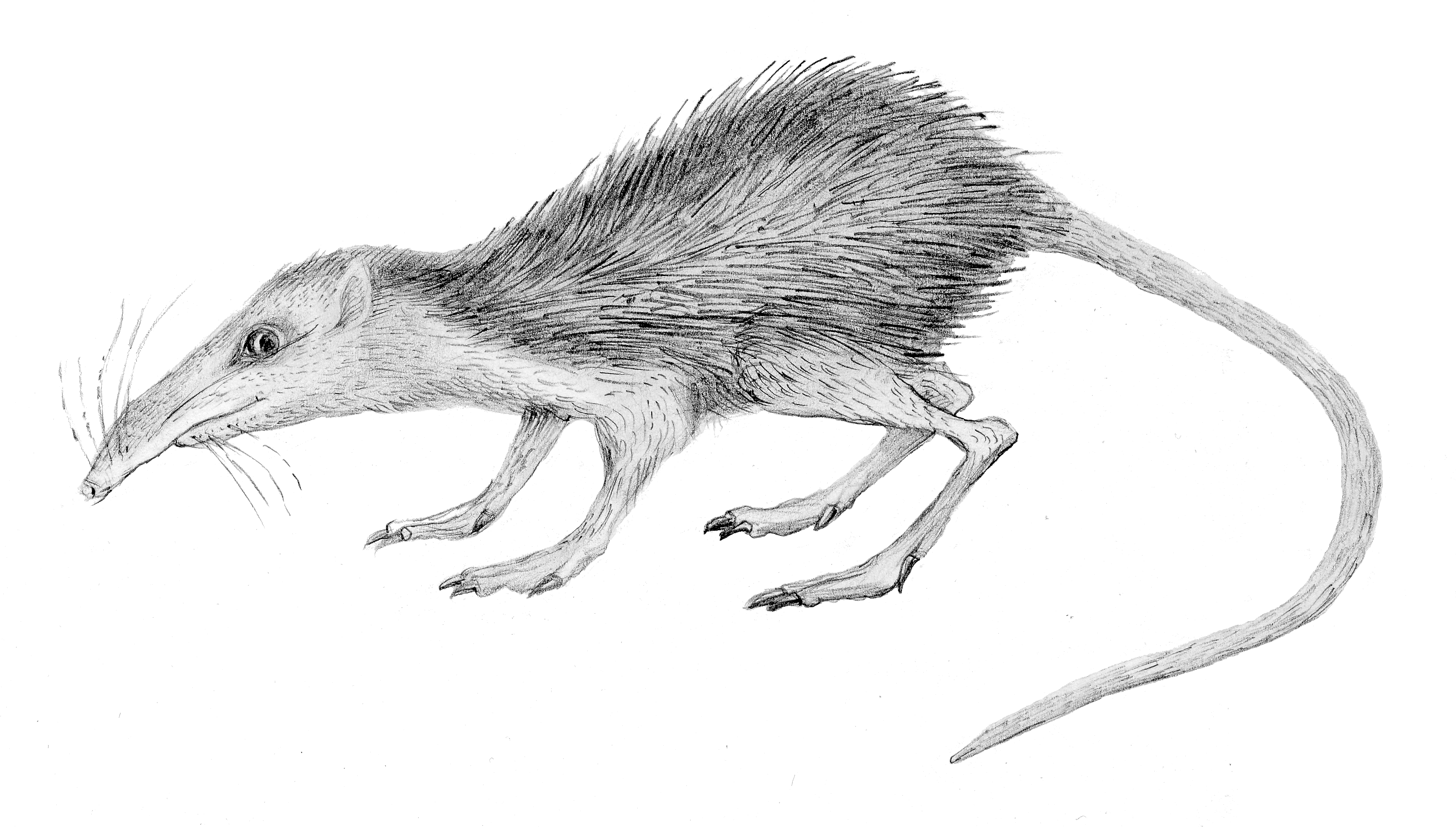
- Life restoration of the Eocene mammal Macrocranion
  Macrocranion
- †Macrodactylus
- †Macrophya
- †Macrorhoptus
- Magdalis
- Magnolia
- Mahonia
- †Maiorana
- †Malachius
- †Malus
- †Mammuthus
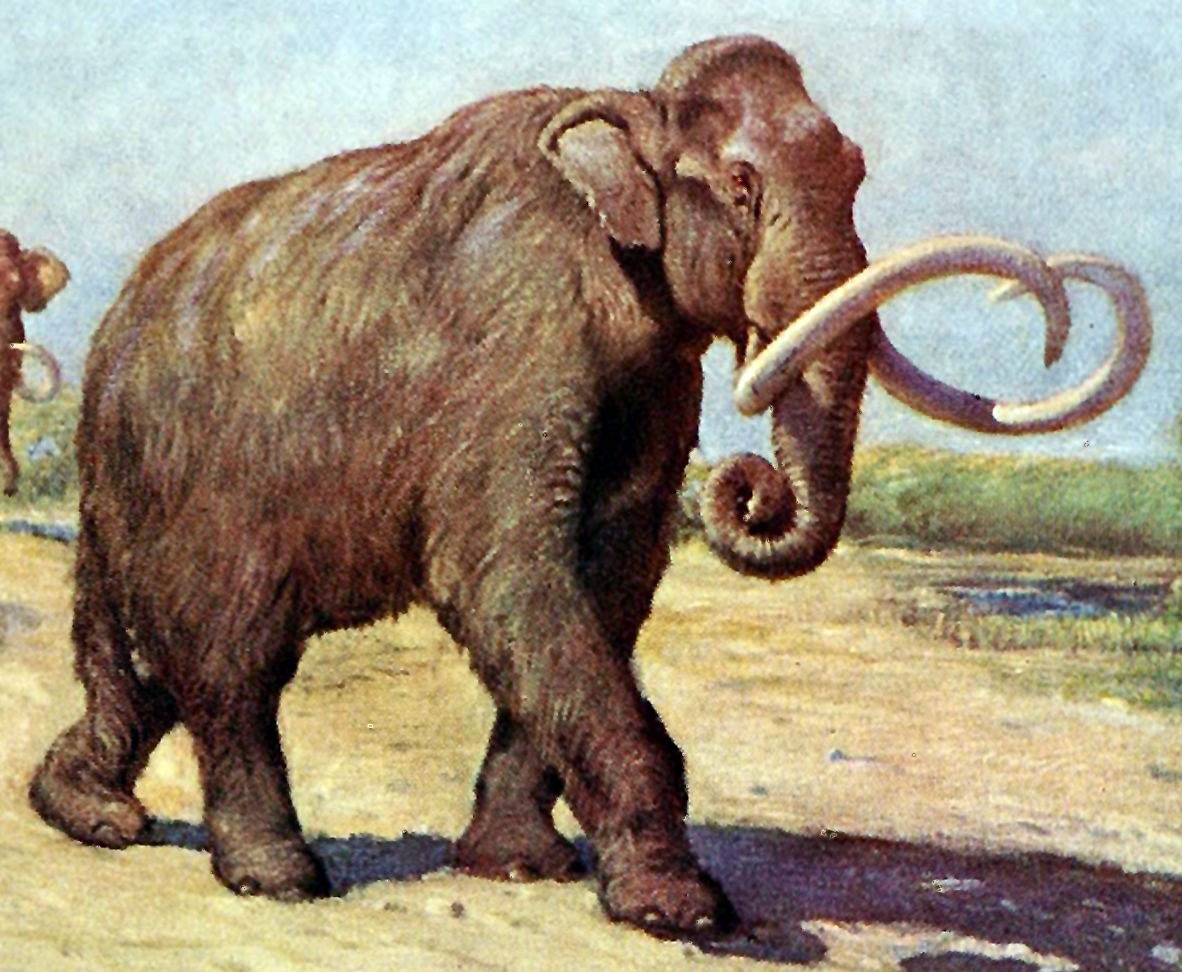
  - Life restoration of a herd of Mammuthus columbi, or Columbian mammoths. The extent of the fur depicted is hypothetical. Charles R. Knight (1909).
    †Mammuthus columbi
- Marmota
  - †Marmota flaviventris
- Martes
- †Megacerops
- Megachile
- †Megacyllene
- †Megahippus
- †Megalictis
- †Megapenthes
- †Megatylopus
- †Melanactes
- †Melanophila
- †Melieria
- †Melittomma
- †Mellinus
- Melospiza
  - †Melospiza lincolnii
- †Meniscotherium
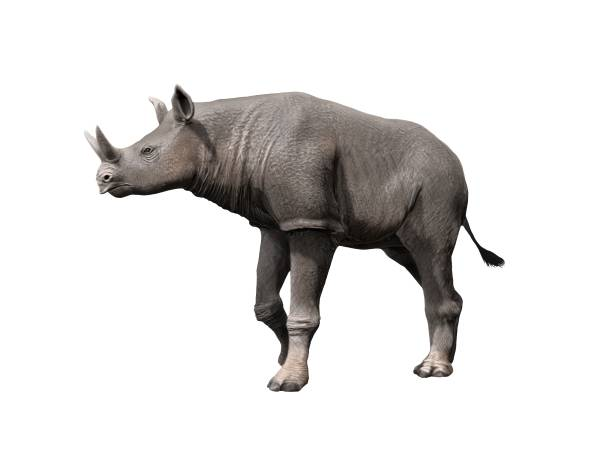
- Life restoration of the Miocene rhinoceros Menoceras
  †Menoceras
- Mephitis
  - †Mephitis mephitis
- †Merychippus
  - †Merychippus sejunctus
- †Merychyus
- †Merycochoerus
- †Merycodus
- †Merycoidodon – type locality for genus
- †Mesatirhinus
- †Mesochorus
- †Mesocyon
- †Mesodma
  - †Mesodma hensleighi
- †Mesohippus
- †Mesoleptus
- †Mesonyx
  - †Mesonyx obtusidens
- †Mesostenus
- Messor
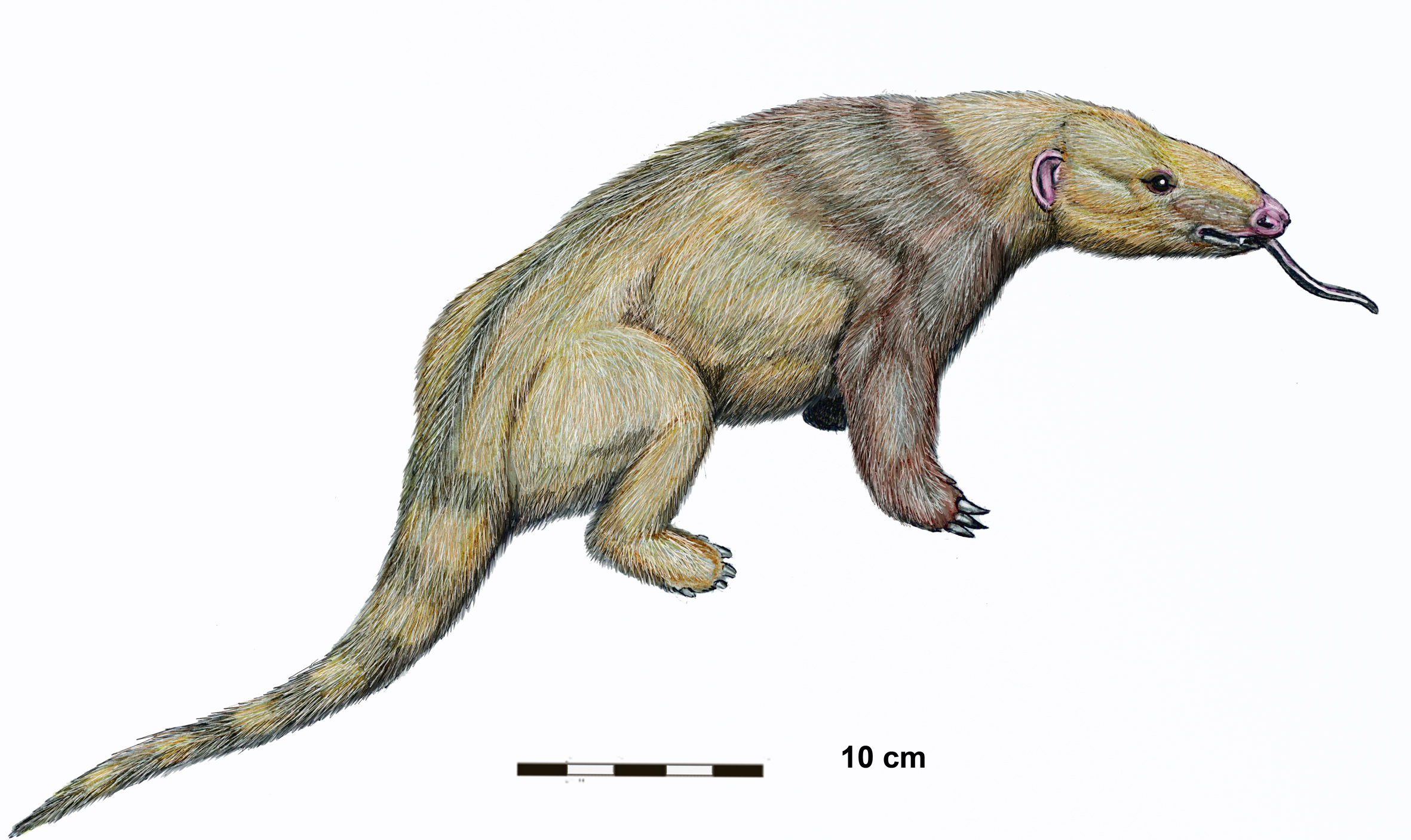
- Life restoration of the Eocene pangolin relative Metacheiromys
  †Metacheiromys
- Metachroma
- †Metarhinus
- Metasequoia
  - †Metasequoia occidentalis
- †Miacis
- Miagrammopes
- †Michenia
- †Microplitis
- †Microsyops
- †Microtomarctus
- Microtus
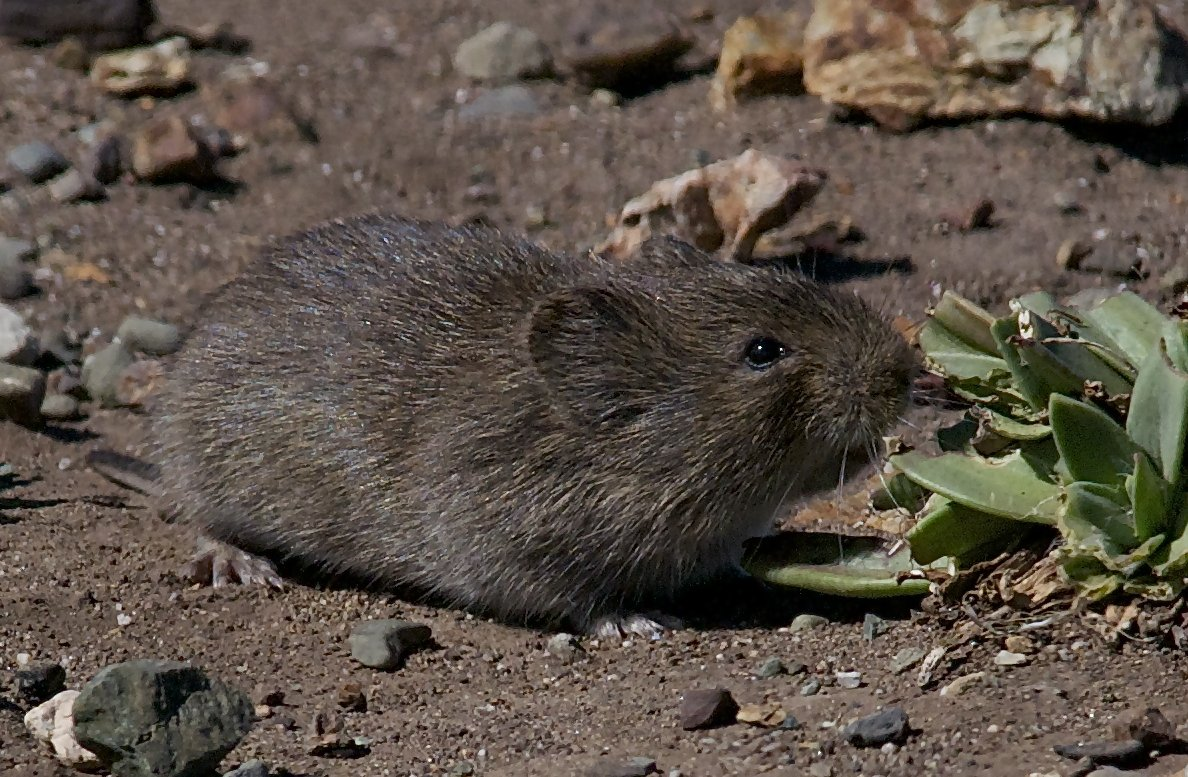
  - A living Microtus californicus, or California vole
    †Microtus californicus – or unidentified comparable form
  - †Microtus longicaudus
  - †Microtus ochrogaster
- †Mimoperadectes
- †Mindarus – type locality for genus
- †Miniochoerus
- †Miodytiscus – type locality for genus
- †Miohippus
- †Miomyrmex
  - †Miomyrmex impactus – type locality for species
  - †Miomyrmex striatus – type locality for species
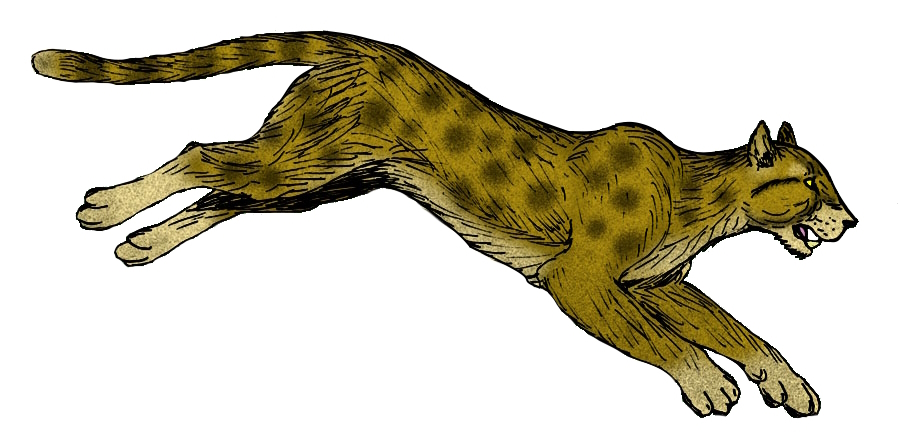
- Restoration of the Pliocene-Pleistocene Miracinonyx, or American cheetah
  †Miracinonyx
  - †Miracinonyx inexpectatus – or unidentified comparable form
  - †Miracinonyx studeri
- †Monosaulax
- Mordella
  - †Mordella atrata – or unidentified comparable form
  - †Mordella lapidicola – type locality for species
  - †Mordella priscula – type locality for species
  - †Mordella stygia – type locality for species
- Mordellistena
  - †Mordellistena florissantensis – type locality for species
  - †Mordellistena nearctica – type locality for species
  - †Mordellistena scudderiana – type locality for species
  - †Mordellistena smithiana – type locality for species
- †Moropus
- Morus
- Musca
- Mustela
  - †Mustela richardsonii
  - †Mustela nigripes
- †Myas
- †Mycetophagus
- Mycetoporus
- Myrica
- Myrmica
- Nebria
- †Nemognatha
- †Neoliotomus
  - †Neoliotomus conventus
  - †Neoliotomus ultimus
- Neogale
  - Neogale frenata
  - Neogale vison
- Neotoma
  - †Neotoma cinerea
- †Nepa
- †Nephila
- †Netelia
- †Nicocles
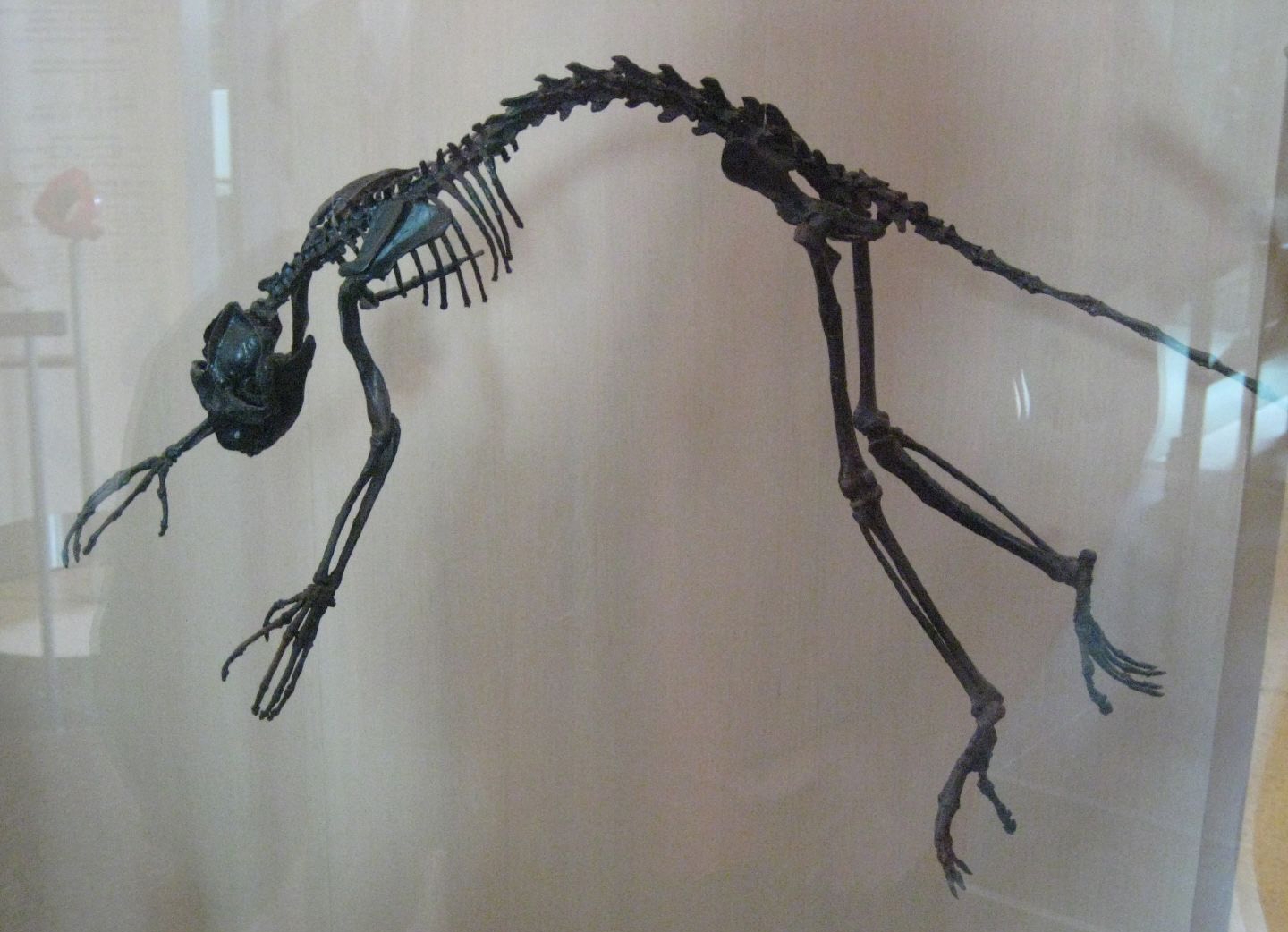
- Mounted fossilized skeleton of the Eocene primate Notharctus
  †Notharctus
  - †Notharctus robustior
- Notonecta
- Numenius
  - †Numenius madagascariensis
- †Numitor – type locality for genus
- †Nyctea
  - †Nyctea scandiaca
- Nymphaea
- Nysius
- †Nyssa
- Ochotona
  - †Ochotona princeps
- †Odaxosaurus – or unidentified comparable form
  - †Odaxosaurus piger
- Odocoileus
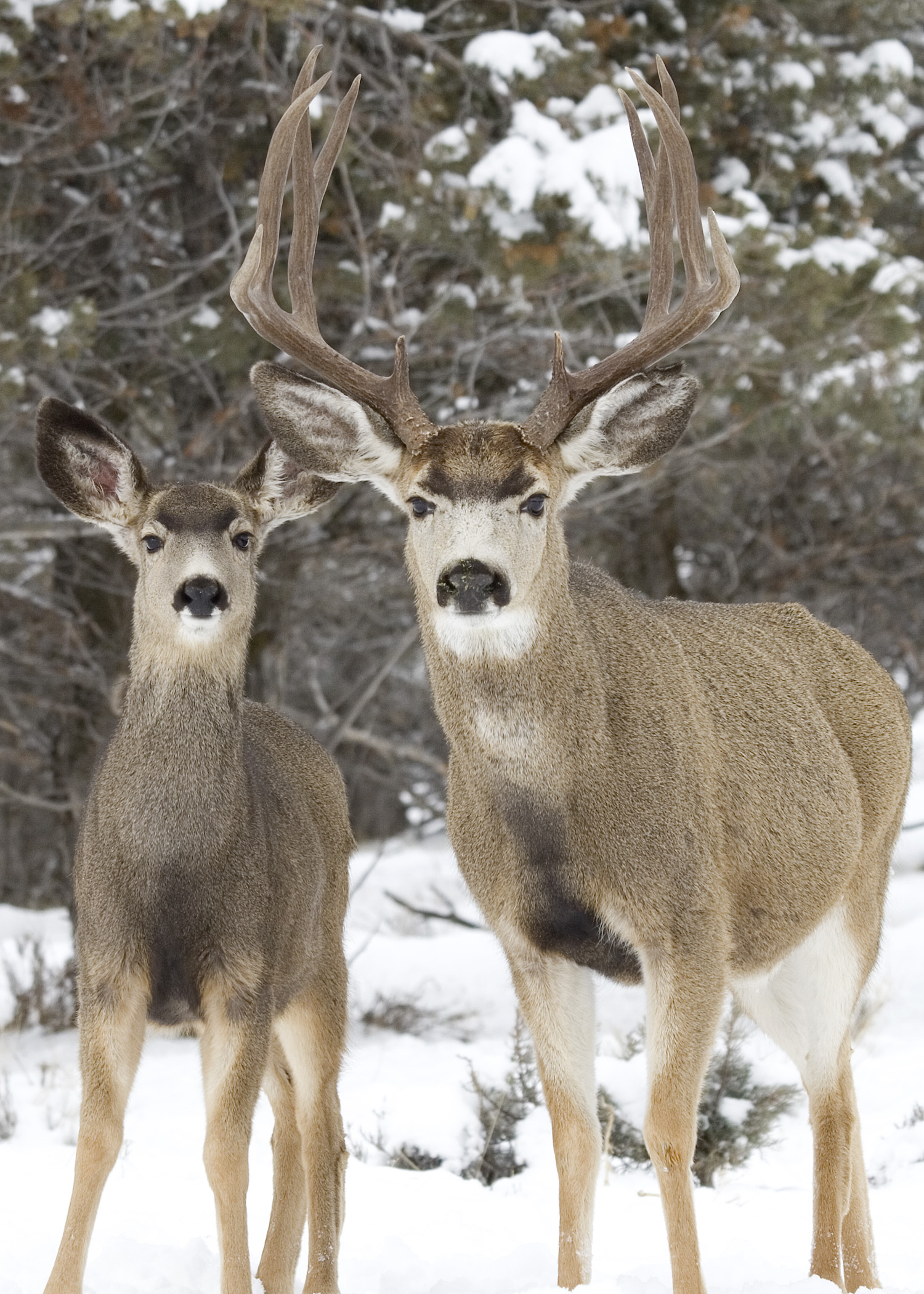
  - Living male (right) and female (left) Odocoileus hemionus, or mule deer.
    †Odocoileus hemionus
- †Odynerus
- †Oedipoda
- †Ogygoptynx – type locality for genus
- †Oligoaeschna – type locality for genus
- †Oligomerus
- †Oligotricha
- Omalium
- Omus
- Ondatra
- †Oodectes
- Ophisaurus
- Ophryastes
- †Ophyra
- †Opisthotriton
- †Orchelimum
- Orchestes
- Oreamnos – or unidentified comparable form
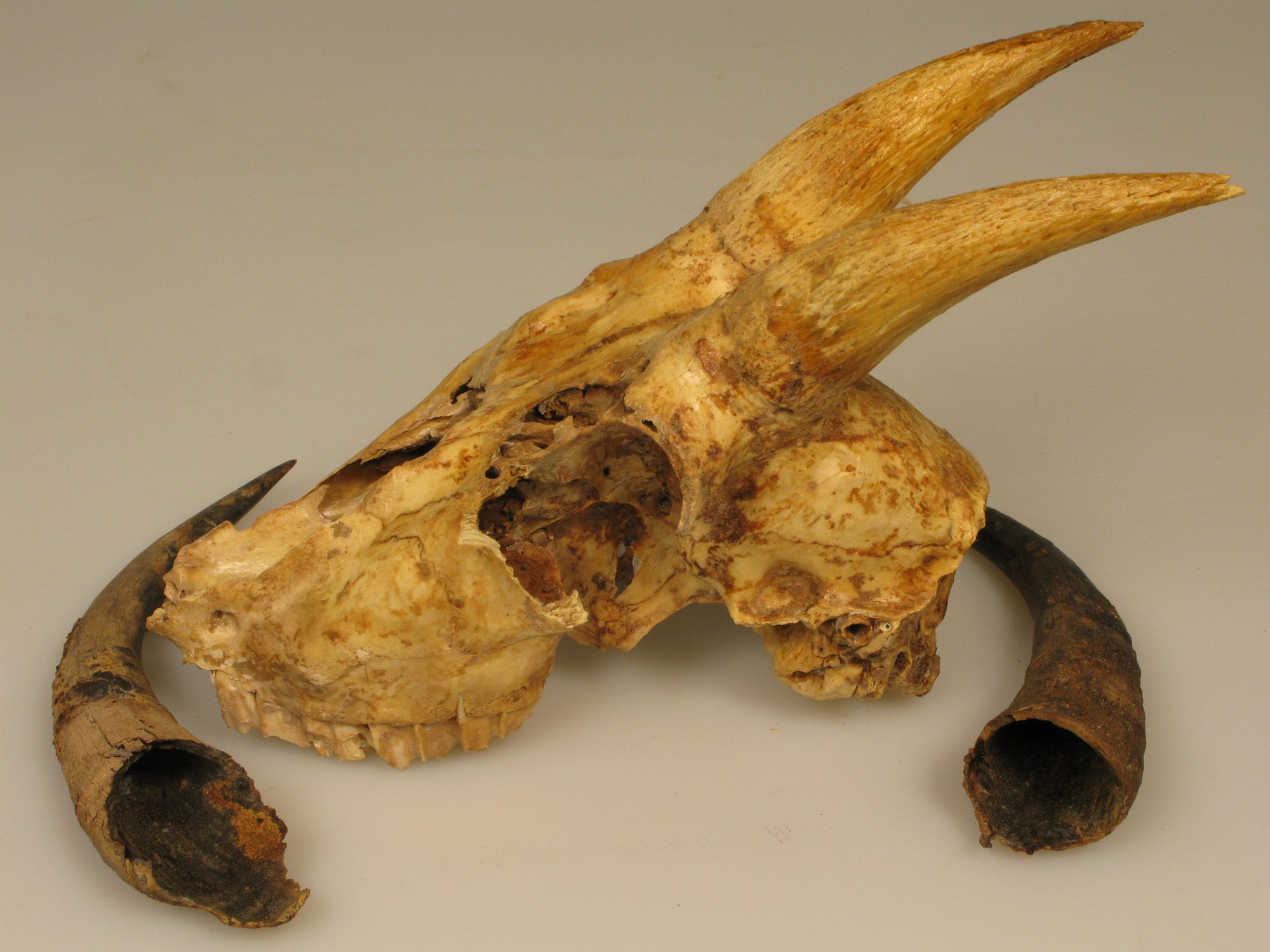
  - A living Oreamnos harringtoni, or Harrington's mountain goat
    †Oreamnos harringtoni
- †Oreopanax
- †Orohippus
- †Orontium
- †Orphilus
- †Orthocentrus
- †Osmanthus
- †Osmunda
  - †Osmunda greenlandica
- †Otiorhynchus
- Ovis
  - †Ovis canadensis
- †Oxyacodon
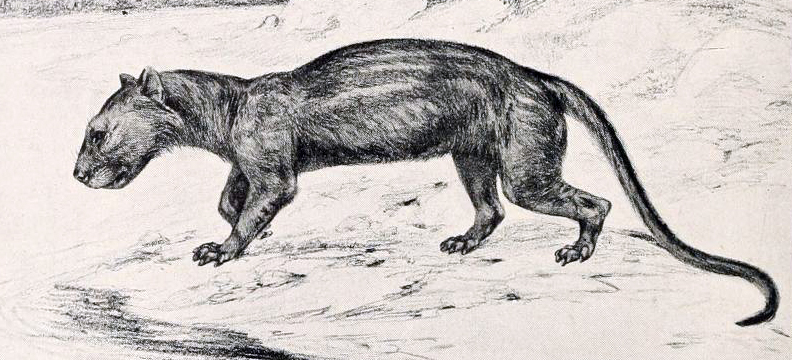
- Restoration of the Paleocene-Eocene creodont mammal Oxyaena
  †Oxyaena
- †Oxycera
- †Oxyomus
- †Pachyaena
- †Paederus
- †Palaeogale
- †Palaeolagus
- †Palaeonictis
- †Palaeosinopa
  - †Palaeospiza bella
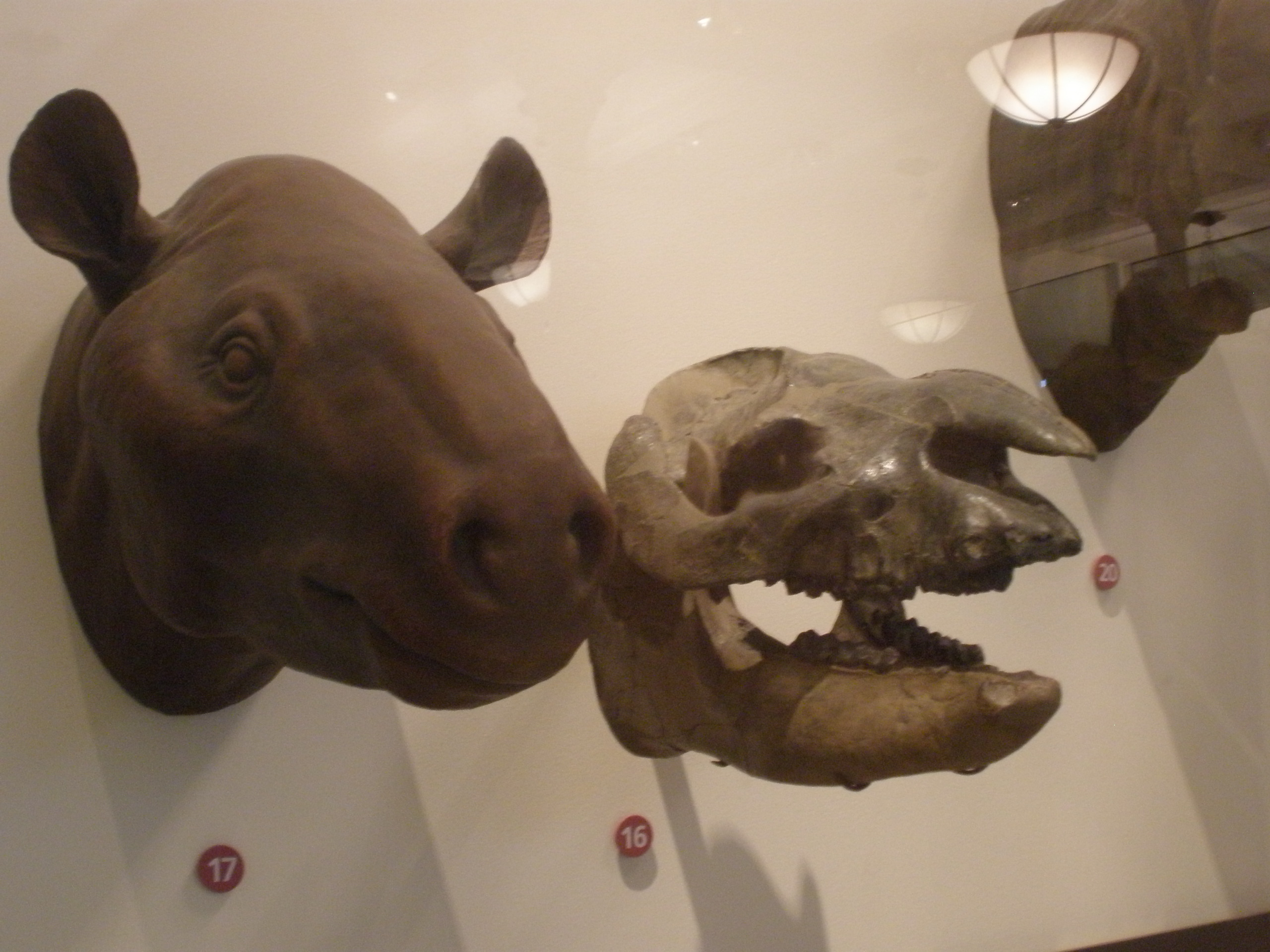
- Restorative model and fossilized skull of the Eocene brontothere mammal Palaeosyops
  †Palaeosyops – type locality for genus
- †Palaeovespa – type locality for genus
  - †Palaeovespa florissantia – type locality for species
  - †Palaeovespa gillettei – type locality for species
  - †Palaeovespa relecta – type locality for species
  - †Palaeovespa scudderi – type locality for species
  - †Palaeovespa wilsoni – type locality for species
- †Palatobaena
- †Panax
- †Panorpa
- †Paracynarctus
- †Parahippus
  - †Parahippus leonensis – or unidentified comparable form
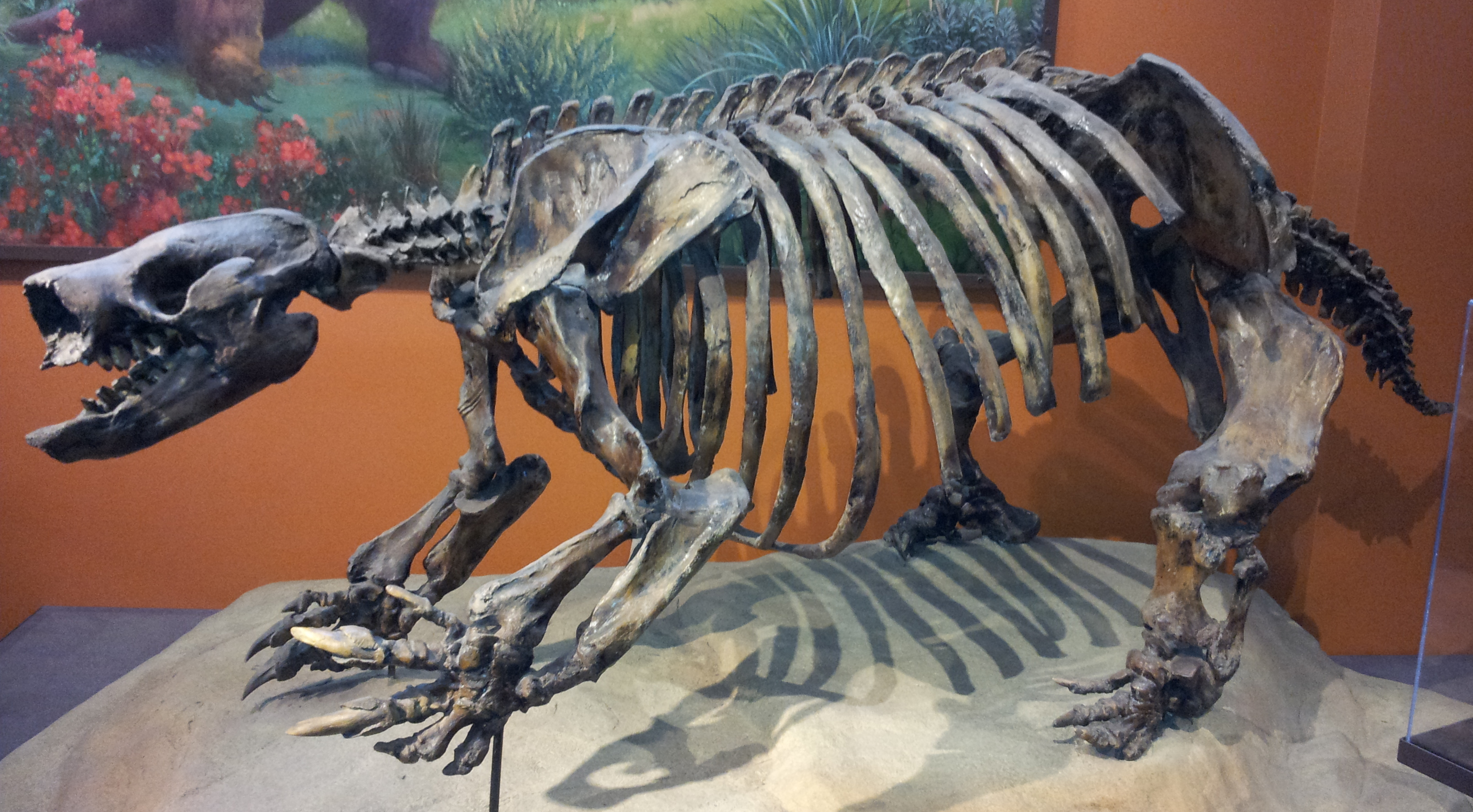
- Fossilized skeleton of the Pliocene-Pleistocene ground sloth Paramylodon
  †Paramylodon
  - †Paramylodon harlani
- †Paramys
- †Parandra
- †Paratylopus
- †Parectypodus
  - †Parectypodus lunatus
- †Parictis
- †Parthenocissus
- †Passaloecus
- †Patriofelis
- Pediacus
- Pekania
- †Pellea
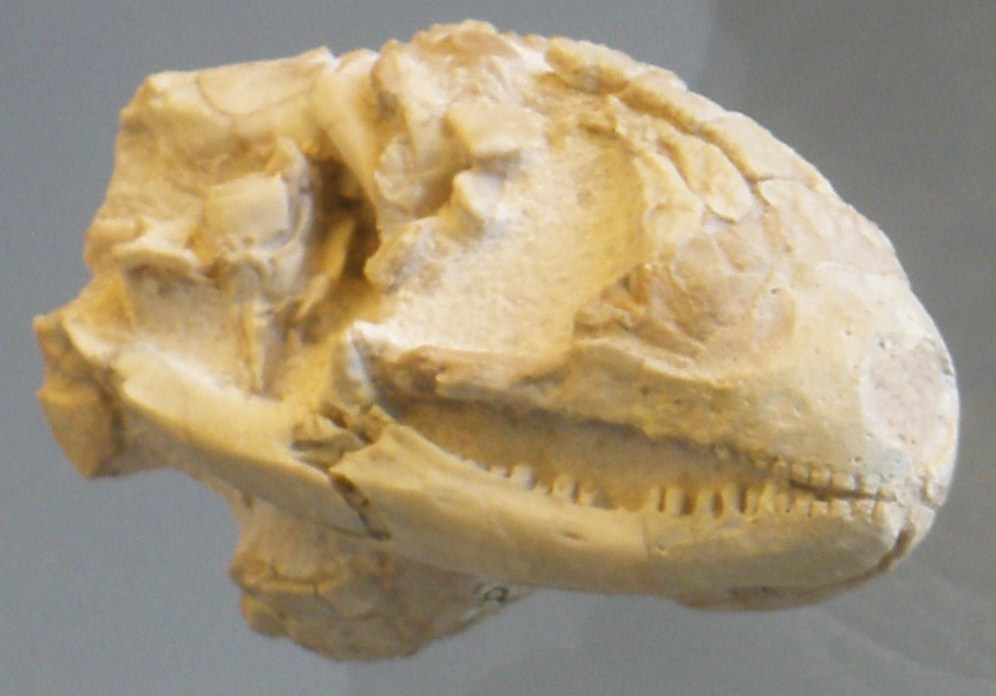
- Fossilized skull of the Eocene-Oligocene lizard Peltosaurus
  †Peltosaurus
  - †Peltosaurus granulosus – type locality for species
- †Pelycodus
  - †Pelycodus danielsae
  - †Pelycodus jarrovii
- Penthetria – type locality for genus
- †Pepsis
- †Peraceras
- †Peratherium
- Peromyscus
  - †Peromyscus maniculatus
- Persea
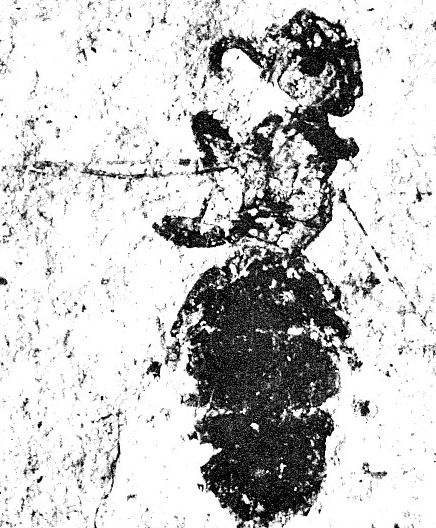
- Fossil of the Oligocene ant Petraeomyrmex
  †Petraeomyrmex – type locality for genus
  - †Petraeomyrmex minimus – type locality for species
- †Phaca
- Phalacrocorax
- Phalaropus
  - †Phalaropus lobatus
- †Phasmagyps – type locality for genus
- Pheidole
- †Phenacodus
- Phenacomys
  - †Phenacomys intermedius
- Philadelphus
- †Philanthus
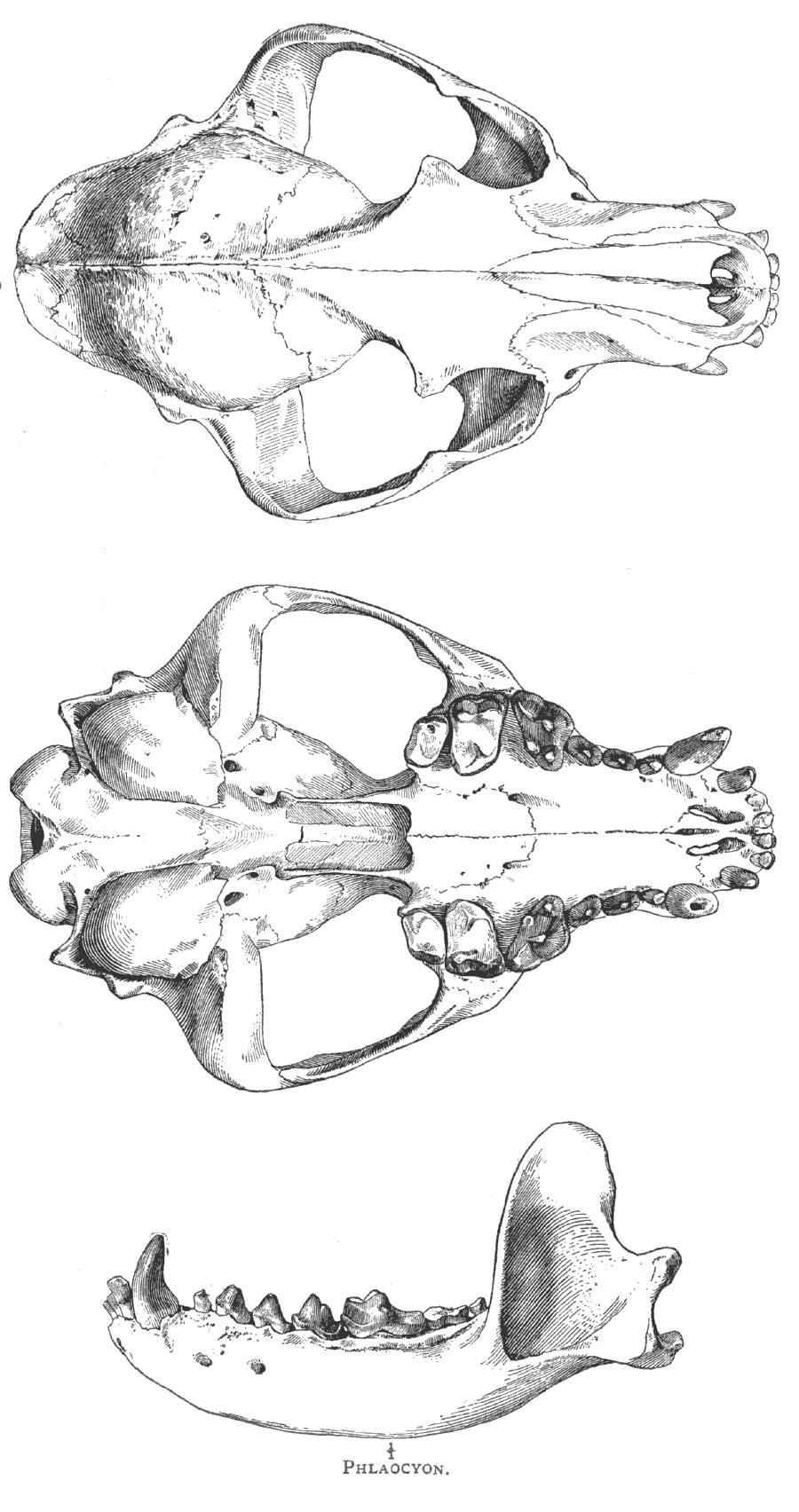
- Illustration of a fossilized skull in multiple views of the Oligocene-Miocene bone-crushing dog Phlaocyon
  †Phlaocyon
- Phloeosinus
- †Phora
- Phryganea
- Phrynosoma
  - †Phrynosoma douglassi
- †Phylledestes – type locality for genus
  - †Phylledestes vorax – type locality for species
- †Phyllobaenus
- Phyllobius
- †Phyllophaga
- †Phymatodes
- Pica
  - †Pica hudsonia
- Picea
- Picoides
  - †Picoides villosus
- †Pidonia
- †Pimpla
- Pinus
- †Pipiza
- †Pison
- Pituophis
  - †Pituophis melanoleucus
- Platanus
- Plateumaris
- †Platycheirus
- Platydema
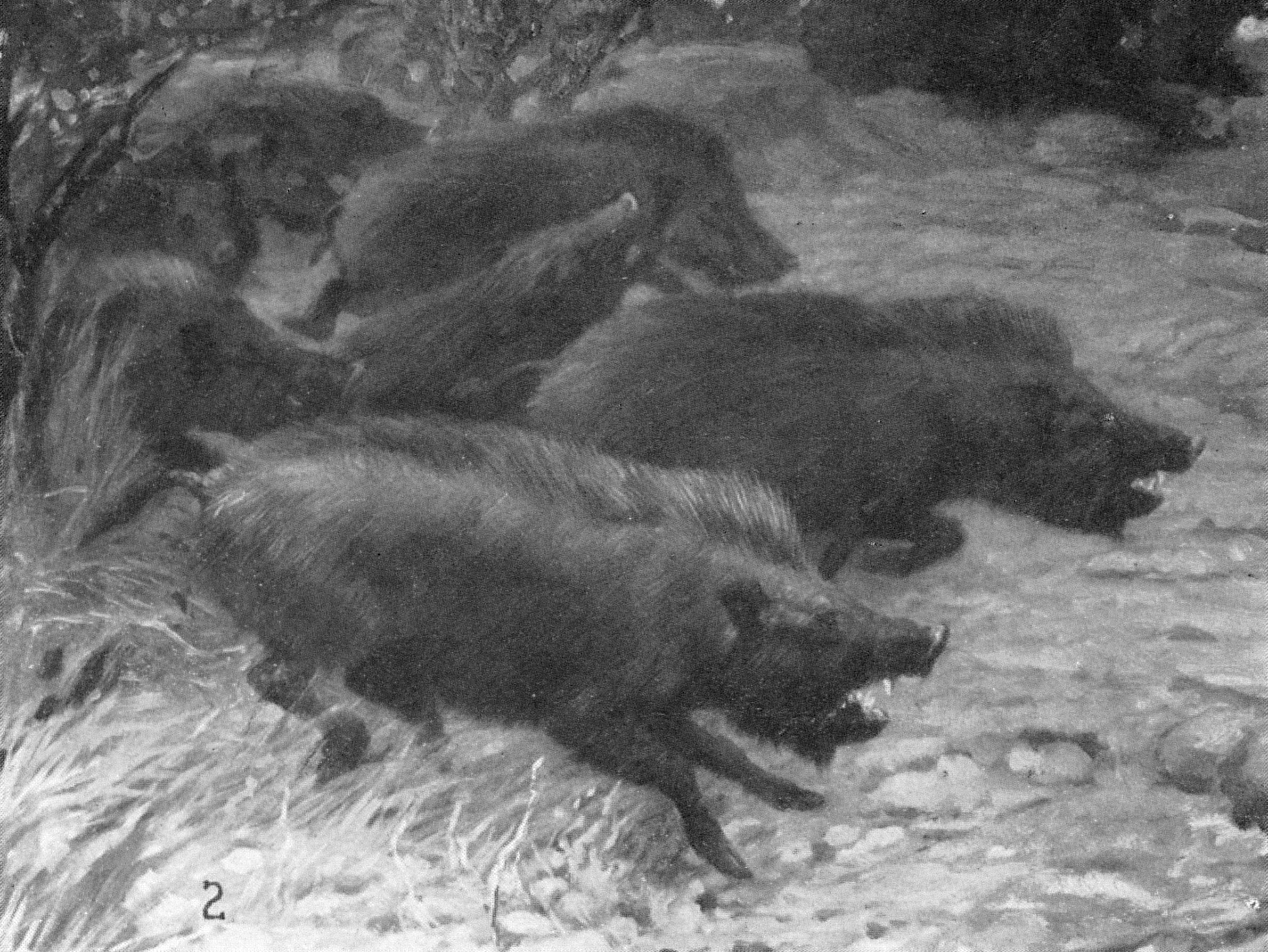
- Life restoration of a herd of alarmed Miocene-Pleistocene peccaries of the genus Platygonus. Charles R. Knight (1922).
  †Platygonus
- Platynus
- Platystethus
- Plecia
- †Plesiadapis
- †Plesiobaena
- †Pliohippus
- †Plochionus
- †Poabromylus
- Podabrus
- Podiceps
- Podilymbus
  - †Podilymbus podiceps
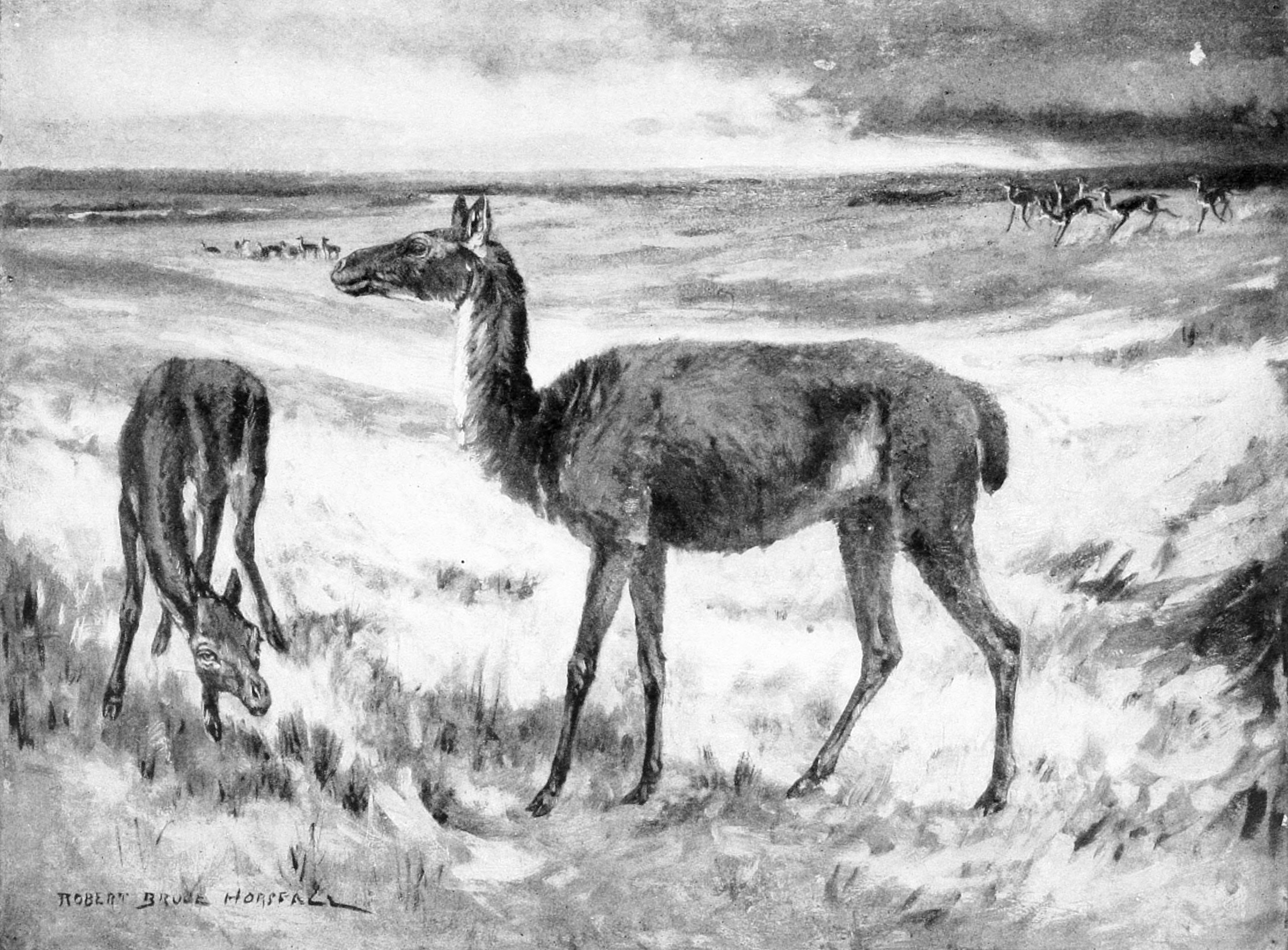
- Life restoration of the Eocene-Oligocene camel Poebrotherium
  †Poebrotherium
- †Poecilocapsus
- †Poecilognathus – type locality for genus
- †Pogonomyrmex
  - †Pogonomyrmex fossilis – type locality for species
- †Polysphincta
- Populus
- Porzana
  - †Porzana carolina
- †Potamogeton
- †Praepapilio – type locality for genus
  - †Praepapilio colorado – type locality for species
  - †Praepapilio gracilis – type locality for species
- †Priabona
- †Pristichampsus
- †Probathyopsis
- †Procas
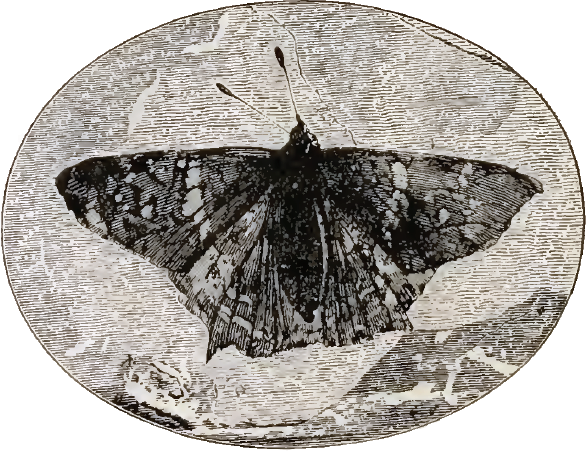
- Illustration of a fossil of the Eocene butterfly Prodryas
  †Prodryas – type locality for genus
  - †Prodryas persephone – type locality for species
- †Proiridomyrmex – type locality for genus
  - †Proiridomyrmex vetulus – type locality for species
- †Prolimnocyon
- †Proscalops
- Prosopis
- †Protazteca – type locality for genus
  - †Protazteca capitata – type locality for species
  - †Protazteca elongata – type locality for species
  - †Protazteca hendersoni – type locality for species
  - †Protazteca quadrata – type locality for species
- †Protohippus
- †Protolabis
- †Protomarctus
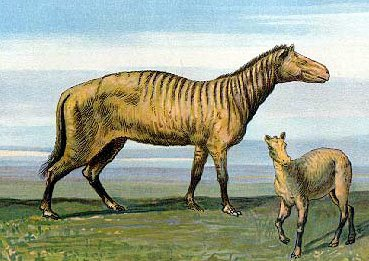
- Protorohippus
  †Protorohippus
- †Protostephanus – type locality for genus
  - †Protostephanus ashmeadi – type locality for species
- †Protungulatum
  - †Protungulatum donnae
- Prunus
  - †Prunus gracilis
- †Psephenus
- Pseudacris
  - †Pseudacris triseriata
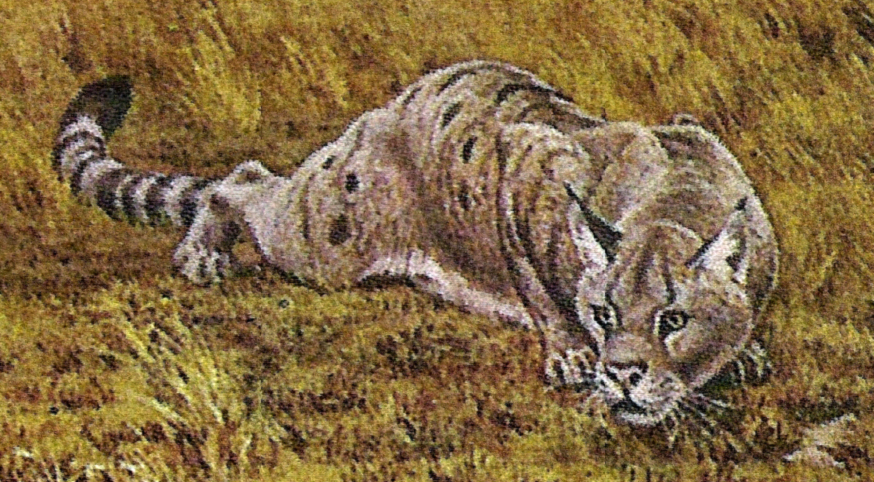
- Restoration of the Miocene cat Pseudaelurus
  †Pseudaelurus
- †Pseudhipparion
- Pseudomyrmex
- †Pseudoprotoceras
- †Psittacotherium
- Ptelea
- Pterocarya
- †Pteromalus
- Pterostichus
- †Ptilodus
  - †Ptilodus kummae
- †Ptosima
- Quedius
- Quercus
- Rallus
  - †Rallus limicola
- †Ramoceros
- †Rallus
  - †Rallus limicola
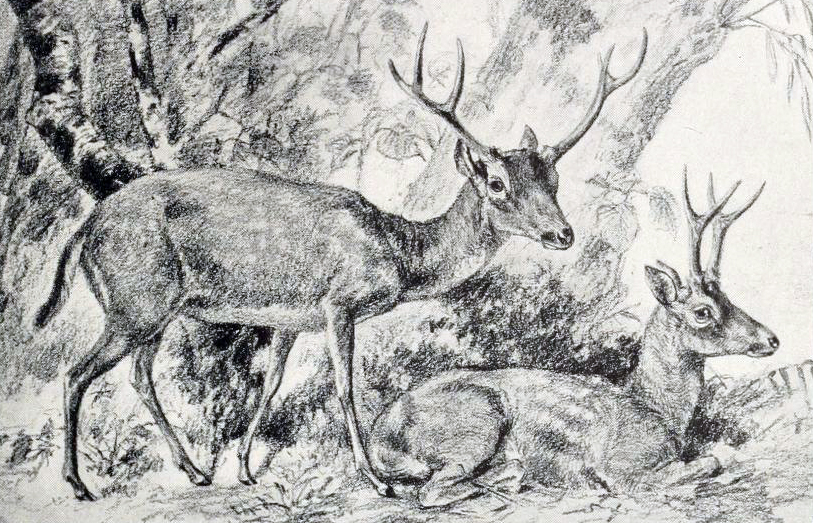
- Life restoration of the Miocene-Pliocene pronghorn Ramoceros and Cosoryx. Robert Bruce Horsfall (1913).
  †Ramoceros
- †Rana
  - †Rana catesbeiana
- †Raphidia
- Reithrodontomys
- Reticulitermes
- Rhabdomastix
- †Rhagio
- Rhagonycha
- †Rhamnus
- †Rhamphomyia
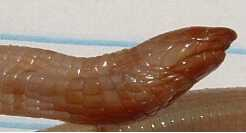
- A living Rhineura floridana, or North American worm lizard
  Rhineura
- †Rhingia
- Rhizophagus
- Rhus
- †Rhyssa
- †Ribes
- †Robinia
- †Rogas
- Rosa
- †Rothschildia
- Rubus
- Sabal
- †Saccoloma
- Salix
- †Sambucus
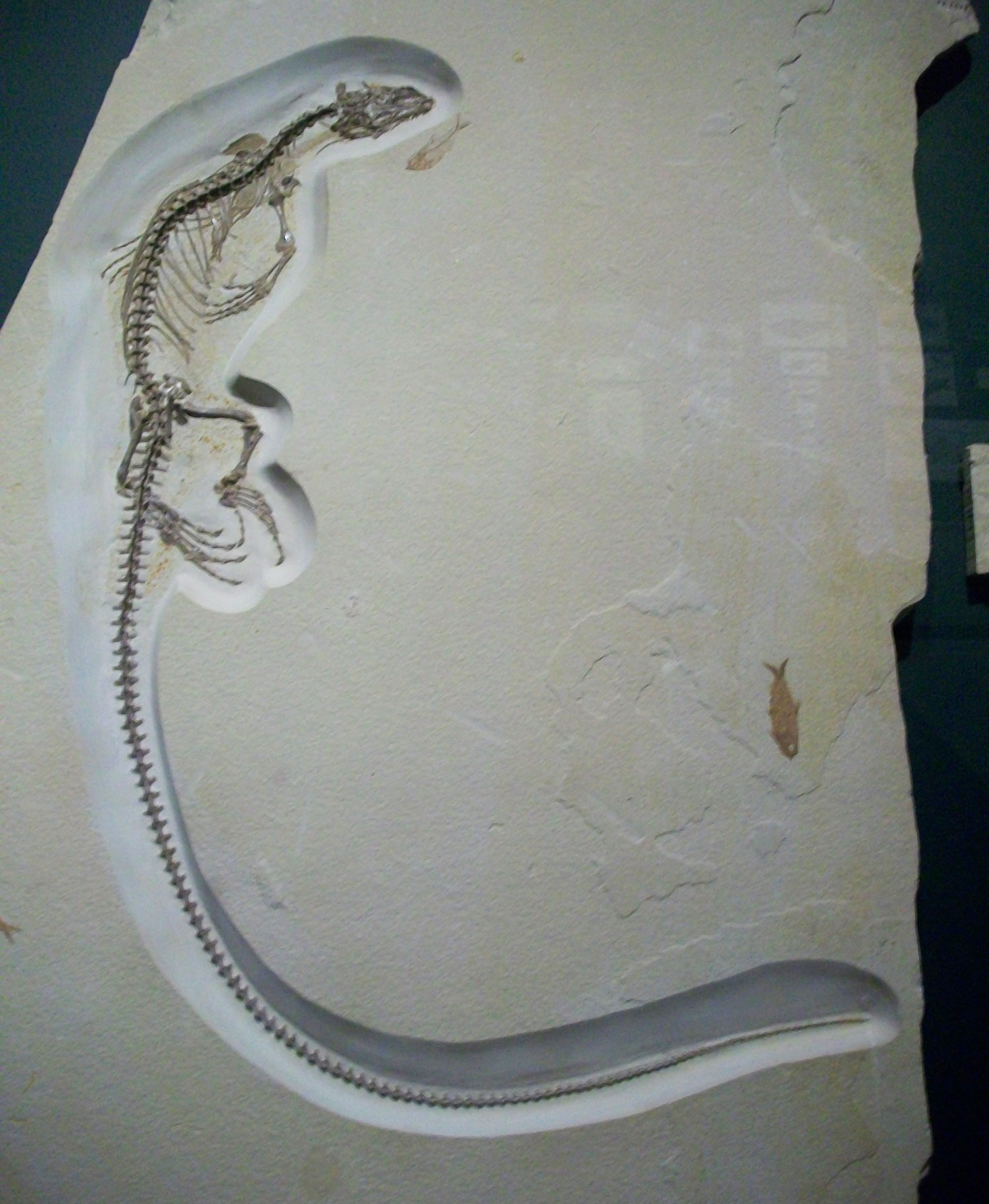
- Fossilized skeleton of the Eocene monitor lizard Saniwa
  †Saniwa
- †Saperda
  - †Saperda florissantensis – type locality for species
- †Sapindus
- †Sapromyza
- Sassafras
  - †Sassafras hesperia
- Scaphinotus
- Sceloporus
  - †Sceloporus undulatus
- Sciara
- †Sciophila
- Sciurus
- Scolytus
- †Segestria
- †Selaginella
- †Semanotus
- Sequoia
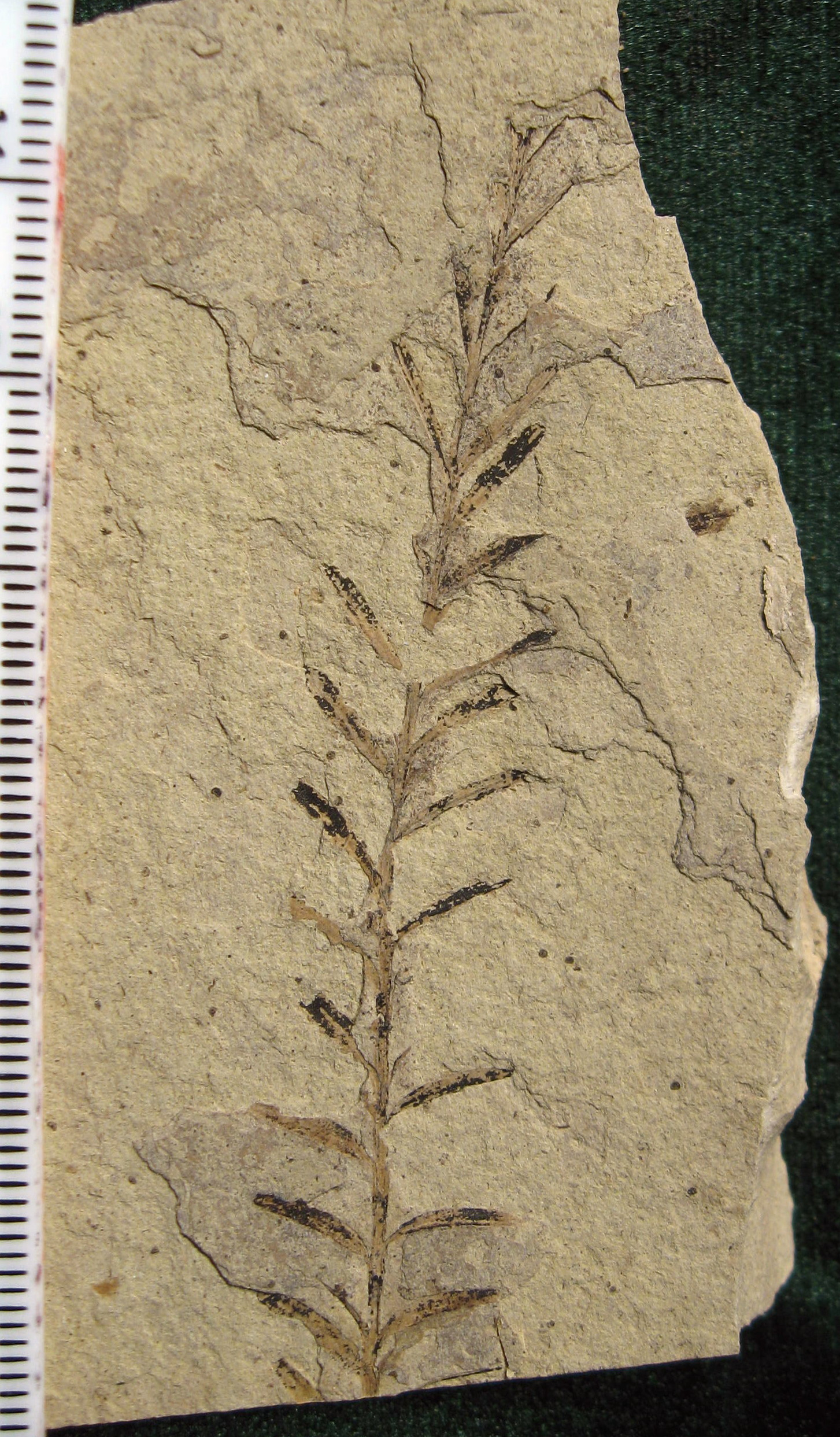
  - Fossilized branch fragment from a Sequoia affinis
    †Sequoia affinis
- Serica
- †Sespia
- †Sialia
- †Sibinia
- †Sifrhippus
- Sigmodon
- †Silpha
- †Silvius
- †Sinonyx – or unidentified comparable form
- Sitona
- †Sitones
- Sitta
  - †Sitta carolinensis
- †Smilax
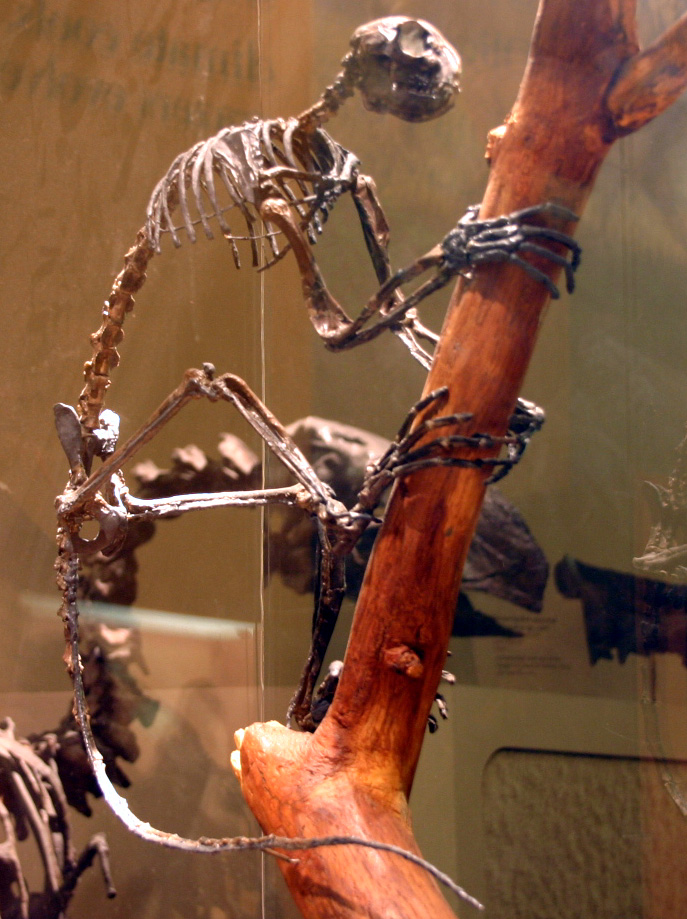
- Mounted fossilized skeleton of the Eocene primate Smilodectes
  †Smilodectes
  - †Smilodectes gracilis
  - †Smilodectes mcgrewi
- Sonoma
- Sorex
  - †Sorex arcticus
  - †Sorex hoyi
- †Sparganium
- Spea
  - †Spea bombifrons
- †Spermophagus
- Spermophilus
  - †Spermophilus elegans – or unidentified comparable form
  - †Spermophilus lateralis
  - †Spermophilus richardsonii
  - †Spermophilus tridecemlineatus
- †Sphegina
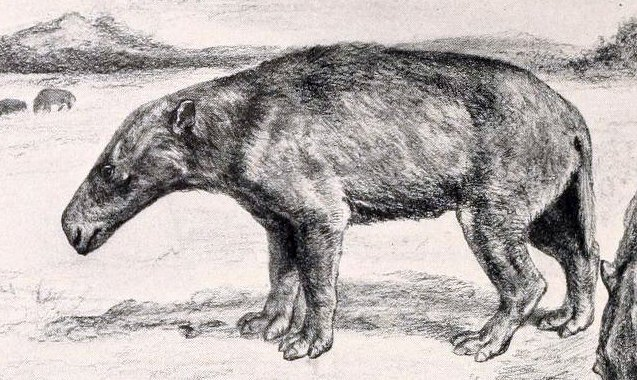
- Life restoration of the Eocene brontothere mammal Sphenocoelus
  †Sphenocoelus
- Spilogale
  - †Spilogale putorius
- Spizella
  - †Spizella breweri
- †Staphylea
- Staphylinus
- †Stenolophus
- †Stenosphenus
- Stenus
- Sterculia
- Stilbus
- †Stipa
- †Strategus
- †Stylinodon
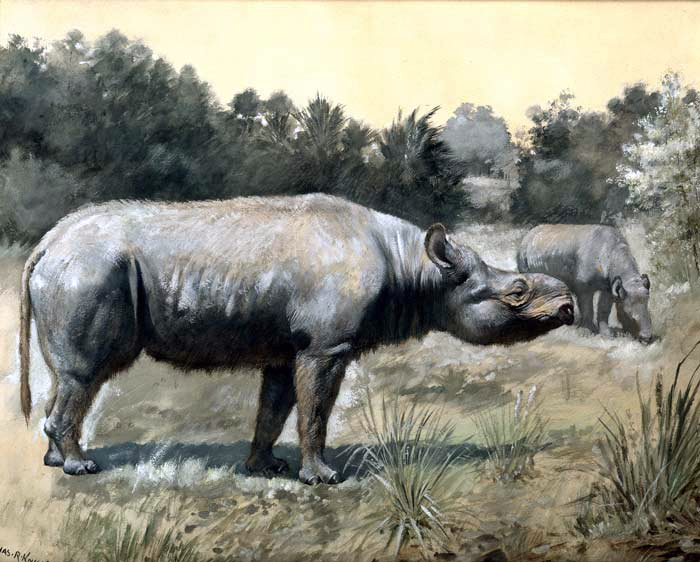
- Life restoration of the Eocene-Oligocene cow-sized rhinoceros Subhyracodon. Charles R. Knight (1890s).
  †Subhyracodon
- Sylvilagus
  - †Sylvilagus audubonii
- †Symphoromyia
- Syrphus
- †Systena
- †Tabanus
- Tachycineta
  - †Tachycineta bicolor
- Tachyporus
- †Tachys
- Tamiasciurus
  - †Tamiasciurus hudsonicus
  - †Tanysphyrus lemnae
- Tapirus
- Taxidea
  - †Taxidea taxus
- †Teilhardina
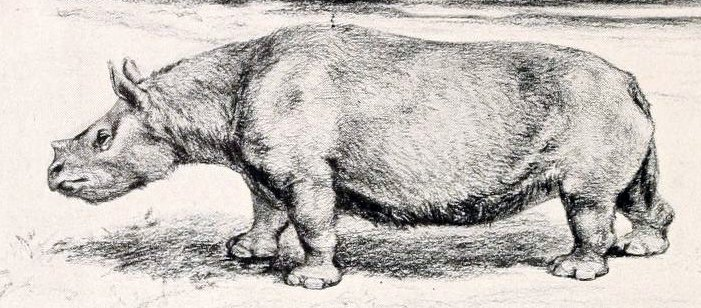
- Restoration of the Miocene-Pliocene rhinoceros Teleoceras
  †Teleoceras
- †Tenor – type locality for genus
- †Tenthredo
- †Tetragnatha
- †Tetraonyx
- †Tetraopes
  - †Tetraopes submersus – type locality for species
- †Tetrapus
- Thamnophis
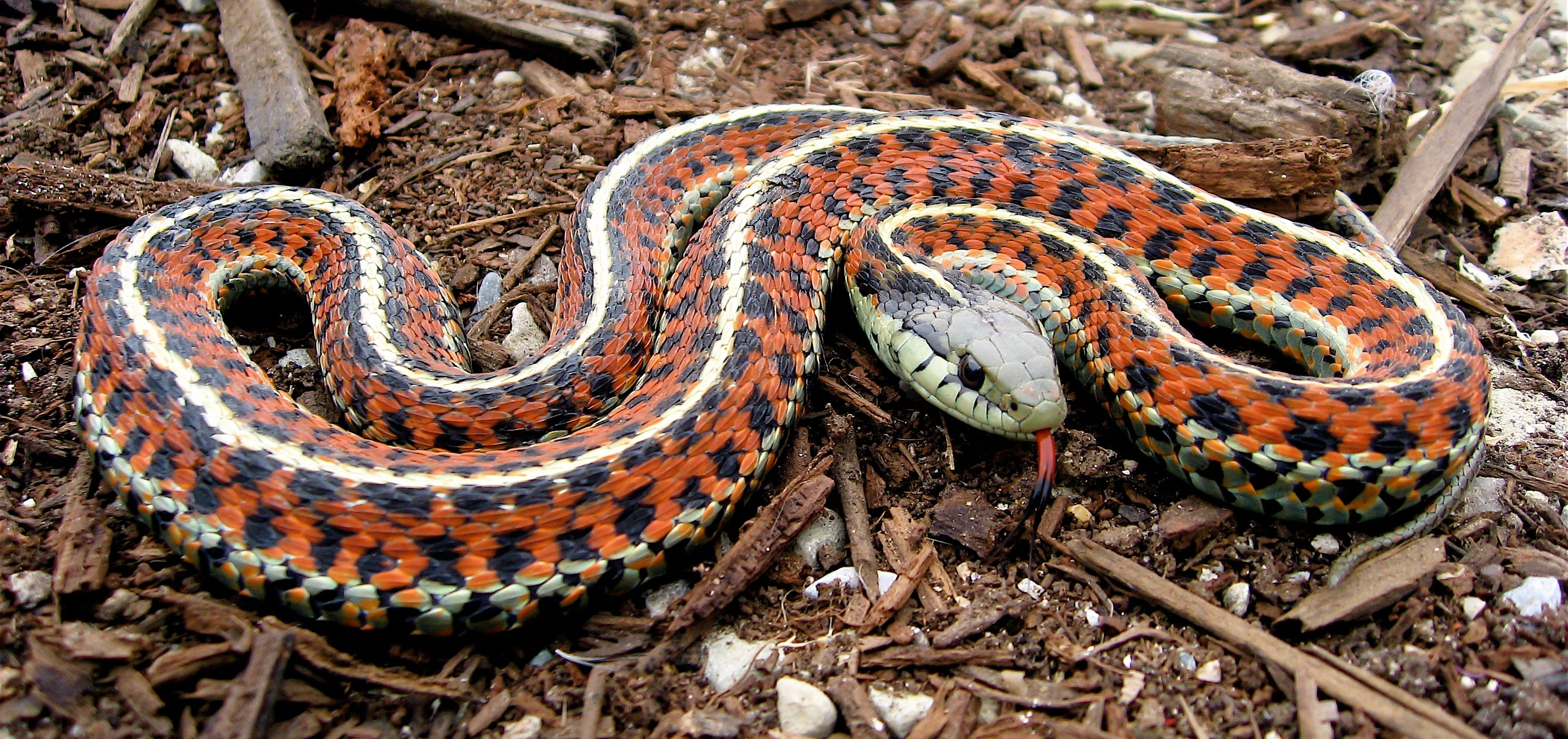
  - A living Thamnophis elegans, or western terrestrial garter snake
    †Thamnophis elegans
  - †Thamnophis sirtalis
- †Thanasimus
- †Themira
- †Thomisus
- Thomomys
  - †Thomomys talpoides
- †Thouinia
- †Thuja
- †Ticholeptus
- Tilia
- †Tingis
- Tipula – type locality for genus
- †Titanoeca
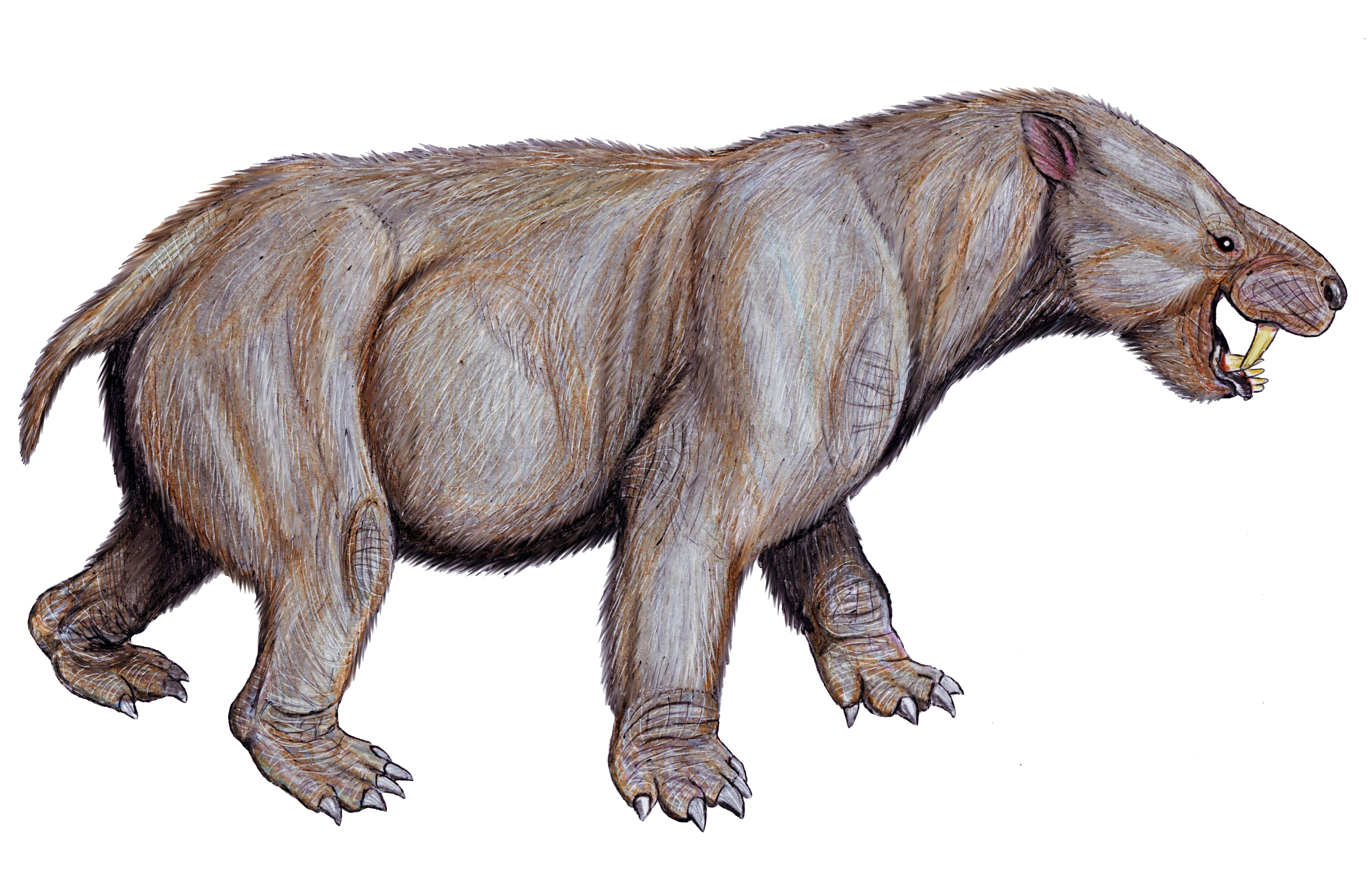
- Life restoration of the Paleocene pantodont mammal Titanoides
  †Titanoides
  - †Titanoides looki
  - †Titanoides primaevus
- †Tomarctus
  - †Tomarctus brevirostris – type locality for species
- †Tomoxia
  - †Tomoxia inundata – type locality for species
- †Torreya
- †Tortricites
- †Tortrix
  - †Tortrix florissantana – type locality for species
- †Torymus
- Trechus
- †Trichilia
- †Triga
- †Trigonias
- †Trigonoscuta
- †Triplax
- †Tritemnodon
- †Triumfetta
- †Trixoscelis
- †Trogosus
- Trogoxylon
- †Trogus
- †Tropisternus
- Trox
- †Trypherus
- †Tryphon
- †Tychius
- Typha
- †Uintacyon
- †Uintascorpio – type locality for genus
- Ulmus
- †Ulus
- Urocyon
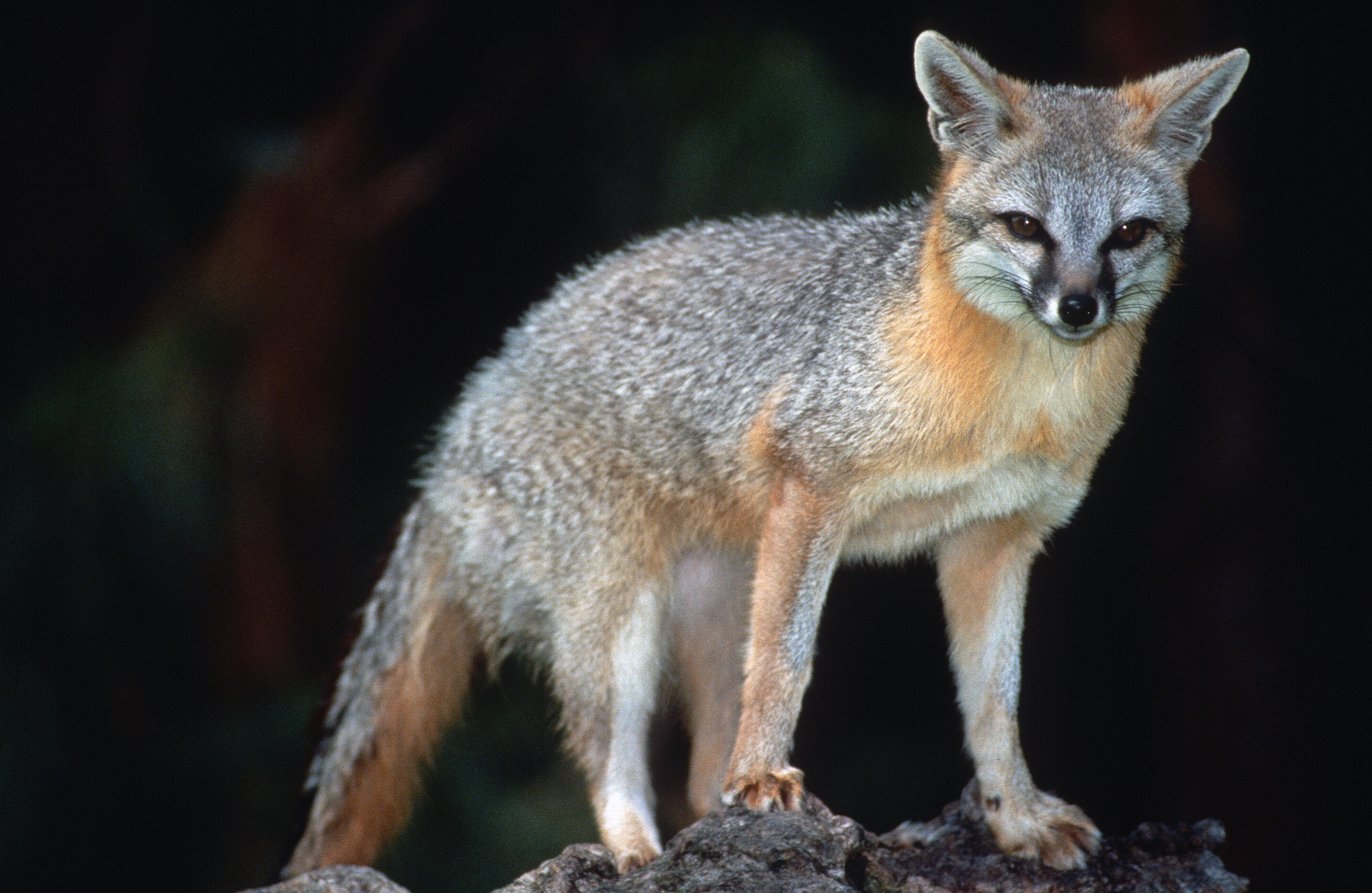
  - A living Urocyon cinereoargenteus, or gray fox
    †Urocyon cinereoargenteus
- †Ursavus
- Ursus
  - †Ursus americanus
- †Ustatochoerus
- †Vanessa
- †Vauquelinia
- †Viburnum
- †Vicia
- †Villa – type locality for genus
- Vitis
- †Viverravus
- †Vrilletta
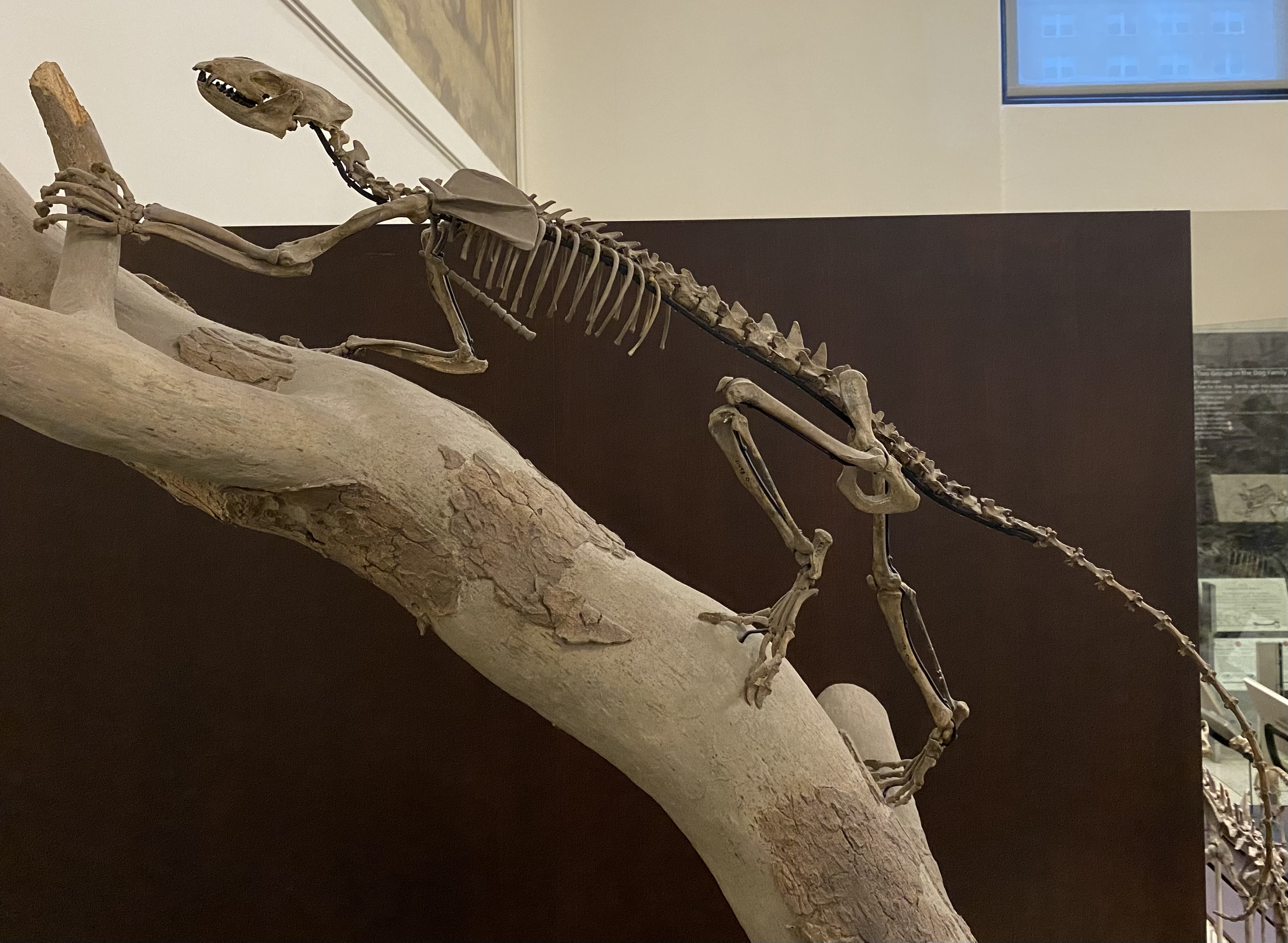
- Mounted fossilized skeleton of the Eocene mammal Vulpavus
  †Vulpavus
- Vulpes
  - †Vulpes velox
  - †Vulpes vulpes
- †Weinmannia
- †Woodwardia
- †Xantholinus
- †Xestobium
- †Xylocopa
- †Xylomya
- †Xyronomys
- †Yumaceras
- †Zamia
- Zelkova
- Zizyphus
- Zonotrichia
  - †Zonotrichia leucophrys
- †Zootermopsis
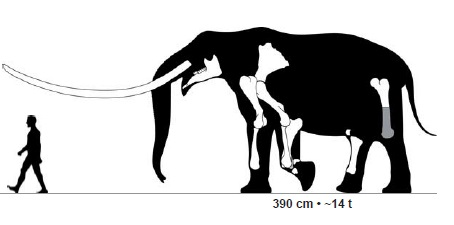
- Known material diagram depicting the Miocene-Pleistocene mastodon relative Zygolophodon with a human to scale
  †Zygolophodon
