= 1930 in paleontology =

Paleontology or palaeontology is the study of prehistoric life forms on Earth through the examination of plant and animal fossils. This includes the study of body fossils, tracks (ichnites), burrows, cast-off parts, fossilised feces (coprolites), palynomorphs and chemical residues. Because humans have encountered fossils for millennia, paleontology has a long history both before and after becoming formalized as a science. This article records significant discoveries and events related to paleontology that occurred or were published in the year 1930.

== Plants ==
=== Superrosids - Fabids ===
Name	Novelty	Status	Authors	Age	Unit	Location	Synonymized taxa	Notes	Images
Cercis idahoensis	Sp nov	Junior synonym	Berry	Miocene; Langhian	Latah Formation; Whitebird florule	USA; Idaho		First described as a Cercis species Leaves later reidentified as Vitis washingtonensis (1937); Fruits reidentified as Caesalpinia spokanensis (1991)	Caesalpinia spokanensis

==== Incertae sedis ====
Name	Novelty	Status	Authors	Age	Unit	Location	Synonymized taxa	Notes	Images
Antholithes amentiferus	Species nov		Berry	Eocene	Tallahatta Formation; Holly Springs sand member	USA; Tennessee		Named as a flower of uncertain affinity.	
Antholithes grablensis	Species nov		Berry	Eocene	Tallahatta Formation; Holly Springs sand member	USA; Tennessee		Named as a flower or fruit of uncertain affinity.	
Antholithes mimosaformis	Species nov		Berry	Eocene	Tallahatta Formation; Holly Springs sand member	USA; Tennessee		Named as a flower of uncertain affinity.	
Antholithes iliciformis	Species nov		Berry	Eocene	Tallahatta Formation; Holly Springs sand member	USA; Tennessee		Named as a flower of uncertain affinity.	
Antholithes pruniformis	Species nov		Berry	Eocene	Tallahatta Formation; Holly Springs sand member	USA; Tennessee		Named as a flower of uncertain affinity.	
Antholithes ternstroemioides	Species nov		Berry	Eocene	Tallahatta Formation; Holly Springs sand member	USA; Tennessee		Named as a flower of uncertain affinity.	
Antholithes wilcoxensis	Species nov		Berry	Eocene	Tallahatta Formation; Holly Springs sand member	USA; Tennessee		Named as a flower of uncertain affinity.	
Calycites milanensis	Species nov		Berry	Eocene	Tallahatta Formation; Holly Springs sand member	USA; Tennessee		Named as a flower or fruit of uncertain affinity.	
Calycites puryearensis	Species nov		Berry	Eocene	Tallahatta Formation; Holly Springs sand member	USA; Tennessee		Named as a flower or fruit of uncertain affinity.	
Calycites rhizophoroides	Species nov		Berry	Eocene	Tallahatta Formation; Holly Springs sand member	USA; Tennessee		Named as a flower or fruit of uncertain affinity.	
Carpolithus aggregatus	Species nov		Berry	Eocene	Tallahatta Formation; Holly Springs sand member	USA; Tennessee		Named as a racemose infructescence of uncertain affinity.	
Carpolithus ailanthioides	Species nov		Berry	Eocene	Tallahatta Formation; Holly Springs sand member	USA; Tennessee		Named as a winged seed of uncertain affinity.	
Carpolithus alatus	Species nov		Berry	Eocene	Tallahatta Formation; Holly Springs sand member	USA; Tennessee		Named as a winged fruit of uncertain affinity.	
Carpolithus banisteroides	Species	Junior synonym	Berry	Eocene	Claiborne Formation; Holly Springs sand member	USA; Tennessee		First named as a fruit of uncertain affinity. Synonymized into Eucommia eocenica (1997)	
Carpolithus bicapsulis	Species nov		Berry	Eocene	Claiborne Formation; Holly Springs sand member	USA; Tennessee		Named as a nutlets of uncertain affinity.	
Carpolithus bolivarensis	Species nov		Berry	Eocene	Tallahatta Formation; Holly Springs sand member	USA; Tennessee		Named as seeds of uncertain affinity.	
Carpolithus burseraformis	Species nov		Berry	Eocene	Tallahatta Formation; Holly Springs sand member	USA; Tennessee		Named as seeds of uncertain affinity.	
Carpolithus callowayensis	Species nov		Berry	Eocene	Tallahatta Formation; Holly Springs sand member	USA; Tennessee		Named as seeds of uncertain affinity.	
Carpolithus chesterensis	Species nov		Berry	Eocene	Tallahatta Formation; Holly Springs sand member	USA; Tennessee		Named as a fruit of uncertain affinity. Suggested as a possibly Cinnmmomwm ovoides fruit.	
Carpolithus collinsi	Species nov		Berry	Eocene	Tallahatta Formation; Holly Springs sand member	USA; Tennessee		Named as seeds of uncertain affinity.	
Carpolithus delicatulus	Species nov		Berry	Eocene	Tallahatta Formation; Holly Springs sand member	USA; Tennessee		Named as a flower of uncertain affinity.	
Carpolithus fagaraformis	Species nov		Berry	Eocene	Tallahatta Formation; Holly Springs sand member	USA; Tennessee		Named as seeds of uncertain affinity.	
Carpolithus gronovii	Species nov		Berry	Eocene	Tallahatta Formation; Holly Springs sand member	USA; Tennessee		Named as a fruit of uncertain affinity.	
Carpolithus hiraeaformis	Species nov		Berry	Eocene	Tallahatta Formation; Holly Springs sand member	USA; Tennessee		Named as a fruit of uncertain affinity.	
Carpolithus inequilateralis	Species nov		Berry	Eocene	Tallahatta Formation; Holly Springs sand member	USA; Tennessee		Named as seeds of uncertain affinity.	
Carpolithus juncaformis	Species nov		Berry	Eocene	Tallahatta Formation; Holly Springs sand member	USA; Tennessee		Named as a fruit of uncertain affinity.	
Carpolithus kentuckyensis	Species nov		Berry	Eocene	Tallahatta Formation; Holly Springs sand member	USA; Tennessee		Named as seeds of uncertain affinity.	
Carpolithus leitneriaformis	Species nov		Berry	Eocene	Tallahatta Formation; Holly Springs sand member	USA; Tennessee		Named as a nutlets of uncertain affinity.	
Carpolithus longepedunculatus	Species nov		Berry	Eocene	Tallahatta Formation; Holly Springs sand member	USA; Tennessee		Named as a nutlets of uncertain affinity.	
Carpolithus malpighiaformis	Species nov		Berry	Eocene	Tallahatta Formation; Holly Springs sand member	USA; Tennessee		Named as a winged seed of uncertain affinity.	
Carpolithus plumosus	Species nov		Berry	Eocene	Tallahatta Formation; Holly Springs sand member	USA; Tennessee		Named as a fruit of uncertain affinity.	
Carpolithus poaformis	Species nov		Berry	Eocene	Tallahatta Formation; Holly Springs sand member	USA; Tennessee		Named as seeds of uncertain affinity.	
Carpolithus sapindoides	Species nov		Berry	Eocene	Tallahatta Formation; Holly Springs sand member	USA; Tennessee		Named as seeds of uncertain affinity.	
Carpolithus rotundalatus	Species nov		Berry	Eocene	Tallahatta Formation; Holly Springs sand member	USA; Tennessee		Named as an orbicular fruit of uncertain affinity.	
Carpolithus sapindoides	Species nov		Berry	Eocene	Tallahatta Formation; Holly Springs sand member	USA; Tennessee		Named as seeds of uncertain affinity.	
Carpolithus shandyensis	Species nov		Berry	Eocene	Tallahatta Formation; Holly Springs sand member	USA; Tennessee		Named as a fruit of uncertain affinity.	
Carpolithus silertonensis	Species nov		Berry	Eocene	Tallahatta Formation; Holly Springs sand member	USA; Tennessee		Named as a nutlet of uncertain affinity.	
Carpolithus somervillensis	Species nov		Berry	Eocene	Tallahatta Formation; Holly Springs sand member	USA; Tennessee		Named as seeds of uncertain affinity.	
Carpolithus taylorensis	Species nov		Berry	Eocene	Tallahatta Formation; Holly Springs sand member	USA; Tennessee		Named as a seed of uncertain affinity.	
Leguminosites copaiferanus	Species nov	Junior synonym?	Berry	Eocene	Tallahatta Formation; Holly Springs member	USA; Tennessee		First named as a fruit of uncertain affinity. Synonymized into Eucommia eocenica (1997)	Eucommia eocenica
Phyllites grenadensis	Species nov		Berry	Eocene	Tallahatta Formation; Holly Springs sand member	USA; Tennessee		Named as a leaf of uncertain affinity.	
Simaroubites eocenica	Species nov	Junior synonym	Berry	Middle Eocene	Claiborne Formation	USA		First named as a fruit of uncertain affinity. Synonymized into Eucommia eocenica (1997)	

== Arthropods ==
=== Newly named insects ===
Name	Novelty	Status	Authors	Age	Unit	Location	Notes	Images
Aphaenogaster donisthorpei	Sp nov	Valid	Carpenter	Eocene; Priabonian	Florissant Formation	USA; Colorado	A myrmicin ant	
Aphaenogaster mayri	Sp nov	Valid	Carpenter	Eocene; Priabonian	Florissant Formation	USA; Colorado	A myrmicin ant	Aphaenogaster mayri
Archiponera	Gen et sp nov	Valid	Carpenter	Eocene; Priabonian	Florissant Formation	USA; Colorado	A ponerine ant, one species A. wheeleri	Archiponera wheeleri
Camponotus fuscipennis	Sp nov	Valid	Carpenter	Eocene; Priabonian	Florissant Formation	USA; Colorado	A formicine ant.	Camponotus fuscipennis
Camponotus microcephalus	Sp nov	Valid	Carpenter	Eocene; Priabonian	Florissant Formation	USA; Colorado	A formicine ant.	
Camponotus petrifactus	Sp nov	Valid	Carpenter	Eocene; Priabonian	Florissant Formation	USA; Colorado	A formicine ant.	
Cephalomyrmex	Gen et sp nov	Valid	Carpenter	Eocene; Priabonian	Florissant Formation	USA; Colorado	A myrmicine ant. The type species is C. rotundatus	Cephalomyrmex rotundatus
Dolichoderus antiquus	Sp nov	Valid	Carpenter	Eocene; Priabonian	Florissant Formation	USA; Colorado	A dolichoderine ant.	Dolichoderus antiquus
Dolichoderus rohweri	Sp nov	Valid	Carpenter	Eocene; Priabonian	Florissant Formation	USA; Colorado	A dolichoderine ant.	
Elaeomyrmex	Gen et 2 sp nov	Valid	Carpenter	Eocene; Priabonian	Florissant Formation	USA; Colorado	A dolichoderine ant the type species is E. gracilis also included is E. coloradensis	Elaeomyrmex gracilis
Eoformica pingue	Comb nov	Valid	Scudder, 1877	Eocene	Green River Formation	USA; Colorado	An incertae sedis ant species, Sr synonym to Eoformica eocenica Cockerell, 1921 corrected to Eoformica pinguis in 1995	Eoformica pinguis
Formica cockerelli	Sp nov	Valid	Carpenter	Eocene; Priabonian	Florissant Formation	USA; Colorado	A formicine ant.	Formica cockerelli
Formica grandis	Sp nov	Valid	Carpenter	Eocene; Priabonian	Florissant Formation	USA; Colorado	A formicine ant.	
Iridomyrmex florissantius	Sp nov	Valid	Carpenter	Eocene; Priabonian	Florissant Formation	USA; Colorado	A dolichoderine ant.	
Iridomyrmex obscurans	Sp nov	Nomen dubium	Carpenter	Eocene; Priabonian	Florissant Formation	USA; Colorado	A dolichoderine ant. Considered not identified in 2011	
Liometopum miocenicum	Sp nov	Valid	Carpenter	Eocene; Priabonian	Florissant Formation	USA; Colorado	A dolichoderine ant.	
Liometopum scudderi	Sp nov	Valid	Carpenter	Eocene; Priabonian	Florissant Formation	USA; Colorado	A dolichoderine ant.	
Lithomyrmex	Gen et 2 sp nov	Junior synonym	Carpenter	Eocene; Priabonian	Florissant Formation	USA; Colorado	An agroecomyrmecine ant The type species is L. rugosus, also includes L. striatus moved to Eulithomyrmex in 1935	Eulithomyrmex rugosus
Messor sculpturatus	Sp nov	Valid	Carpenter	Eocene; Priabonian	Florissant Formation	USA; Colorado	A myrmicine ant.	
Mianeuretus	Gen et Sp nov	Valid	Carpenter	Eocene; Priabonian	Florissant Formation	USA; Colorado	An aneuretine ant. The type species is M. mirabilis	
Miomyrmex	Trib, Gen et Sp nov	Valid	Carpenter	Eocene; Priabonian	Florissant Formation	USA; Colorado	A miomyrmecine dolichoderine ant. The type species is M. striatus	
Petraeomyrmex	Gen et Sp nov	Valid	Carpenter	Eocene; Priabonian	Florissant Formation	USA; Colorado	A dolichoderine ant. The type species is P. minimus	Petraeomyrmex minimus
Pheidole tertiaria	Sp nov	Valid	Carpenter	Eocene; Priabonian	Florissant Formation	USA; Colorado	A myrmicine ant.	
Pogonomyrmex fossilis	Sp nov	Valid	Carpenter	Eocene; Priabonian	Florissant Formation	USA; Colorado	A myrmicine ant.	
Protazteca	Gen, Comb, et 3 Sp nov	Valid	Carpenter	Eocene; Priabonian	Florissant Formation	USA; Colorado	A dolichoderine ant. The type species is P. elongata Also includes P. capitata, P. quadrata, and "Ponera" hendersoni (1906)	Protazteca elongata
Pseudocamponotus	Gen, Comb, et 3 Sp nov	Valid	Carpenter	Miocene		USA; Nevada	A camponotine formicine ant. The type species is P. elkoanus	
Pseudomyrma extincta	Sp nov	Junior synonym	Carpenter	Eocene; Priabonian	Florissant Formation	USA; Colorado	A pseudomyrmecine ant. Moved to Pseudomyrmex extinctus in 1990	

== Dinosaurs ==
Taxon	Novelty	Status	Author(s)	Age	Unit	Location	Notes	Images
Mandschurosaurus	Gen. nov.	Nomen dubium	Riabinin	Maastrichtian	Yuliangze Formation	China	A new genus name for Trachodon amurense	
Saurolophus kryschtofovici	Sp. nov.	Nomen dubium	Riabinin	Maastrichtian	Yuliangze Formation	China	A species of Saurolophus	

== Lepidosauromorphs ==
=== Newly named plesiosaurs ===
Name	Novelty	Status	Authors	Age	Unit	Location	Notes	Images
Macroplata	Gen et sp nov	Valid	Swinton	Early Jurassic (Hettangian-Sinemurian)	Lower Lias	UK	A rhomaleosaurid.	Macroplata

== Other animals ==
Name	Novelty	Status	Authors	Age	Unit	Location	Notes	Images
Orthogonium	Gen. et sp. nov.	Valid	Gürich	Ediacaran		Namibia	Enigmatic organism consisting of 8 parallel rows of tubes. The type species is O. parallelum	

== Paleontologists ==
- Death of William Diller Matthew.
