= Axinidris ghanensis =

Scientific classification
- Domain: Eukaryota
- Kingdom: Animalia
- Phylum: Arthropoda
- Class: Insecta
- Order: Hymenoptera
- Family: Formicidae
- Subfamily: Dolichoderinae
- Genus: Axinidris
- Species: A. ghanensis

Binomial name
- Axinidris ghanensis Shattuck, 1991

Species of ant

Axinidris ghanensis is a species of ant in the genus Axinidris. Described by Shattuck in 1991, the species is endemic to Ghana and Uganda, based on two collections.
