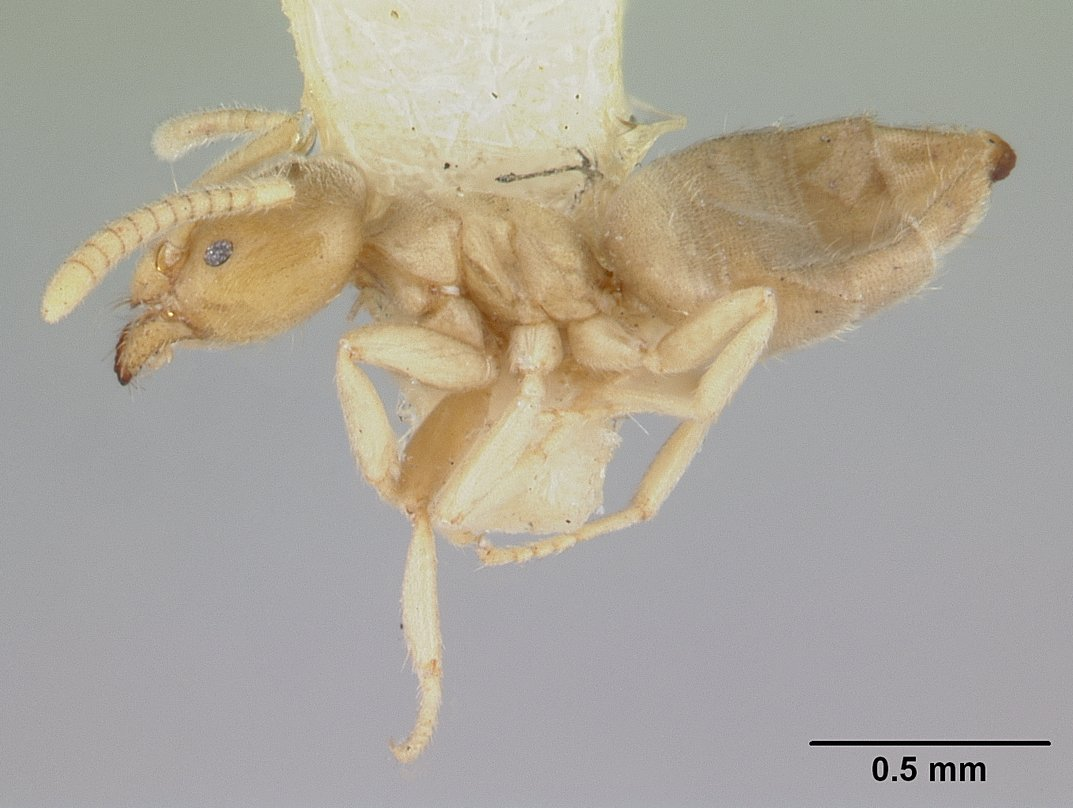
- Arnoldius flavus worker from Australia

Scientific classification
- Kingdom: Animalia
- Phylum: Arthropoda
- Class: Insecta
- Order: Hymenoptera
- Family: Formicidae
- Subfamily: Dolichoderinae
- Genus: Arnoldius
- Species: A. flavus

Binomial name
- Arnoldius flavus (Crawley, 1922)

= Arnoldius flavus =

Species of ant

Arnoldius flavus is a species of ant of the genus Arnoldius, one of only three species described in it. Native to Australia, it was described by Crawley in 1922.
