= Chronoxenus rossi =

Scientific classification
- Domain: Eukaryota
- Kingdom: Animalia
- Phylum: Arthropoda
- Class: Insecta
- Order: Hymenoptera
- Family: Formicidae
- Subfamily: Dolichoderinae
- Genus: Chronoxenus
- Species: C. rossi

Binomial name
- Chronoxenus rossi (Donisthorpe, 1950)

Species of ant

Chronoxenus rossi is a species of ant of the genus Chronoxenus. It was described by Donisthorpe in 1950.
