= Iridomyrmex florissantius =

†Iridomyrmex florissantius Temporal range: Fossil

Scientific classification
- Domain: Eukaryota
- Kingdom: Animalia
- Phylum: Arthropoda
- Class: Insecta
- Order: Hymenoptera
- Family: Formicidae
- Subfamily: Dolichoderinae
- Genus: Iridomyrmex
- Species: I. florissantius

Binomial name
- Iridomyrmex florissantius Carpenter, 1930

Species of ant

Iridomyrmex florissantius is an extinct species of ant in the subfamily Dolichoderinae. It was described by Frank M. Carpenter in 1930 after a fossil was found in the United States.
