= Axinidris tridens =

Scientific classification
- Domain: Eukaryota
- Kingdom: Animalia
- Phylum: Arthropoda
- Class: Insecta
- Order: Hymenoptera
- Family: Formicidae
- Subfamily: Dolichoderinae
- Genus: Axinidris
- Species: A. tridens

Binomial name
- Axinidris tridens (Arnold, 1946)

Species of ant

Axinidris tridens is a species of ant in the genus Axinidris. Described by Arnold in 1946, the species is endemic to Malawi, where they were collected from partially decaying trees.
