= Iridomyrmex obscurans =

†Iridomyrmex obscurans Temporal range: Fossil

Scientific classification
- Kingdom: Animalia
- Phylum: Arthropoda
- Class: Insecta
- Order: Hymenoptera
- Family: Formicidae
- Subfamily: Dolichoderinae
- Genus: Iridomyrmex
- Species: I. obscurans

Binomial name
- Iridomyrmex obscurans Carpenter, 1930

Species of ant

Iridomyrmex obscurans is an extinct species of ant in the subfamily Dolichoderinae. Described by Frank Carpenter in 1930, the fossil was discovered in the United States, but nothing much is known about this ant.
