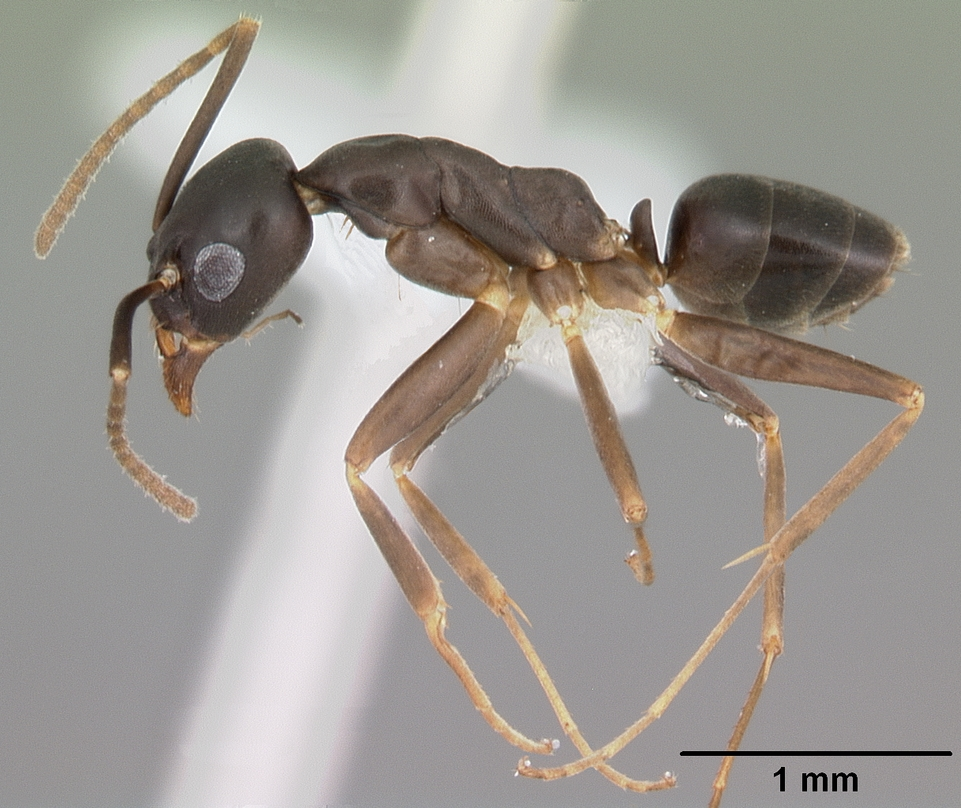
- G. pombero worker from Paraguay

Scientific classification
- Domain: Eukaryota
- Kingdom: Animalia
- Phylum: Arthropoda
- Class: Insecta
- Order: Hymenoptera
- Family: Formicidae
- Subfamily: Dolichoderinae
- Genus: Gracilidris
- Species: G. pombero

Binomial name
- Gracilidris pombero Wild & Cuezzo, 2006

= Gracilidris pombero =

Species of ant

Gracilidris pombero is a species of ant in the genus Gracilidris. Described by Wild and Cuezzo in 2006, the species is endemic to the South American countries of Argentina, Brazil and Paraguay.

== Etymology ==
In Guarani mythology, Pombero is a mythical humanoid creature that is nocturnal, and this is a reference to the ants' nocturnal behaviour.
