= Axinidris occidentalis =

Scientific classification
- Domain: Eukaryota
- Kingdom: Animalia
- Phylum: Arthropoda
- Class: Insecta
- Order: Hymenoptera
- Family: Formicidae
- Subfamily: Dolichoderinae
- Genus: Axinidris
- Species: A. occidentalis

Binomial name
- Axinidris occidentalis Shattuck, 1991

Species of ant

Axinidris occidentalis is a species of ant in the genus Axinidris. Described by Shattuck in 1991, the species is endemic to Liberia, and is known to live in habitats that other Axinidris ants prefer.
