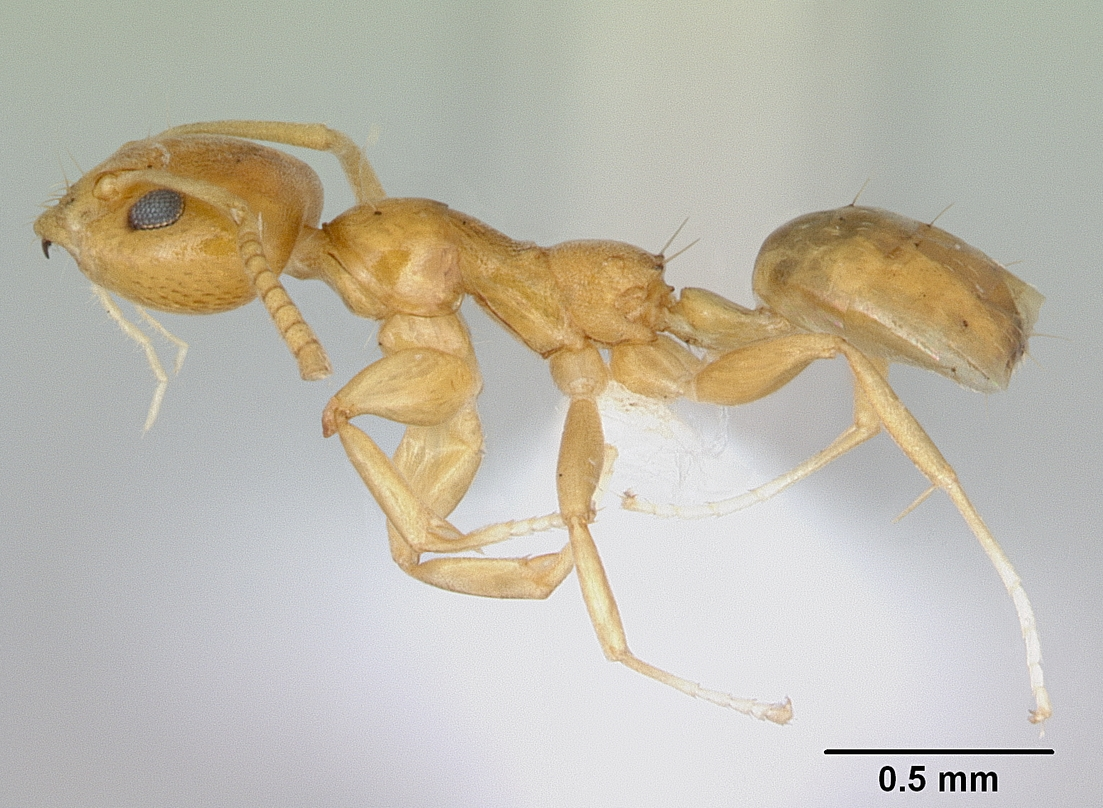

Scientific classification
- Domain: Eukaryota
- Kingdom: Animalia
- Phylum: Arthropoda
- Class: Insecta
- Order: Hymenoptera
- Family: Formicidae
- Subfamily: Dolichoderinae
- Genus: Axinidris
- Species: A. hypoclinoides

Binomial name
- Axinidris hypoclinoides (Santschi, 1919)

Synonyms
- Axinidris parvus Shattuck, 1991

= Axinidris hypoclinoides =

Species of ant

Axinidris hypoclinoides is a species of ant in the genus Axinidris. Described by Santschi in 1919, collected specimens are only known to be from forestry regions in several African countries.
