= Chronoxenus butteli =

Scientific classification
- Domain: Eukaryota
- Kingdom: Animalia
- Phylum: Arthropoda
- Class: Insecta
- Order: Hymenoptera
- Family: Formicidae
- Subfamily: Dolichoderinae
- Genus: Chronoxenus
- Species: C. butteli

Binomial name
- Chronoxenus butteli (Forel, 1913)

Species of ant

Chronoxenus butteli is an Indonesian ant of the genus Chronoxenus. It was once considered to be a part of the genus Iridomyrmex, and was moved from there to Chronoxenus. It was described by Forel in 1913.
