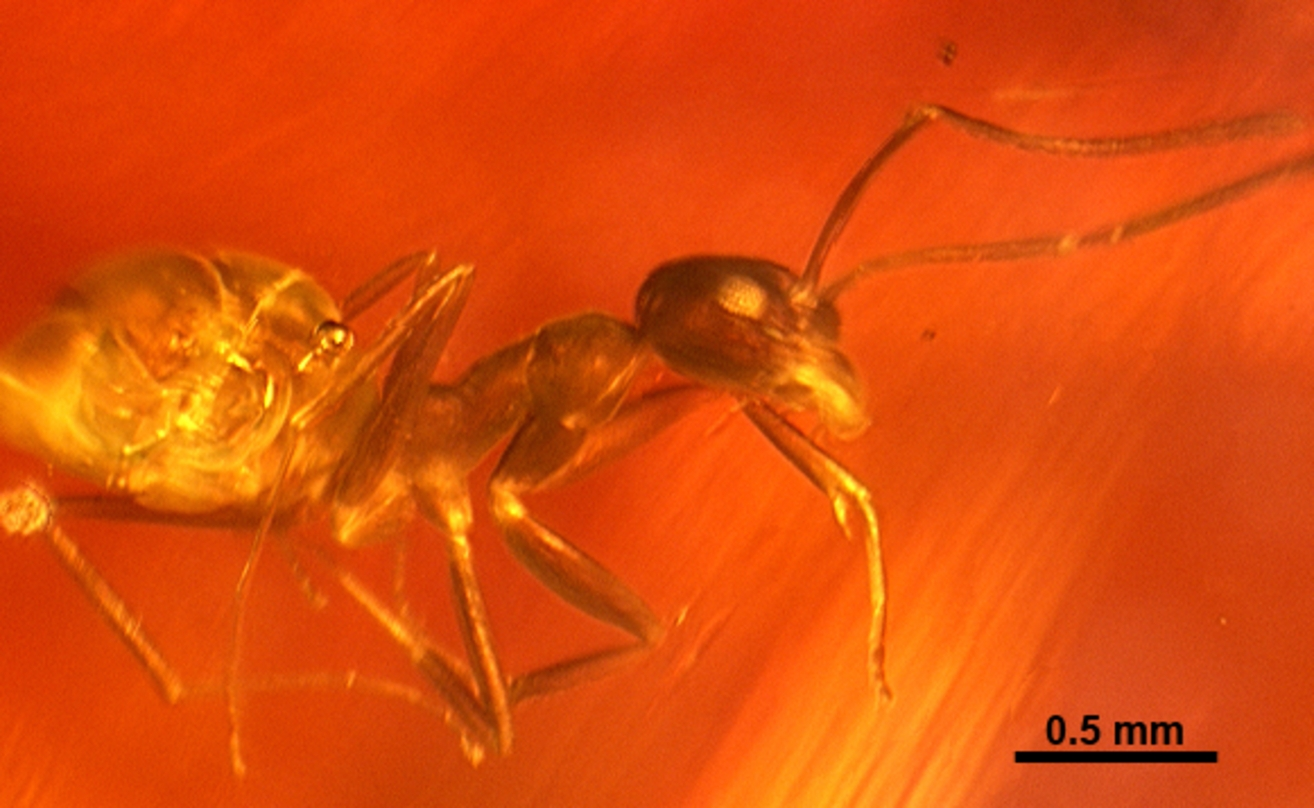

Scientific classification
- Domain: Eukaryota
- Kingdom: Animalia
- Phylum: Arthropoda
- Class: Insecta
- Order: Hymenoptera
- Family: Formicidae
- Subfamily: Dolichoderinae
- Genus: Gracilidris
- Species: G. humiloides

Binomial name
- Gracilidris humiloides (Wilson, 1985)

= Gracilidris humiloides =

†Gracilidris humiloides Temporal range: Early Miocene Dominican amber

Species of ant

Gracilidris humiloides is an extinct species of ant in the genus Gracilidris. It was discovered in the Dominican amber, only known from a single specimen, described by Wilson in 1985.

== Classification ==
Being only known from a single specimen described in 1985, the species was first placed in the genus Iridomyrmex. The genus was then revised in 1992, and a majority of New World ants were transferred to the genus Linepithema, including Gracilidris humiloides, although the species lacked apomorphies that defined the genus Linepithema. Due to position and shape of the eyes, length of the legs and other distinct features, the species has been placed in the genus Gracilidris in the subfamily Dolichoderinae.
