= Arnoldius scissor =

Scientific classification
- Kingdom: Animalia
- Phylum: Arthropoda
- Class: Insecta
- Order: Hymenoptera
- Family: Formicidae
- Subfamily: Dolichoderinae
- Genus: Arnoldius
- Species: A. scissor

Binomial name
- Arnoldius scissor (Crawley, 1922)

Species of ant

Arnoldius scissor is a species of ant, one of three species described in the genus Arnoldius. Native to Australia, it was described by Crawley in 1922.
