= Chronoxenus wroughtonii =

Scientific classification
- Domain: Eukaryota
- Kingdom: Animalia
- Phylum: Arthropoda
- Class: Insecta
- Order: Hymenoptera
- Family: Formicidae
- Subfamily: Dolichoderinae
- Genus: Chronoxenus
- Species: C. wroughtonii

Binomial name
- Chronoxenus wroughtonii (Forel, 1895)

Subspecies
- Chronoxenus wroughtonii formosensis (Forel, 1913); Chronoxenus wroughtonii javanus (Forel, 1909); Chronoxenus wroughtonii victoriae (Forel, 1895)

Species of ant

Chronoxenus wroughtonii is a species of ant of the genus Chronoxenus. It was described by Forel in 1895, and was once a part of the genus Iridomyrmex. They are endemic to China, India and South Korea.

== Subspecies ==
Chronoxenus wroughtonii has three subspecies:

- Chronoxenus wroughtonii formosensis (Forel, 1913)
- Chronoxenus wroughtonii javanus (Forel, 1909)
- Chronoxenus wroughtonii victoriae (Forel, 1895)
