= Arnoldius pusillus =

Scientific classification
- Kingdom: Animalia
- Phylum: Arthropoda
- Clade: Pancrustacea
- Class: Insecta
- Order: Hymenoptera
- Family: Formicidae
- Subfamily: Dolichoderinae
- Genus: Arnoldius
- Species: A. pusillus

Binomial name
- Arnoldius pusillus (Mayr, 1876)

Species of ant

Arnoldius pusillus is a species of ant part of the genus Arnoldius, which is only one of the three species described in it. The species is distributed in Australia. It was described by Mayr in 1876.

== Subspecies ==
- Arnoldius pusillus aequalis (Forel, 1902)
