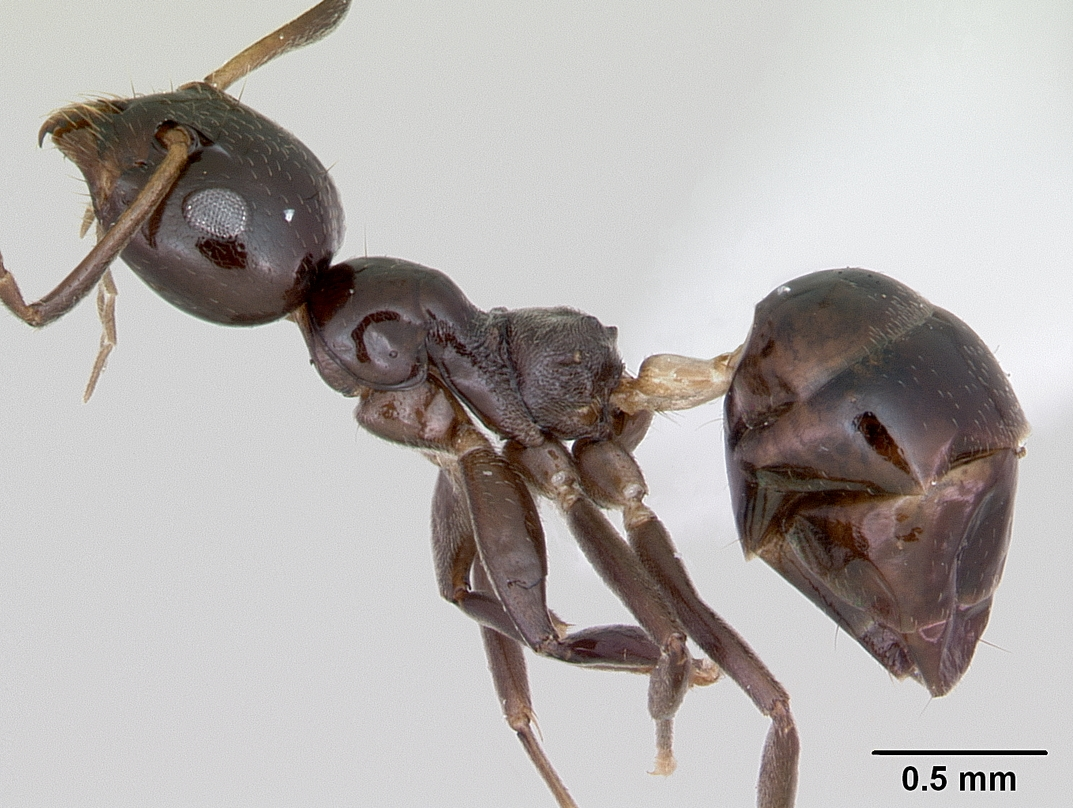

Scientific classification
- Domain: Eukaryota
- Kingdom: Animalia
- Phylum: Arthropoda
- Class: Insecta
- Order: Hymenoptera
- Family: Formicidae
- Subfamily: Dolichoderinae
- Genus: Axinidris
- Species: A. gabonica

Binomial name
- Axinidris gabonica Snelling, R.R., 2007

= Axinidris gabonica =

Species of ant

Axinidris gabonica is a species of ant in the genus Axinidris. Described by Snelling in 2007, the species is known to inhabit forests in Gabon.
