= Axinidris denticulata =

Scientific classification
- Domain: Eukaryota
- Kingdom: Animalia
- Phylum: Arthropoda
- Class: Insecta
- Order: Hymenoptera
- Family: Formicidae
- Subfamily: Dolichoderinae
- Genus: Axinidris
- Species: A. denticulata

Binomial name
- Axinidris denticulata (Wheeler, W.M., 1922)

Species of ant

Axinidris denticulata is a species of ant in the genus Axinidris. Described by William Morton Wheeler in 1922, the species is endemic to the Democratic Republic of Congo.
