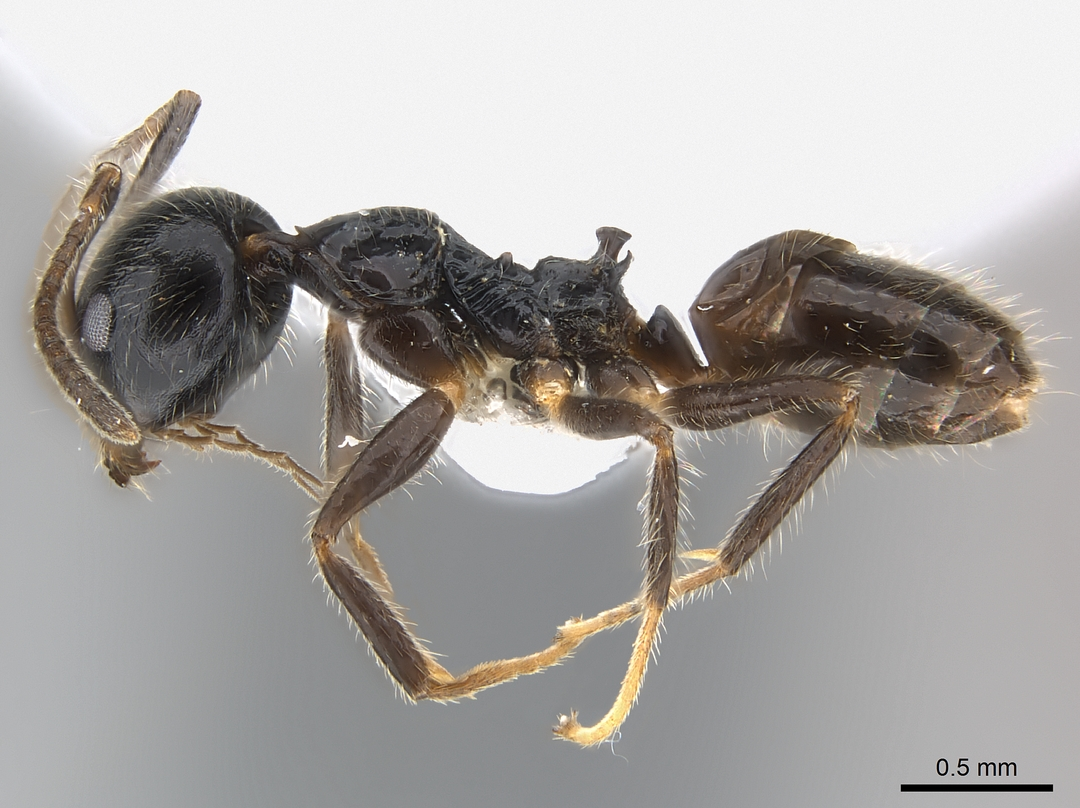

Scientific classification
- Domain: Eukaryota
- Kingdom: Animalia
- Phylum: Arthropoda
- Class: Insecta
- Order: Hymenoptera
- Family: Formicidae
- Subfamily: Dolichoderinae
- Genus: Axinidris
- Species: A. acholli

Binomial name
- Axinidris acholli Weber, 1941

= Axinidris acholli =

Species of ant

Axinidris acholli is a species of ant in the genus Axinidris. Described by Weber in 1941, the species is endemic to Kenya and Sudan, where specimens originally collected were observed foraging. above ground vegetation
