= Axinidris kakamegensis =

Scientific classification
- Domain: Eukaryota
- Kingdom: Animalia
- Phylum: Arthropoda
- Class: Insecta
- Order: Hymenoptera
- Family: Formicidae
- Subfamily: Dolichoderinae
- Genus: Axinidris
- Species: A. kakamegensis

Binomial name
- Axinidris kakamegensis Shattuck, 1991

Species of ant

Axinidris kakamegensis is a species of ant in the genus Axinidris. Described by Shattuck in 1991, the species is endemic to Kenya, where it was only in an unknown area of the Kakamega Forest.
