= Axinidris hylekoites =

Scientific classification
- Domain: Eukaryota
- Kingdom: Animalia
- Phylum: Arthropoda
- Class: Insecta
- Order: Hymenoptera
- Family: Formicidae
- Subfamily: Dolichoderinae
- Genus: Axinidris
- Species: A. hylekoites

Binomial name
- Axinidris hylekoites Shattuck, 1991

Species of ant

Axinidris hylekoites is a species of ant in the genus Axinidris. Described by Shattuck in 1991, the species is endemic to Ghana, where it was only observed in a rotten tree branch.
