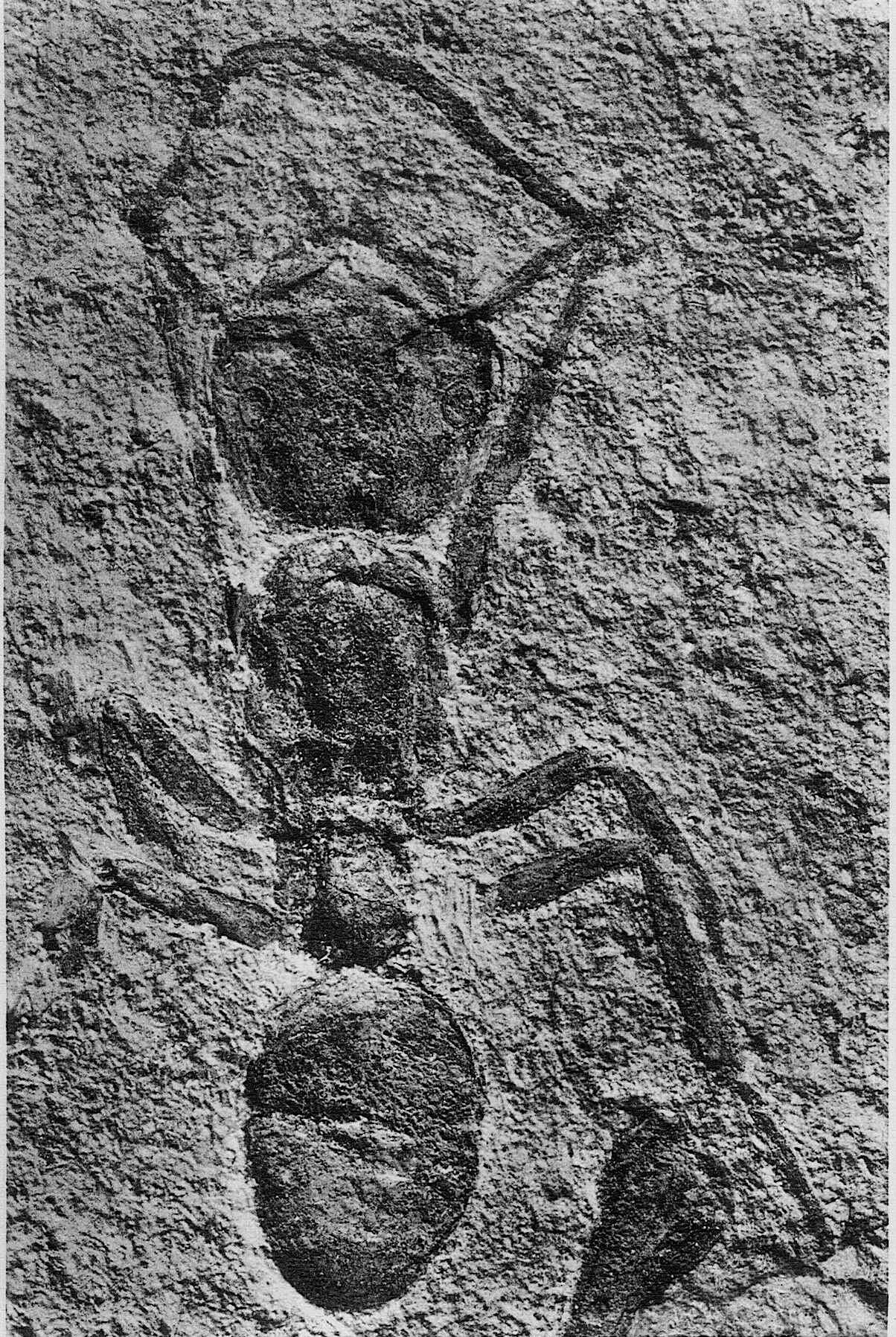
- Holotype of Archiponera wheeleri

Scientific classification
- Kingdom: Animalia
- Phylum: Arthropoda
- Class: Insecta
- Order: Hymenoptera
- Family: Formicidae
- Subfamily: Ponerinae
- Genus: †Archiponera; Carpenter, 1930
- Species: †A. wheeleri

Binomial name
- †Archiponera wheeleri Carpenter, 1930

= Archiponera =

Archiponera Temporal range: Priabonian

Extinct genus of ants

Archiponera is an extinct genus of ant in the formicid subfamily Ponerinae. The genus contains a single described species, Archiponera wheeleri known from several Late Eocene fossils which were found in North America.

== History and classification ==
When described the genus Archiponera was known from a single pair of fossils preserved as an impression in fine shale of the Florissant formation in Colorado. No further specimens have been reported since that time. The formation is composed of successive lake deposits which have preserved a diverse assemblage of insects. The insects and plants suggest a climate similar to modern Southeastern North America, with a number of taxa represented that are now found in the subtropics to tropics and confined to the old world. When Archiponera was described, the Florissant formation was considered to be Miocene in age, based on the flora and fauna preserved. Successive research and fossil descriptions moved the age older and by 1985 the formation had been reassigned to an Oligocene age. Further refinement of the formation's age using radiometric dating of sanidine crystals has resulted in an age of 34 million years old. This places the formation in the Eocene Priabonian stage.

At the time of description, the holotype worker and allotype male of A. wheeleri were deposited in the Museum of Comparative Zoology paleontology collections at Harvard University. The fossils were first studied by paleoentomologist Frank M. Carpenter of the Museum of Comparative Zoology. His 1930 type description of the new genus and species was published in the Bulletin of the Museum of Comparative Zoology. When described, Carpenter noted perceived similarities between Archiponera and the modern genera Streblognathus and Dinoponera, suggesting that the two modern genera were the closest relatives of Archiponera. Wheeler suggested that Streblognathus and Dinoponera, at that time each known from a single described species, were members of a close generic grouping, or "super genus", which prior to the Pleistocene ice age, was a tropicopolitan, with Archiponera being a northern member of the group. However, molecular data analysis has shown that while Streblognathus and Dinoponera show general morphological similarities, they are not closely related as suggested by Wheeler, and the relationship status of Archiponera is not known. Archiponera is one of eleven extinct Ponerinae genera described as of 2012.

== Description ==
In general, Archiponera specimens have large heads with rounded sides and small, uncurved mandibles. The clypeus is large in proportion to the head, with a forward margin that has a cleft in the middle and a rearward margin with a large lobe present. The eyes are similar in placement and size to that seen in Streblognathus and Dinoponera, being smaller and positioned high on the head capsule. The twelve segmented antennae are long, with a scape that extends past the rear of the head capsule. The gaster is notably rounded and small at 5.0 mm (0.20 in) long, being nearly the same size as the 4.5 mm (0.18 in) long head. The workers have an overall length of 15.0 mm (0.59 in) with a thorax of about 1.0 mm (0.039 in). The male is overall smaller than the known worker, with an estimated length of 13.0 mm (0.51 in), a condition that is seen in Dinoponera species. The wings of the male are 6.0 mm (0.24 in) long and bearing two cubital cells.
