= Axinidris stageri =

Scientific classification
- Domain: Eukaryota
- Kingdom: Animalia
- Phylum: Arthropoda
- Class: Insecta
- Order: Hymenoptera
- Family: Formicidae
- Subfamily: Dolichoderinae
- Genus: Axinidris
- Species: A. stageri

Binomial name
- Axinidris stageri Snelling, R.R., 2007

Species of ant

Axinidris stageri is a species of ant in the genus Axinidris. Described by Snelling in 2007, the species is endemic to Tanzania.

== Etymology ==
The species was named after Dr. Kenneth E. Stager, to honour him for his work on ants he collected from around the world.
