= Ravavy indicus =

Scientific classification
- Kingdom: Animalia
- Phylum: Arthropoda
- Class: Insecta
- Order: Hymenoptera
- Family: Formicidae
- Subfamily: Dolichoderinae
- Genus: Ravavy
- Species: R. indicus

Binomial name
- Ravavy indicus (Forel, 1895)

Subspecies
- Ravavy indicus timidus (Santschi, 1928)

Species of ant

Ravavy indicus is a species of ant in the genus Ravavy. Described by Forel in 1895, the species is endemic to various countries in Asia. Originally described in Tapinoma, it was transferred to the genus Ravavy in 2025.
