= Chronoxenus dalyi =

Scientific classification
- Domain: Eukaryota
- Kingdom: Animalia
- Phylum: Arthropoda
- Class: Insecta
- Order: Hymenoptera
- Family: Formicidae
- Subfamily: Dolichoderinae
- Genus: Chronoxenus
- Species: C. dalyi

Binomial name
- Chronoxenus dalyi (Forel, 1895)

Species of ant

Chronoxenus dalyi is a species of ant of the genus Chronoxenus. It was described by Forel in 1895. The ant is endemic to Bangladesh, India, Nepal and China.
