= Chronoxenus walshi =

Scientific classification
- Domain: Eukaryota
- Kingdom: Animalia
- Phylum: Arthropoda
- Class: Insecta
- Order: Hymenoptera
- Family: Formicidae
- Subfamily: Dolichoderinae
- Genus: Chronoxenus
- Species: C. walshi

Binomial name
- Chronoxenus walshi (Forel, 1895)

Species of ant

Chronoxenus walshi is a species of ant of the genus Chronoxenus. It was described by Forel in 1895, and was formerly a part of the genus Iridomyrmex. They are endemic to Bangladesh, India and China.
