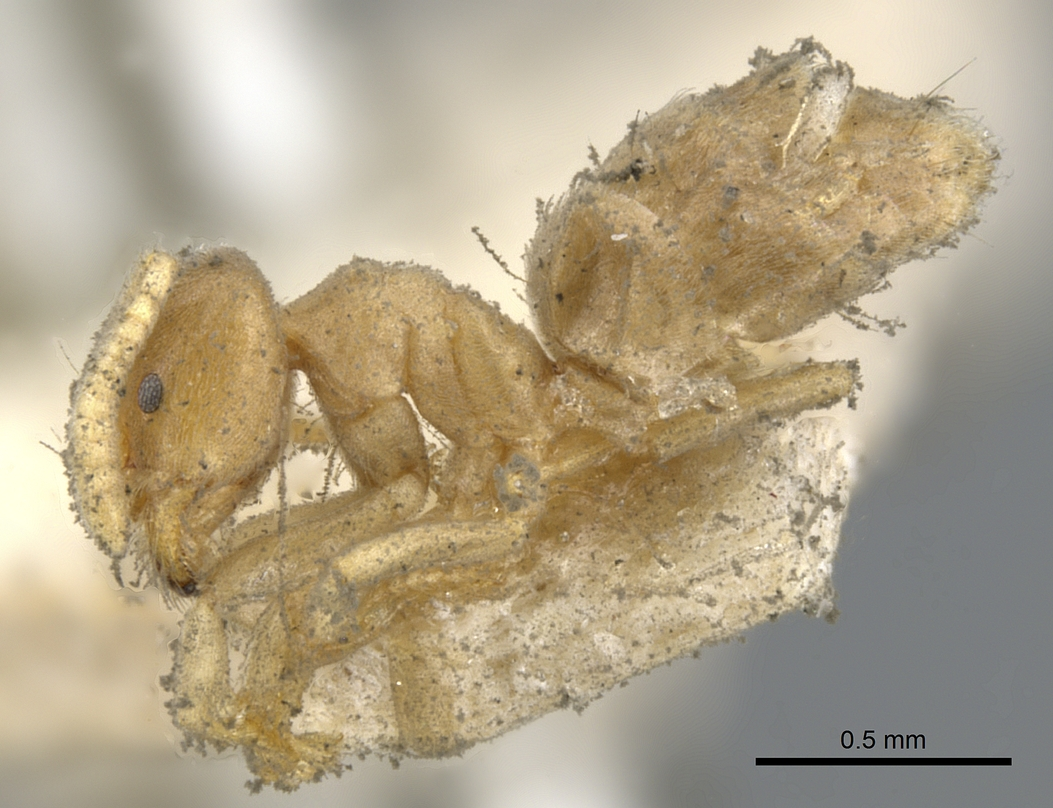

Scientific classification
- Domain: Eukaryota
- Kingdom: Animalia
- Phylum: Arthropoda
- Class: Insecta
- Order: Hymenoptera
- Family: Formicidae
- Subfamily: Dolichoderinae
- Genus: Chronoxenus
- Species: C. myops

Binomial name
- Chronoxenus myops (Forel, 1895)

Synonyms
- Liometopum minimum Zhou, 2001

= Chronoxenus myops =

Species of ant

Chronoxenus myops is a species of ant of the genus Chronoxenus. It was described by Forel in 1895.
