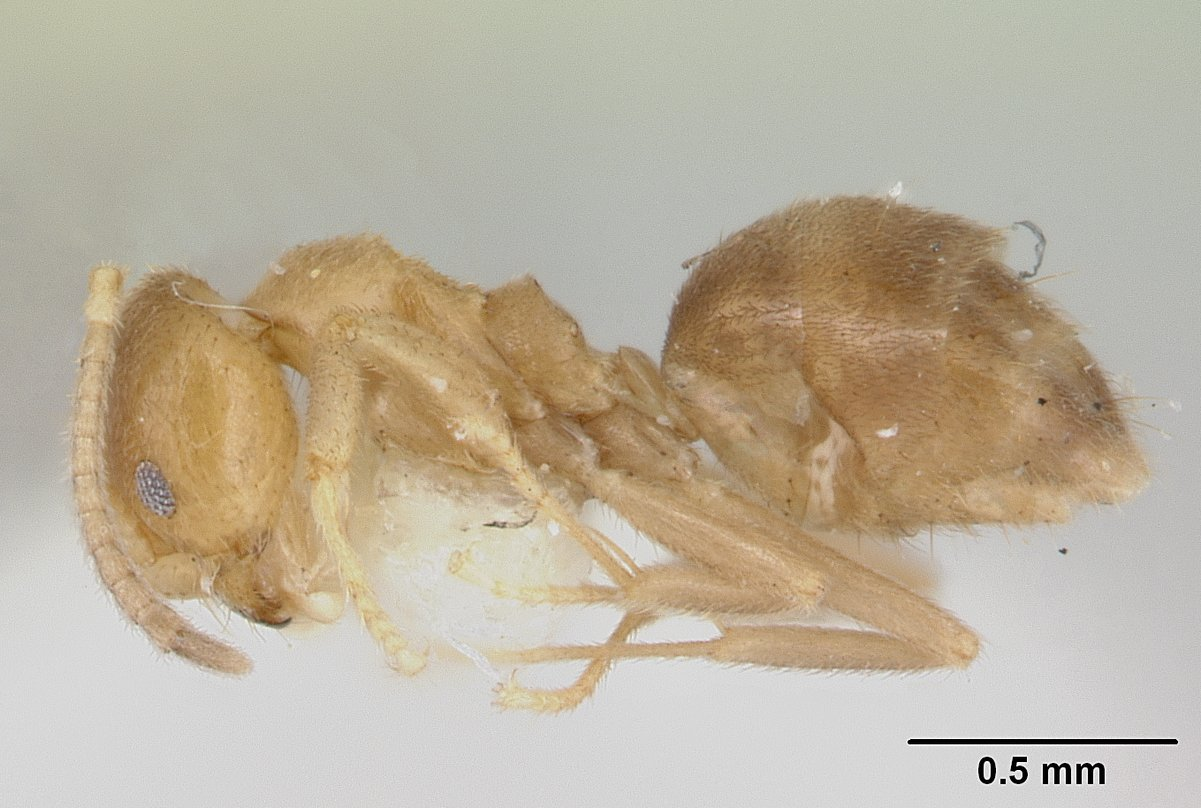
- Loweriella boltoni worker

Scientific classification
- Domain: Eukaryota
- Kingdom: Animalia
- Phylum: Arthropoda
- Class: Insecta
- Order: Hymenoptera
- Family: Formicidae
- Subfamily: Dolichoderinae
- Tribe: Bothriomyrmecini
- Genus: Loweriella; Shattuck, 1992
- Species: L. boltoni

Binomial name
- Loweriella boltoni Shattuck, 1992

= Loweriella =

Genus of ants

Loweriella boltoni is a species of ant and is the only known species of genus Loweriella. The species is only known from workers collected in the rainforest in Sarawak, Malaysia.
