= Aphaenogaster donisthorpei =

Aphaenogaster donisthorpei Temporal range: Priabonian

Scientific classification
- Domain: Eukaryota
- Kingdom: Animalia
- Phylum: Arthropoda
- Class: Insecta
- Order: Hymenoptera
- Family: Formicidae
- Subfamily: Myrmicinae
- Genus: Aphaenogaster
- Species: †A. donisthorpei

Binomial name
- †Aphaenogaster donisthorpei Carpenter, 1930

Extinct species of ant

Aphaenogaster donisthorpei is an extinct species of ant in formicid subfamily Myrmicinae known from a Late Eocene fossil from North America. A. donisthorpei was one of two Aphaenogaster species described in the 1930 paper.

== History and classification ==
Aphaenogaster donisthorpei is known from a solitary fossil insect which is a compression-impression fossil preserved in fine shales of the Florissant formation in Colorado. The formation is composed of successive lake deposits which have preserved a diverse assemblage of insects. The insects and plants suggest a climate similar to modern Southeastern North America, with a number of taxa represented that are now found in the subtropics to tropics and confined to the old world. When A. donisthorpei was described, the Florissant formation was considered to be Miocene in age, based on the flora and fauna preserved. Subsequent research and fossil descriptions re-examined the dating, and by 1985 the formation had been reassigned to an Oligocene age. Further refinement of the formation's age using radiometric dating of sanidine crystals has resulted in an age of 34 million years old. This places the formation in the Late Eocene Priabonian stage.

At the time of description the holotype specimen, number 2917 was deposited in the Museum of Comparative Zoology paleontology collections at Harvard University. Along with a number of other insect type specimens, the A. donisthorpei holotype is part of the Samuel Hubbard Scudder insect collection donated to Harvard in 1902. The fossil was first studied by paleoentomologist Frank M. Carpenter of the Museum of Comparative Zoology; in 1930 his type description of the new species was published in the Bulletin of the Museum of Comparative Zoology. The etymology for the specific epithet donisthorpei was not specified with the type description, but Horace Donisthorpe (1870–1951) was a British myrmecologist and coleopterist. A. donisthorpei was one of two Aphaenogaster species from the Florissant Formation that Carpenter described in the paper, the other species being Aphaenogaster mayri.

== Description ==
The Aphaenogaster donisthorpei specimen is a partially preserved queen caste adult which was fossilized with its dorsal side facing upwards and the attached wings outspread. The overall length of the queen is approximately 7.0 millimetres (0.28 in), the head has an estimated length of 1.9 millimetres (0.075 in) and the thorax is estimated at 2.5 millimetres (0.098 in). The antennae are long and slender in appearance, composed of a scape that is extends past the hind margin of the head and funicular segments which are twice as long are they are wide. The preserved forewing is 6 millimetres (0.24 in) long and has venation similar to that of A. mayri. The two are distinguished based on the more slender nature of A. donisthorpei with longer head and thorax proportions.
