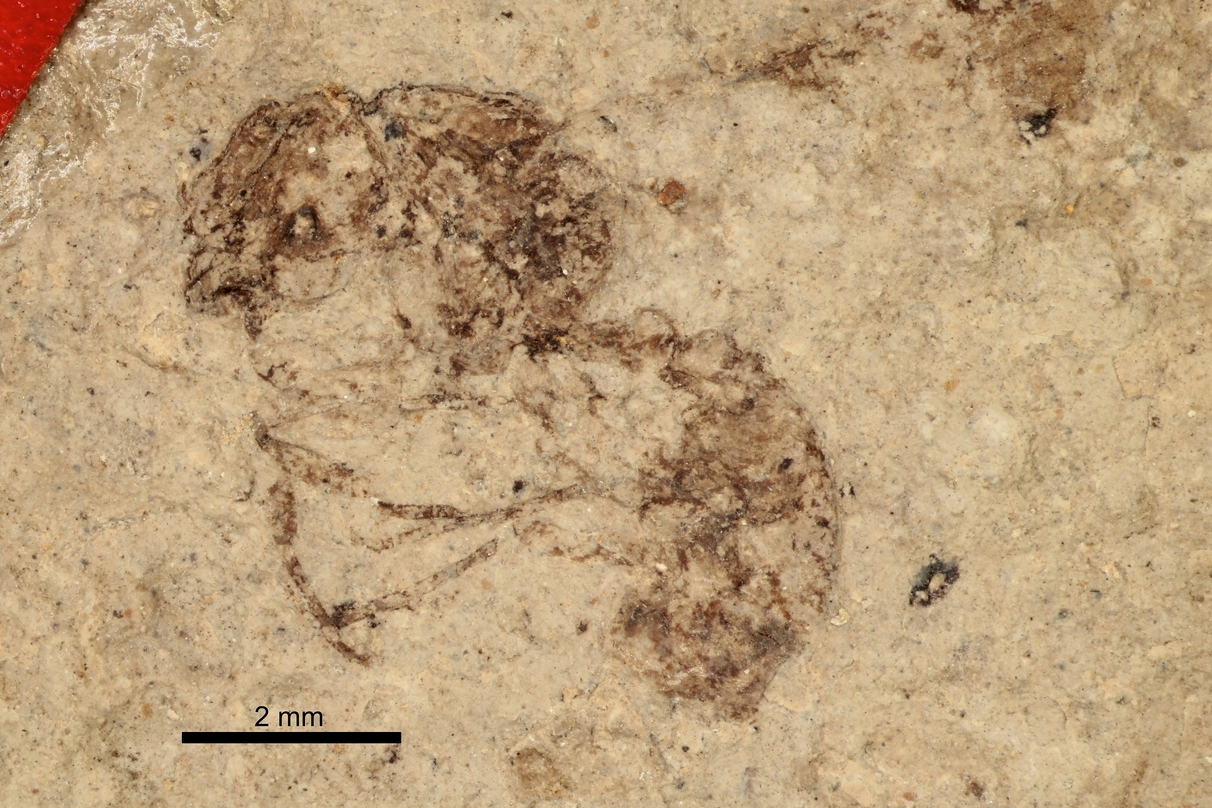
- Aphaenogaster mayri paratype BMNHP27352

Scientific classification
- Domain: Eukaryota
- Kingdom: Animalia
- Phylum: Arthropoda
- Class: Insecta
- Order: Hymenoptera
- Family: Formicidae
- Subfamily: Myrmicinae
- Genus: Aphaenogaster
- Species: †A. mayri

Binomial name
- †Aphaenogaster mayri Carpenter, 1930

= Aphaenogaster mayri =

Aphaenogaster mayri Temporal range: Priabonian

Extinct species of ant

Aphaenogaster mayri is an extinct species of ant in formicid subfamily Myrmicinae known from a series of Late Eocene fossils found in North America. A. mayri was one of two Aphaenogaster species described in a 1930 paper by Frank M. Carpenter.

== History and classification ==
Aphaenogaster mayri is known from a series of fossil insects which are compression-impression fossils preserved in fine shales of the Florissant formation in Colorado. The formation is composed of successive lake deposits which have preserved a diverse assemblage of insects. The insects and plants suggest a climate similar to modern southeastern North America, with a number of taxa represented that are now found in the subtropics to tropics and confined to the Old World. When A. mayri was described, the Florissant formation was considered to be Miocene in age, based on the flora and fauna preserved. Successive research and fossil descriptions moved the age older and by 1985 the formation had been reassigned to an Oligocene age. Further refinement of the formation's age using radiometric dating of sanidine crystals has resulted in an age of 34 million years old. This places the formation in the Eocene Priabonian stage.

At the time of description the species was known from a series of forty-one type fossils and over two hundred good fossils were examined for the species description. The holotype was deposited in the Museum of Comparative Zoology paleontology collections at Harvard University. Along with a number of other insect type specimens, the A. mayri holotype is part of the Samuel Hubbard Scudder insect collection donated to Harvard in 1902. The fossil was first studied by paleoentomologist Frank M. Carpenter of the Museum of Comparative Zoology with his 1930 type description of the new species being published in the Bulletin of the Museum of Comparative Zoology. The etymology for the specific epithet mayri was not given with the type description, but is likely in honour of the Austrian entomologist Gustav Mayr. A. mayri was one of two Aphaenogaster species which Carpenter described in the paper, the other species being Aphaenogaster donisthorpei, both from the Florissant Formation.

== Description ==
The Aphaenogaster mayri queens range from 7.0 to 8.0 millimetres (0.28 to 0.31 in), with a fairly slender build. Body segment lengths are 2.1 millimetres (0.083 in) for the head, 2.5 millimetres (0.098 in) for the thorax and 3.0 millimetres (0.12 in) for the gaster. The head capsule is a little longer than it is wide and has a large pair of mandibles. The antennae are long and slender in appearance, composed of a scape that is extends past the hind margin of the head and funicular segments which are twice as long are they are wide. Both the head and thorax show visible distinct sculpturing. Male A. mayri are distinguished from queens by their smaller size, being around 6.0 millimetres (0.24 in) in length and having a head capsule with a triangular outline. Similarly the workers are distinct from queens by the smaller size, with a length of approximately 6.0 millimetres (0.24 in) and heavier sculpturing on the head capsule and thorax then queens. The head capsule has the same outline as that of the queens, distinguishing workers from males. A. mayri and A. donisthorpei are distinguished based on the more slender nature of A. donisthorpei, with more elongated head and thorax proportions.
