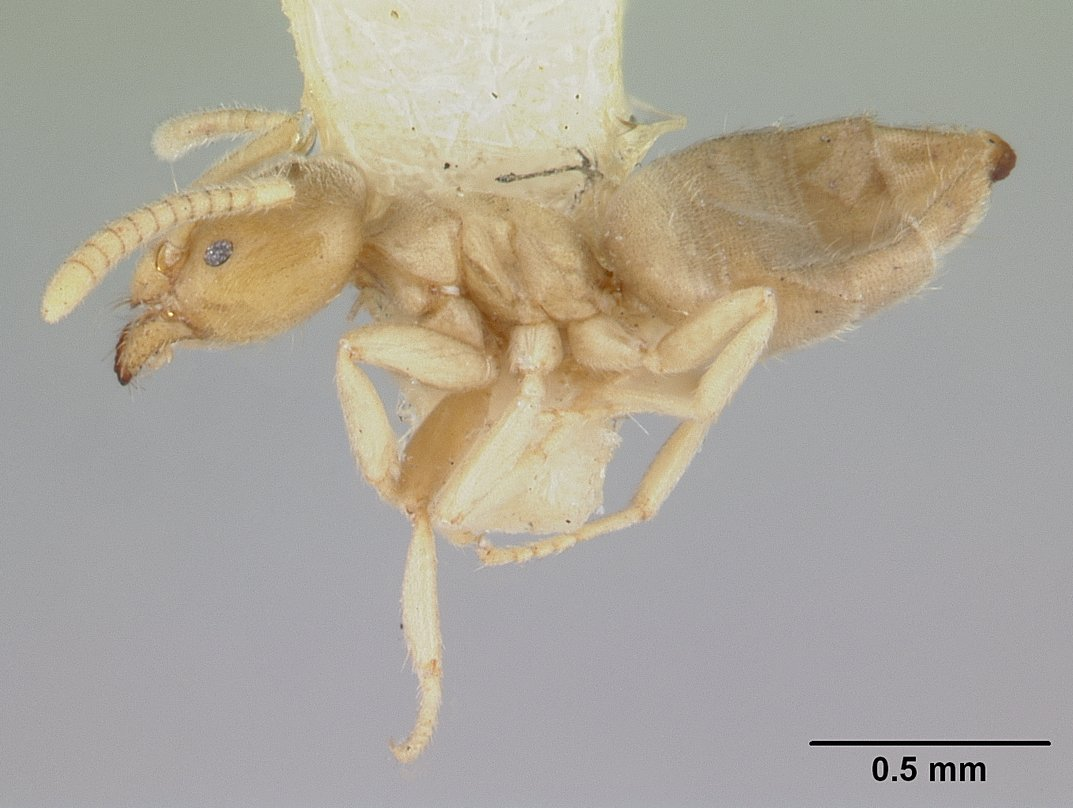
- Arnoldius flavus worker from Australia

Scientific classification
- Kingdom: Animalia
- Phylum: Arthropoda
- Class: Insecta
- Order: Hymenoptera
- Family: Formicidae
- Subfamily: Dolichoderinae
- Tribe: Bothriomyrmecini
- Genus: Arnoldius; Dubovikov, 2005

Type species
- Bothriomyrmex flavus Crawley, 1922

Diversity
- 3 species

= Arnoldius =

Genus of ants

Arnoldius is a genus of ants in the subfamily Dolichoderinae. Its three species are known from Australia.

== Species ==
- Arnoldius flavus (Crawley, 1922)
- Arnoldius pusillus (Mayr, 1876)
- Arnoldius scissor (Crawley, 1922)
