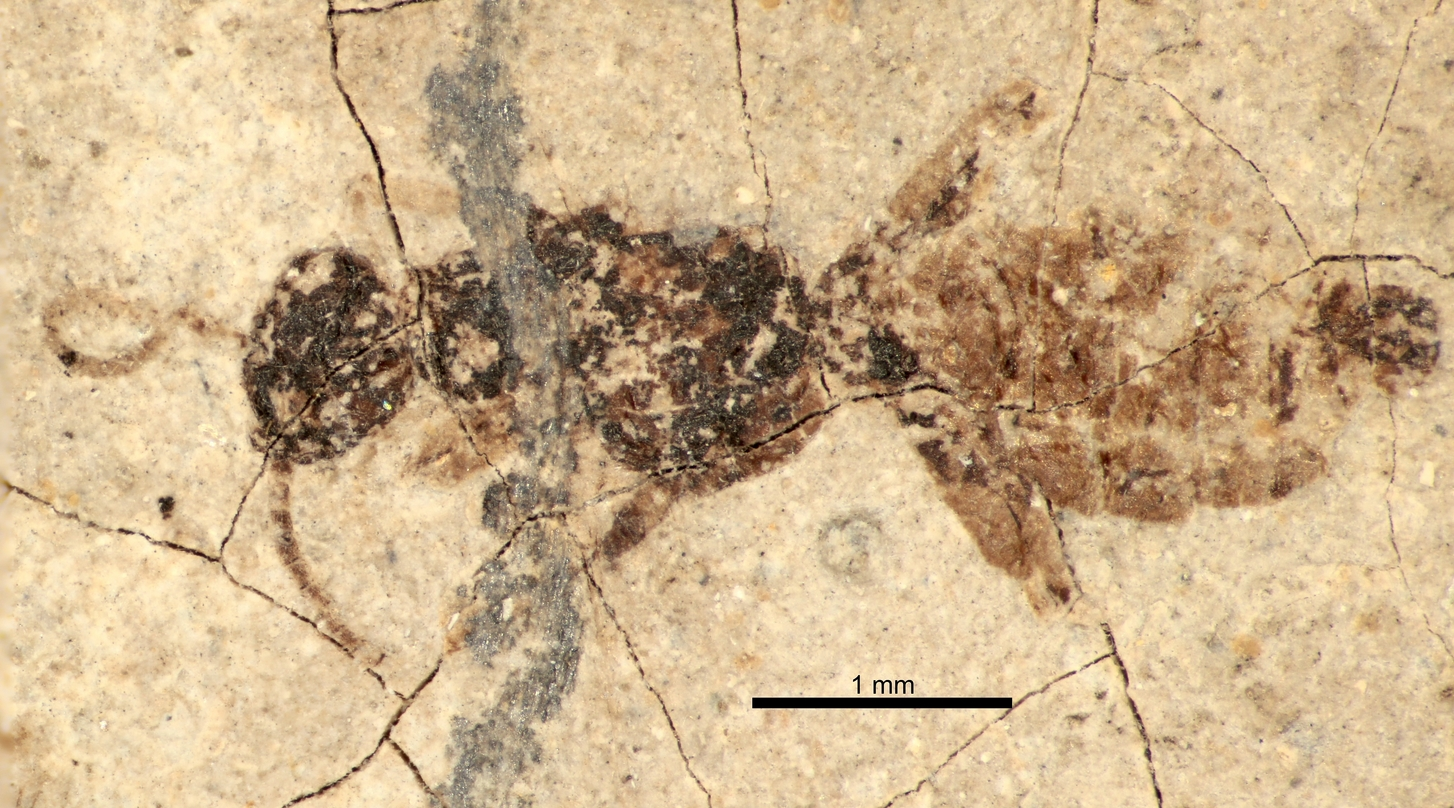
- Paratype queen in the British Museum

Scientific classification
- Domain: Eukaryota
- Kingdom: Animalia
- Phylum: Arthropoda
- Class: Insecta
- Order: Hymenoptera
- Family: Formicidae
- Subfamily: Dolichoderinae
- Genus: Dolichoderus
- Species: †D. rohweri

Binomial name
- †Dolichoderus rohweri Carpenter, 1930

= Dolichoderus rohweri =

Dolichoderus rohweri Temporal range: Late Eocene

Species of ant

Dolichoderus rohweri is an extinct species of ant in the genus Dolichoderus. Described by Carpenter in 1930, the fossils of this species are only found in the Florissant Formation, Colorado.
