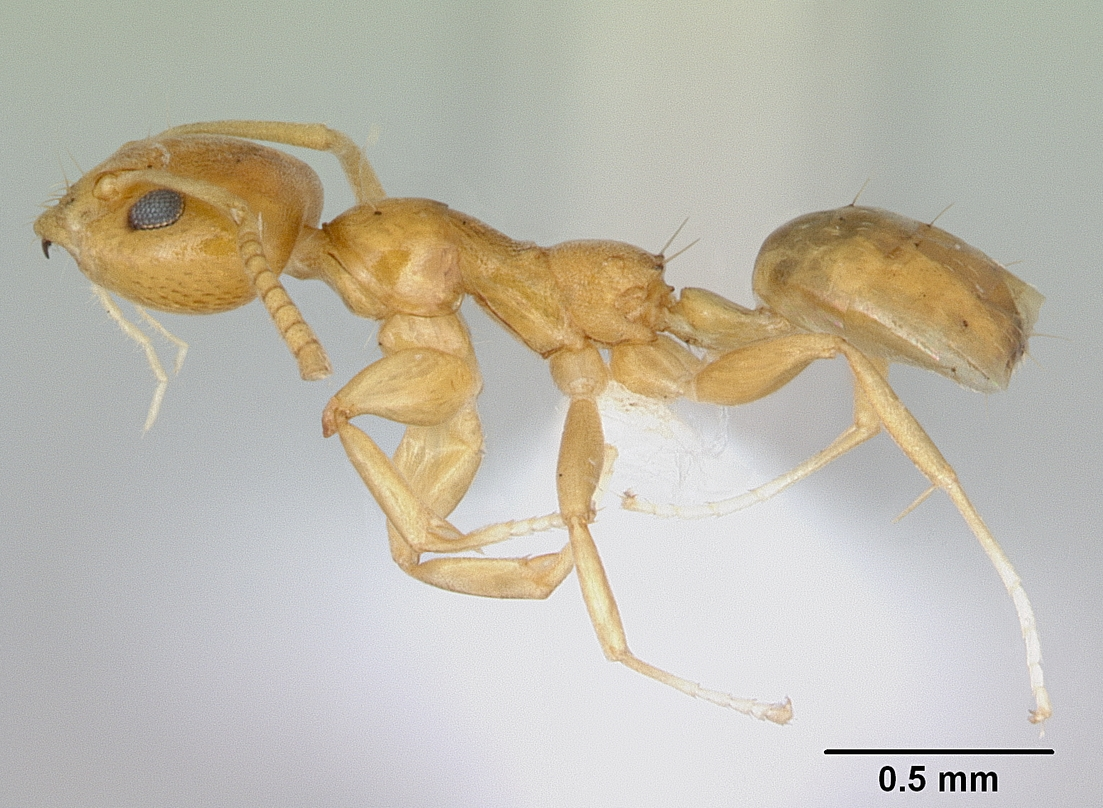
- Axinidris hypoclinoides worker

Scientific classification
- Kingdom: Animalia
- Phylum: Arthropoda
- Class: Insecta
- Order: Hymenoptera
- Family: Formicidae
- Subfamily: Dolichoderinae
- Tribe: Tapinomini
- Genus: Axinidris; Weber, 1941

Type species
- Axinidris acholli

Diversity
- 21 species

= Axinidris =

Genus of ants

Axinidris is a genus of arboreal ants in the subfamily Dolichoderinae. The genus is known from forested areas the Afrotropics, where they nest in hollow stems or rotten wood. They forage mainly in trees, but occasionally on the ground.

== Species ==
- Axinidris acholli Weber, 1941
- Axinidris bidens Shattuck, 1991
- Axinidris denticulata (Wheeler, 1922)
- Axinidris gabonica Snelling, 2007
- Axinidris ghanensis Shattuck, 1991
- Axinidris hylekoites Shattuck, 1991
- Axinidris hypoclinoides (Santschi, 1919)
- Axinidris icipe Snelling, 2007
- Axinidris kakamegensis Shattuck, 1991
- Axinidris kinoin Shattuck, 1991
- Axinidris lignicola Snelling, 2007
- Axinidris luhya Snelling, 2007
- Axinidris mlalu Snelling, 2007
- Axinidris murielae Shattuck, 1991
- Axinidris namib Snelling, 2007
- Axinidris nigripes Shattuck, 1991
- Axinidris occidentalis Shattuck, 1991
- Axinidris okekai Snelling, 2007
- Axinidris palligastrion Shattuck, 1991
- Axinidris stageri Snelling, 2007
- Axinidris tridens (Arnold, 1946)
