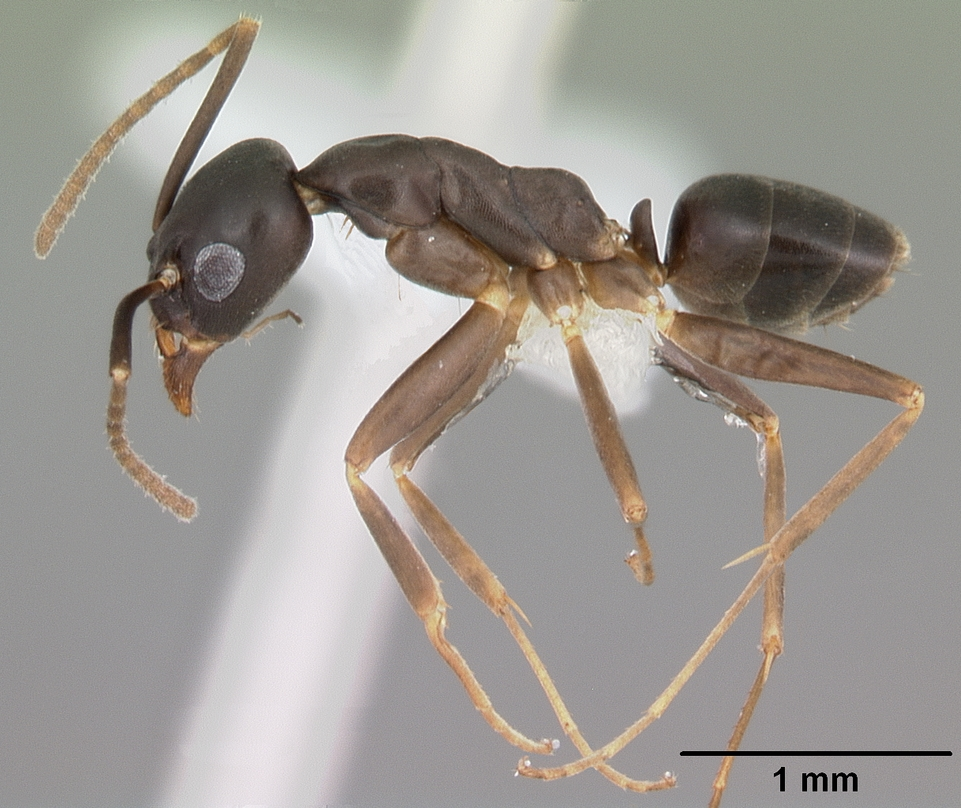
- G. pombero worker from Paraguay

Scientific classification
- Kingdom: Animalia
- Phylum: Arthropoda
- Clade: Pancrustacea
- Class: Insecta
- Order: Hymenoptera
- Family: Formicidae
- Subfamily: Dolichoderinae
- Tribe: Leptomyrmecini
- Genus: Gracilidris; Wild & Cuezzo, 2006

Type species
- Gracilidris pombero

Diversity
- 2 species

= Gracilidris =

Gracilidris Temporal range: Early Miocene to Recent, ~20–0 Ma

Genus of ants

Gracilidris is a genus of dolichoderine ants with nocturnal behaviour; thought to have gone extinct 15-20 million years ago, they have been found in Paraguay, Brazil, and Argentina and were described in 2006.

== Discovery of G. pombero ==
For the first time, it was recorded that the dolichoderine ant genus Gracilidris and its sole species, G. pombero were found in the Colombia Amazon basin.

Additional research on the Colombian Amazon Basin was conducted by the Department of Caqueta in Colombia in regard to the distribution of the Gracilidris genus. The department formed a Project called “Amaz_BD: Biodiversidad de los paisajes Amazónicos, determinantes socio-económicos y producción de bienes y servicios” to collect ant specimen from different areas of the Colombian Amazon Basin due to human effect such as logging on other areas. The extraction of these ant species consisted of topsoil sampling of 25 cm^2 in area by 10 cm deep. The samples were then placed into containers where they were preserved in ethyl alcohol. The Caqueta found this method to be uncommon which caused damage to the sample but was crucial in obtaining multiple samples. However, although the samples were damaged, they still could be identified through their unique characteristics. These samples were then taken to multiple institutions such as California Academy of Sciences, San Francisco, California, U.S.A. (CASC); Instituto de Ciencias Naturales, Universidad Nacional de Colombia, Bogotá D.C., Colombia (ICN); Museo de Entomología de la Universidad del Valle, Santiago de Cali, Valle del Cauca, Colombia (MEUV) for thorough research. During the identification of these specimens, a few individuals by the names of Wild and Cuezzo, were able to capture images of the Gracilidris pombero. After the research was completed at these institutions, it was concluded that the Gracilidris pombero derived from open areas in the western foothills of the Colombian Amazon basin. Moreover, G. pombero species from Colombia present similarities in behavior with the populations of Argentina, Brazil, and Paraguay. There were also physical differences found within the specimen of each sample. It was stated that the marginal ridge of the Colombian ants is straight with yellow to brown trochanters, while the Paraguayan and Brazilian ants have a smooth concavity with dark brown body parts. However, Gracilidris in Colombia is quite a rare sight due to their limited distribution and particularity. The hypothesis formed by this data is that the Amazon Basin creates a barrier for the dolichoderine ants, and because of climate change plus the evolution of the Amazon wet forest, this leads to the inevitable extinction of these ants. Furthermore, another hypothesis this the shift in the Amazon rivers, causing yet another barrier that separates the genus G. humiliodes and G. Pombero. These are just a few reasons as to what caused the distribution and potential extinction of the Gracilidris genus.

Furthermore, another group of workers assessed Gracilidris specimens at a few sites in Paraguay, Argentina, and the central and northeastern regions of Brazil. Their findings concluded with observations of the G. pombero species being present in the south of Brazil. This species tends to flourish in dry habitats like grasslands but has been found near Colombia, as discussed in the previous research project. Robert Guerrero concluded that during the Holocene when (Puerto Rico- Paraguay & Amazon) the climate was dense with rain, the genus became isolated, resulting in multiple species in the Colombian Amazon. In this study, the researchers conducted records of the G. pombero species through the collection of many ground-dwelling ants near the South American savanna of Brazil. This method was chosen based on the previous failed attempts with other methods. The researchers located a total of 43 new records of G. pombero in Brazil (Koch 2018). Overall, the Gracilidris genus contained a highly dense population of ants, however, climate change drastically affected that, thus, making the genus rare to humans.

The single existing fossil in Dominican amber makes the genus a Lazarus taxon. The only known extant species, Gracilidris pombero, nests in small colonies in the soil. These ants have been described only very recently and little is known about them.

== Species ==
- †Gracilidris humiloides (Wilson, 1985)
- Gracilidris pombero Wild & Cuezzo, 2006
