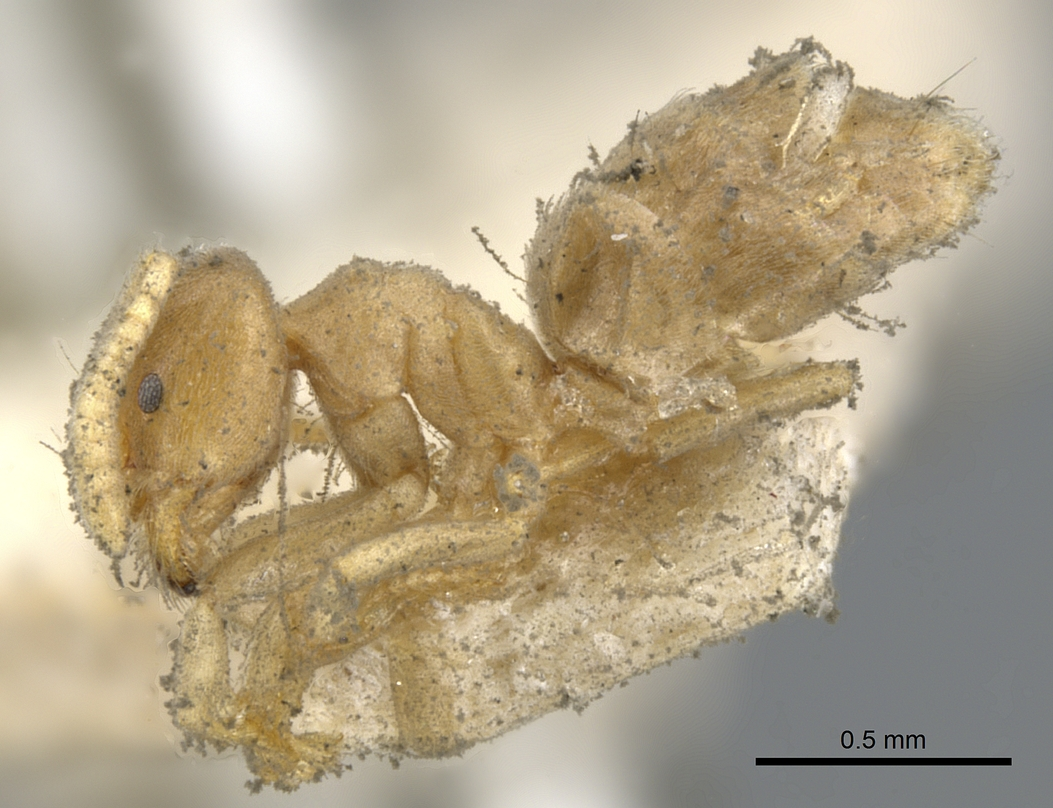
- Chronoxenus myops

Scientific classification
- Domain: Eukaryota
- Kingdom: Animalia
- Phylum: Arthropoda
- Class: Insecta
- Order: Hymenoptera
- Family: Formicidae
- Subfamily: Dolichoderinae
- Tribe: Bothriomyrmecini
- Genus: Chronoxenus; Santschi, 1919

Type species
- Bothriomyrmex myops Forel, 1895

Diversity
- 6 species

= Chronoxenus =

Genus of ants

Chronoxenus is a genus of ants in the subfamily Dolichoderinae. The genus is known from Asia.

== Species ==
- Chronoxenus butteli (Forel, 1913)
- Chronoxenus dalyi (Forel, 1895)
- Chronoxenus myops (Forel, 1895)
- Chronoxenus rossi (Donisthorpe, 1950)
- Chronoxenus walshi (Forel, 1895)
- Chronoxenus wroughtonii (Forel, 1895)
