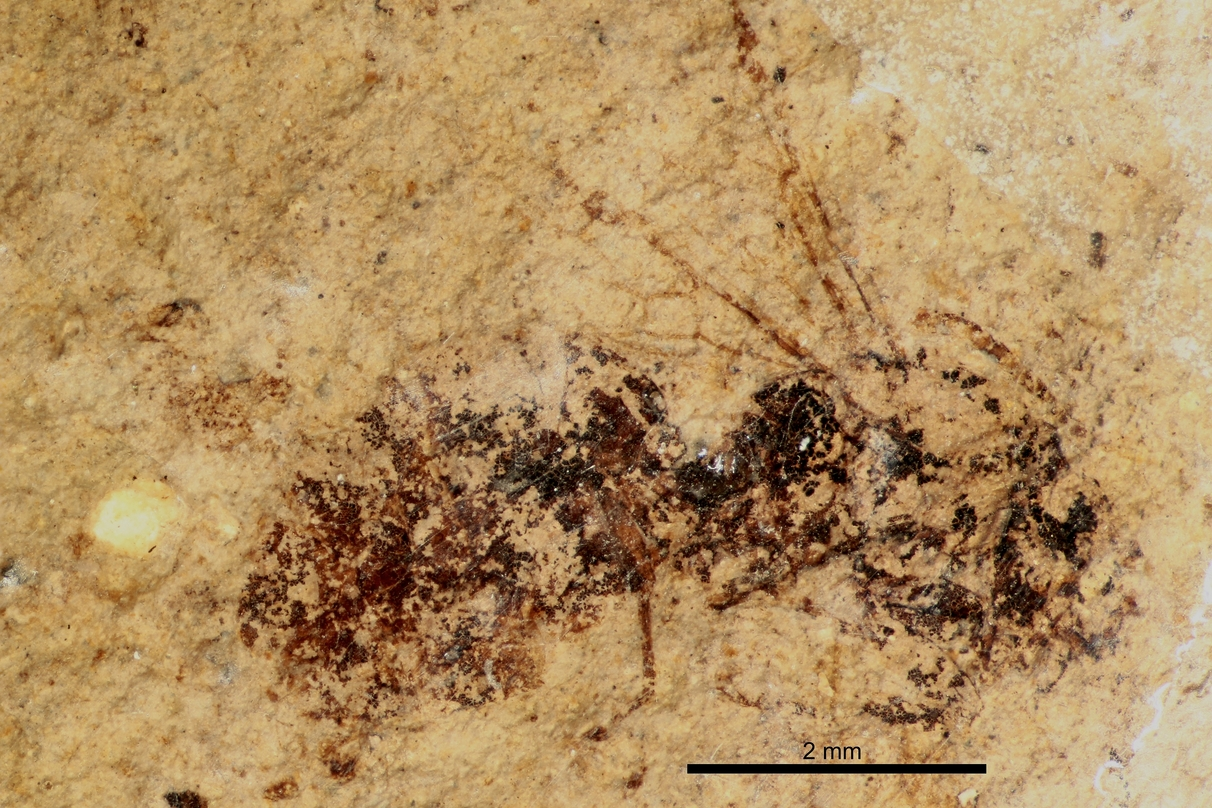
- Paratype queen

Scientific classification
- Domain: Eukaryota
- Kingdom: Animalia
- Phylum: Arthropoda
- Class: Insecta
- Order: Hymenoptera
- Family: Formicidae
- Subfamily: Dolichoderinae
- Genus: Dolichoderus
- Species: †D. antiquus

Binomial name
- †Dolichoderus antiquus Carpenter, 1930

= Dolichoderus antiquus =

Dolichoderus antiquus Temporal range: Late Eocene

Species of ant

Dolichoderus antiquus is an extinct species of ant in the genus Dolichoderus. Described by Carpenter in 1930, the fossils of this species are only exclusive to the Florissant Formation.
