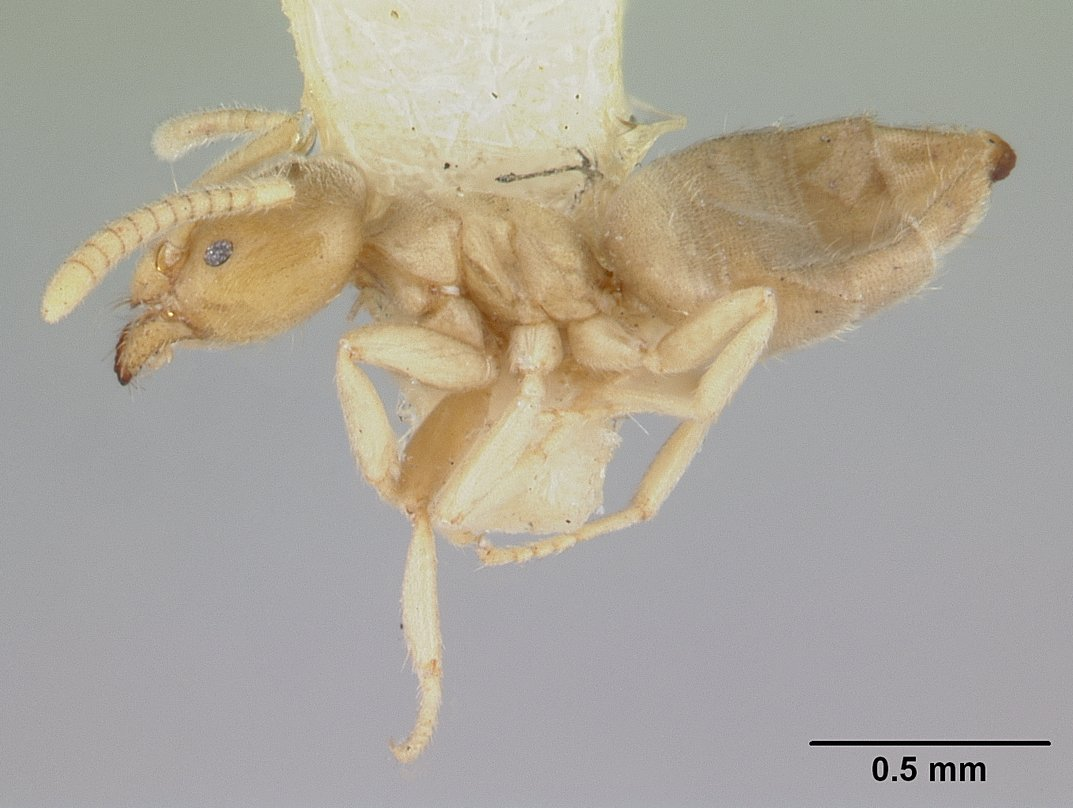
- A. flavus worker

Scientific classification
- Domain: Eukaryota
- Kingdom: Animalia
- Phylum: Arthropoda
- Class: Insecta
- Order: Hymenoptera
- Superfamily: Formicoidea
- Family: Formicidae
- Subfamily: Dolichoderinae
- Tribe: Bothriomyrmecini; Dubovikov, 2005

Genera
- See text

Diversity
- c. 5 genera

= Bothriomyrmecini =

Tribe of ants

Bothriomyrmecini is a tribe of Dolichoderinae ants with 5 genera.

== Genera ==
- Arnoldius, Dubovikov, 2005
- Bothriomyrmex, Emery, 1869
- Chronoxenus, Santschi, 1919
- Loweriella, Shattuck, 1992
- Ravavy, Fisher, 2009
