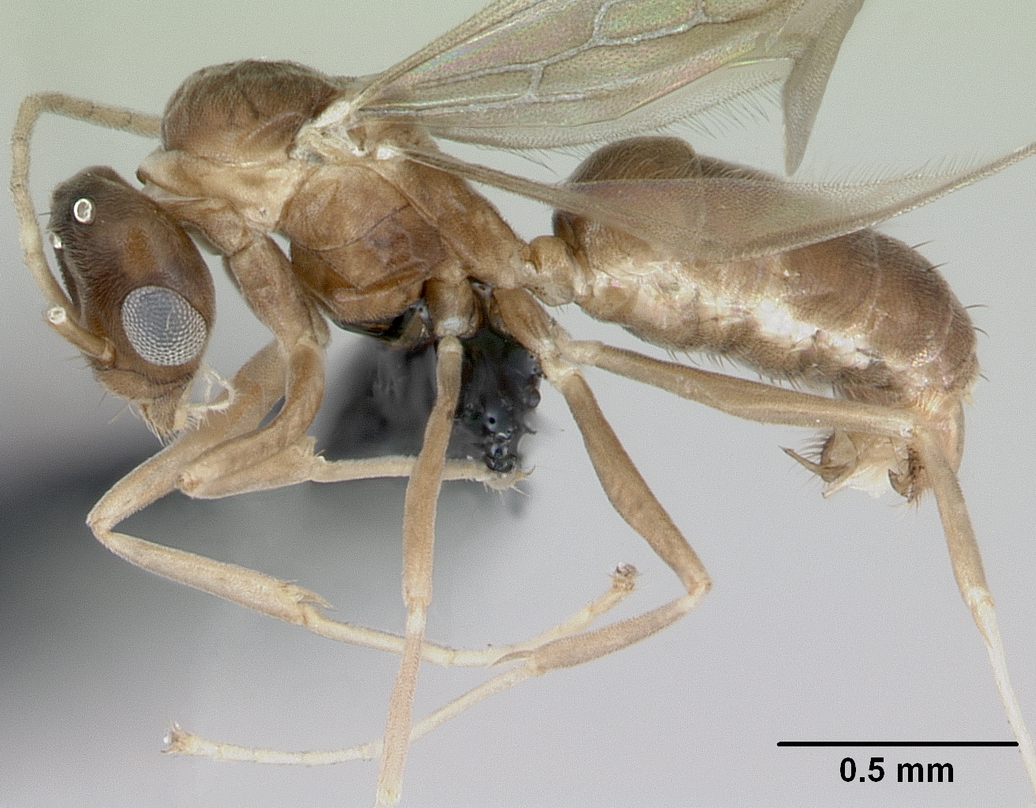
- Ravavy miafina male from Madagascar

Scientific classification
- Kingdom: Animalia
- Phylum: Arthropoda
- Class: Insecta
- Order: Hymenoptera
- Family: Formicidae
- Clade: Dolichoderomorpha
- Subfamily: Dolichoderinae
- Tribe: Bothriomyrmecini
- Genus: Ravavy; Fisher, 2009

Type species
- Ravavy miafina Fisher, 2009

Diversity
- 3 species

= Ravavy =

Genus of ants

Ravavy is a genus of dolichoderine ants containing three species.

== Description ==
The males are distinguished from all other described males in the dolichoderine genera by its unique mandibular shape. The elongate basal margin and reduced masticatory margin is considered apomorphic for the genus. The shape of the clypeus, length of scape and form of petiole, together form an inclusive diagnosis that isolates Ravavy from all other genera in the subfamily. No other described male is even superficially similar to Ravavy. The shape of the mandible in Bothriomyrmex, however, is reminiscent in some respects. The mandible in Bothriomyrmex is not triangular as in Tapinoma for example, but like Ravavy, has a short masticatory margin compared to the basal margin. In Bothriomyrmex, however, the masticatory margin includes at least three teeth, while in Ravavy a single tooth is present.

== Species ==
As of 2026, the genus contains three species, including two extant and one extinct.

=== Extant ===
- Ravavy indicus (Forel, 1895)
- Ravavy miafina Fisher, 2009

=== Extinct ===
- †Ravavy goldmani Boudinot & Perrichot, 2022
