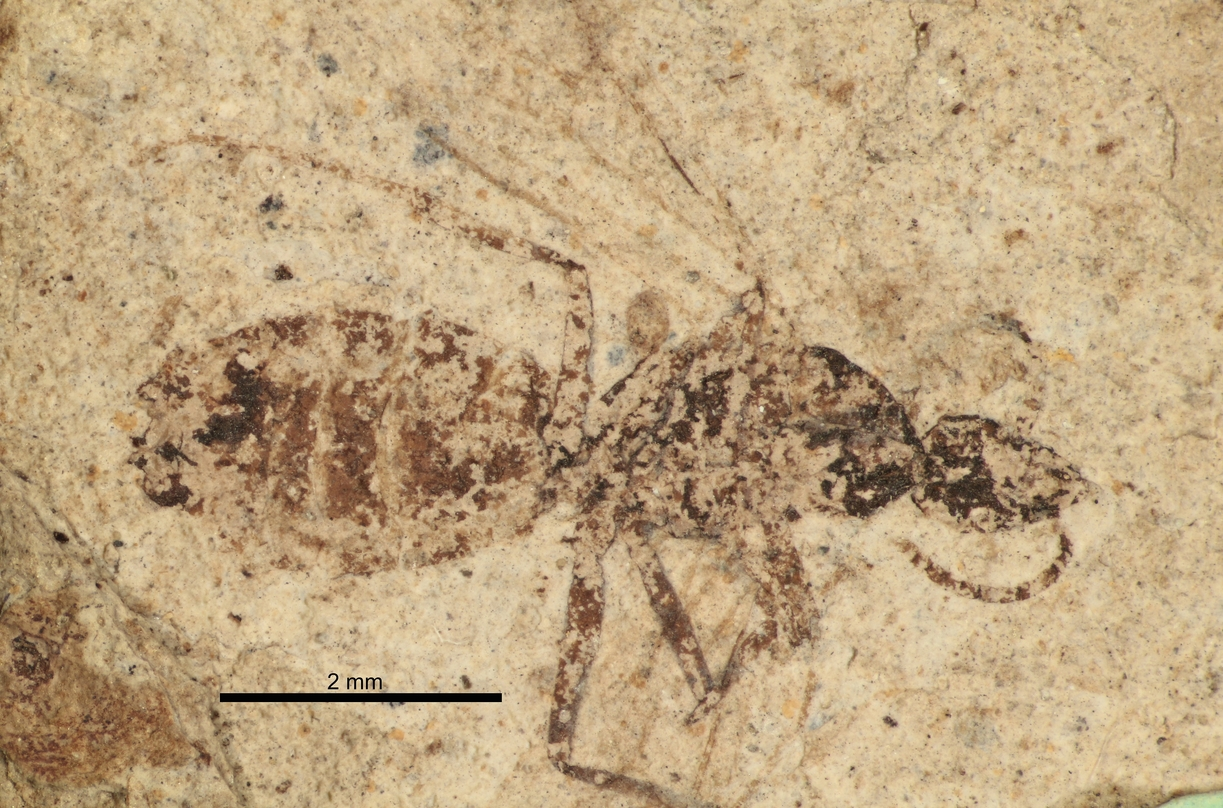

Scientific classification
- Domain: Eukaryota
- Kingdom: Animalia
- Phylum: Arthropoda
- Class: Insecta
- Order: Hymenoptera
- Family: Formicidae
- Subfamily: Dolichoderinae
- Tribe: incertae sedis
- Genus: †Protazteca; Carpenter, 1930

Type species
- Protazteca elongata

Diversity
- 5 fossil species

= Protazteca =

Protazteca Temporal range: Oligocene

Genus of ants

Protazteca is an extinct genus of ants in the subfamily Dolichoderinae, that were endemic to the United States, which was described by Carpenter in 1930.

== Species ==
There are currently 5 fossil species.

- Protazteca capitata Carpenter, 1930
- Protazteca eocenica Lapolla & Greenwalt, 2015
- Protazteca elongata Carpenter, 1930
- Protazteca hendersoni (Cockerell, 1906)
- Protazteca quadrata Carpenter, 1930
