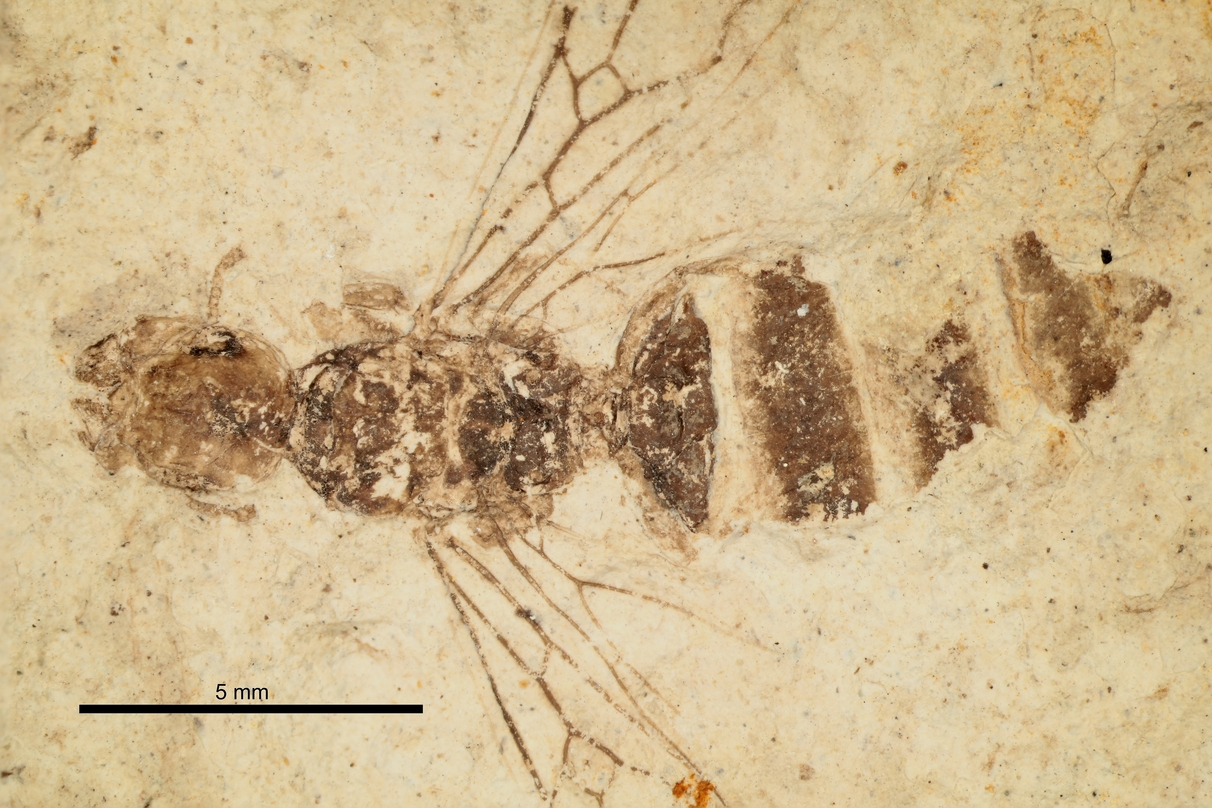
- Miomyrmex impactus

Scientific classification
- Domain: Eukaryota
- Kingdom: Animalia
- Phylum: Arthropoda
- Class: Insecta
- Order: Hymenoptera
- Family: Formicidae
- Subfamily: Dolichoderinae
- Tribe: †Miomyrmecini; Carpenter, 1930
- Genus: †Miomyrmex; Carpenter, 1930

Type species
- Formica impacta, now Miomyrmex impactus

Diversity
- 2 fossil species

= Miomyrmex =

Miomyrmex Temporal range: Oligocene?

Genus of ants

Miomyrmex is an extinct genus of ant of the subfamily Dolichoderinae. The fossils were first discovered in the United States in the state of Colorado in 1930.

== Species ==
There are two species in this extinct genus.

- Miomyrmex impactus Cockerell, 1927
- Miomyrmex striatus Carpenter, 1930
