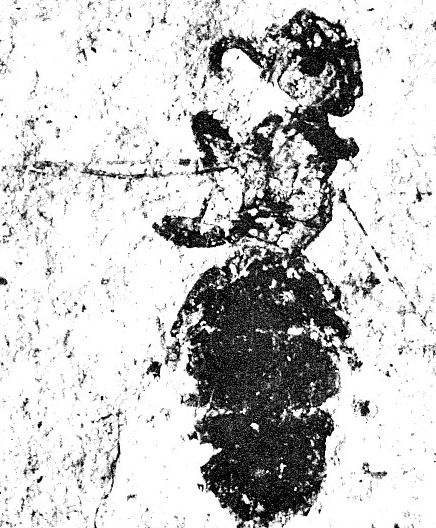
- Petraeomyrmex minimus

Scientific classification
- Domain: Eukaryota
- Kingdom: Animalia
- Phylum: Arthropoda
- Class: Insecta
- Order: Hymenoptera
- Family: Formicidae
- Subfamily: Dolichoderinae
- Tribe: incertae sedis
- Genus: †Petraeomyrmex; Carpenter, 1930
- Species: †P. minimus

Binomial name
- †Petraeomyrmex minimus Carpenter, 1930

= Petraeomyrmex =

Petraeomyrmex Temporal range: Oligocene

Genus of ants

Petraeomyrmex is a genus of extinct species in the subfamily Dolichoderinae. The genus only contains a single species Petraeomyrmex minimus. The species was once endemic to the United States in Colorado, which was the location of where the fossil remains were found.
