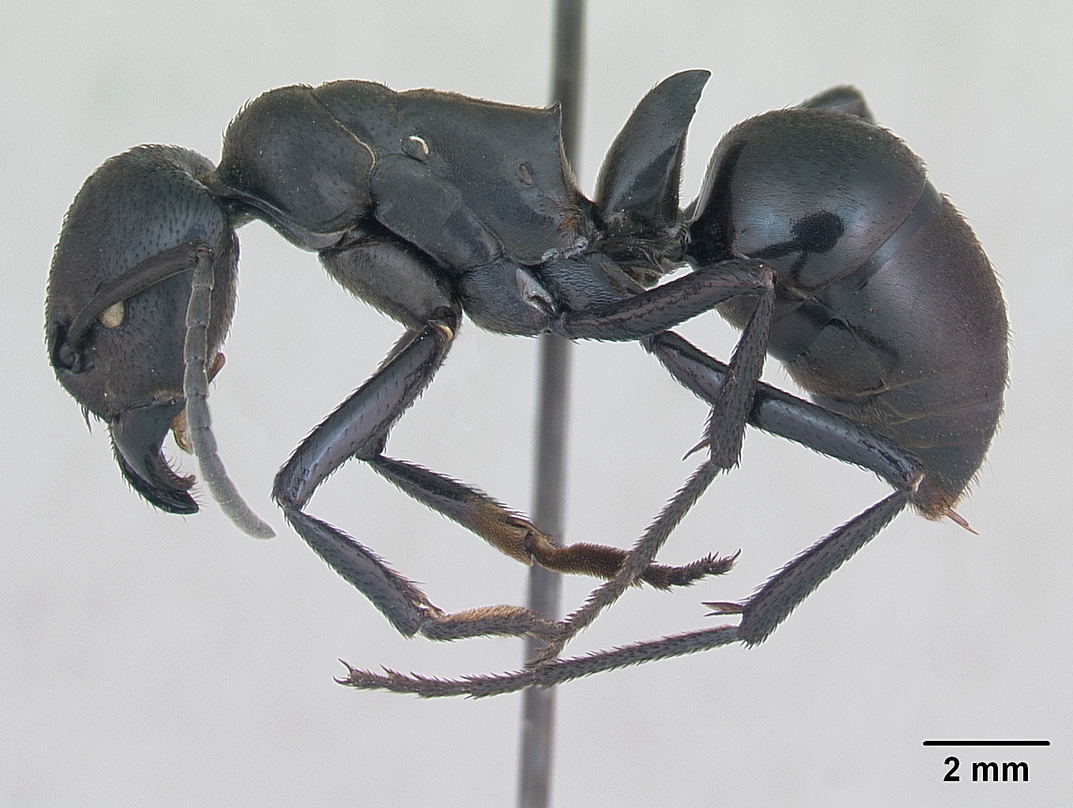
- Streblognathus peetersi worker from South Africa

Scientific classification
- Kingdom: Animalia
- Phylum: Arthropoda
- Class: Insecta
- Order: Hymenoptera
- Family: Formicidae
- Subfamily: Ponerinae
- Tribe: Ponerini
- Genus: Streblognathus; Mayr, 1862

Type species
- Ponera aethiopica F. Smith, 1858

Diversity
- 2 species

= Streblognathus =

Genus of ants

Streblognathus is a genus of ants in the subfamily Ponerinae. The genus contains two species found in southern Africa.

== Species ==
- Streblognathus aethiopicus (Smith, 1858)
- Streblognathus peetersi Robertson, 2002

== Biology ==
Both species of Streblognathus lack morphological queens. They belong to the minority of Ponerinae in which all workers are able to mate and store sperm. Young nestmate workers interact aggressively to establish a dominance hierarchy that regulates which individual becomes the single gamergate (mated egglaying worker).
