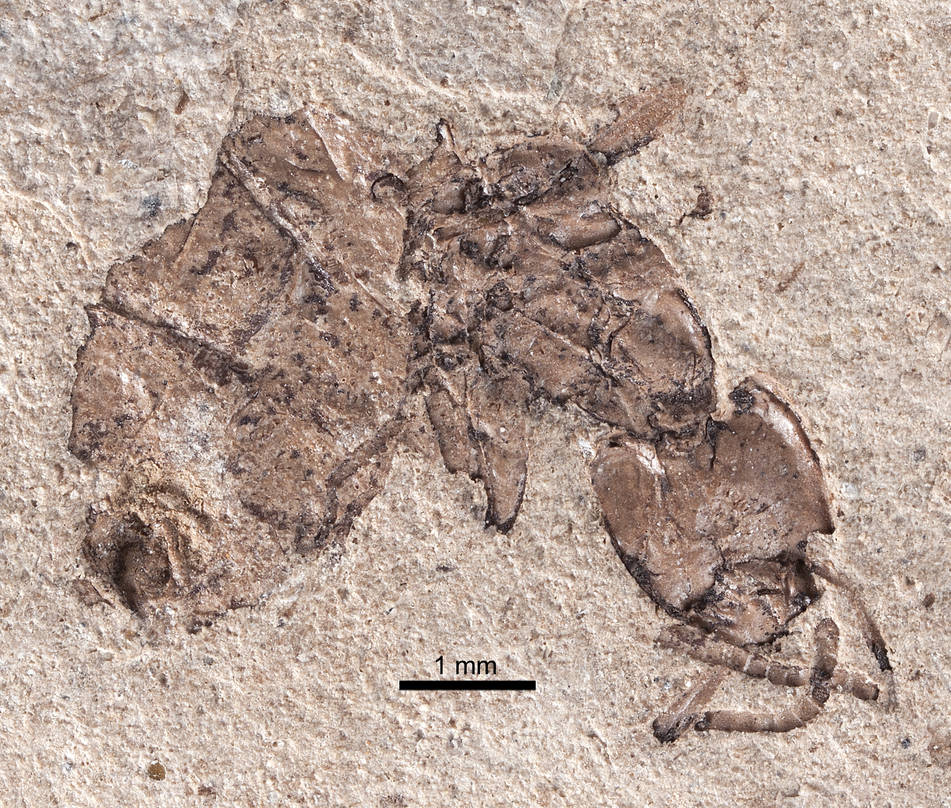
- Elaeomyrmex gracilis paratype worker

Scientific classification
- Domain: Eukaryota
- Kingdom: Animalia
- Phylum: Arthropoda
- Class: Insecta
- Order: Hymenoptera
- Family: Formicidae
- Subfamily: Dolichoderinae
- Tribe: incertae sedis
- Genus: †Elaeomyrmex; Carpenter, 1930

Type species
- Elaeomyrmex gracilis

Species
- E. coloradensis; E. gracilis

= Elaeomyrmex =

Elaeomyrmex Temporal range: Oligocene

Genus of ants

Elaeomyrmex is an extinct genus of ant in the subfamily Dolichoderinae and containing two species. The fossils were first described from the Florissant Formation, Colorado in 1930.

Only the workers and queens have been properly studied, and it shows the workers were similar in appearance to the queens, except the queens were the largest of the colony.

== Species ==
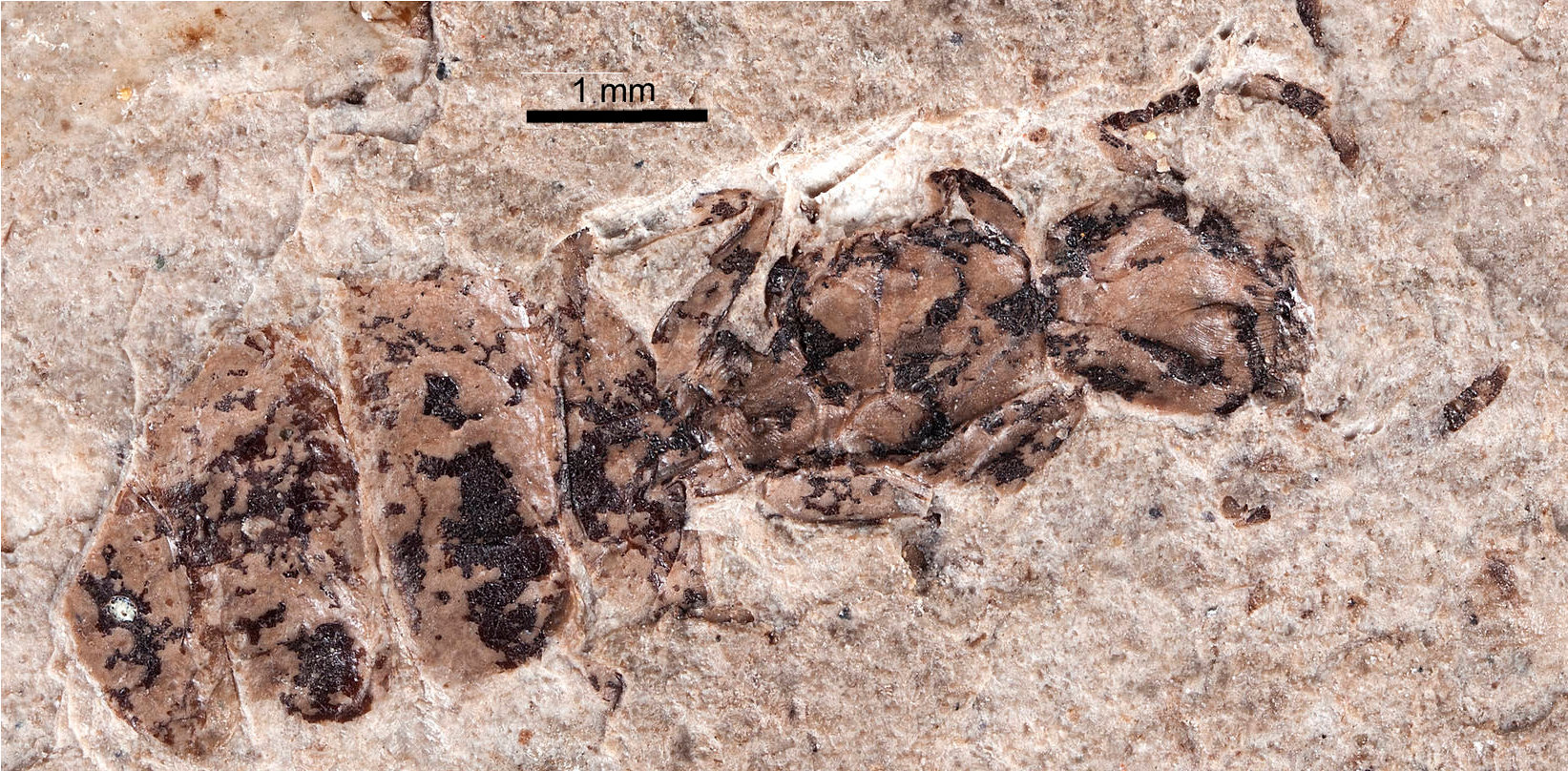
E. coloradensis paratype queen

- Elaeomyrmex coloradensis Carpenter, 1930
- Elaeomyrmex gracilis Carpenter, 1930
