= Frank M. Carpenter =

American paleontologist

- Born: September 6, 1902; Boston, Massachusetts, U.S.
- Died: January 18, 1994 (aged 91); Lexington, Massachusetts, U.S.
- Education: Harvard University
- Awards: Paleontological Society Medal (1975)
- Scientific career
- Fields: Entomology, paleontology
- Thesis: The fossil ants of North America (1929)
- Doctoral advisor: William Morton Wheeler
- Doctoral students: E. O. Wilson

Frank Morton Carpenter (September 6, 1902 – January 18, 1994) was an American entomologist and paleontologist. He received his PhD from Harvard University, and was curator of fossil insects at the Harvard Museum of Comparative Zoology for 60 years. He studied the Permian fossil insects of Elmo, Kansas, and compared the North American fossil insect fauna with Paleozoic taxa known from elsewhere in the world. A careful and methodical worker, he used venation and mouthparts to determine the relationships of fossil taxa, and was author of the Treatise volume on Insects. He reduced the number of extinct insect orders then described from about fifty to nine.

Entomologists David Grimaldi and Michael S. Engel consider him "the most influential paleoentomologist of his generation" (Grimaldi and Engel 2005 p. 143). He has been memorialized frequently with patronyms, including the hanging fly Bittacus carpenteri Cheng, 1957, the fossil parasitic wasp Carpenteriana tumida Yoshimoto, 1975, the fossil snakefly Fibla carpenteri Engel, 1995, the fossil ant Protrechina carpenteri Wilson, 1985, and the caddisfly Rhyacophila carpenteri Milne, 1936. He also taught at the Harvard Extension School.

Carpenter was elected in 1938 a fellow of the Entomological Society of America.

== See also ==
- Category:Taxa named by Frank M. Carpenter
