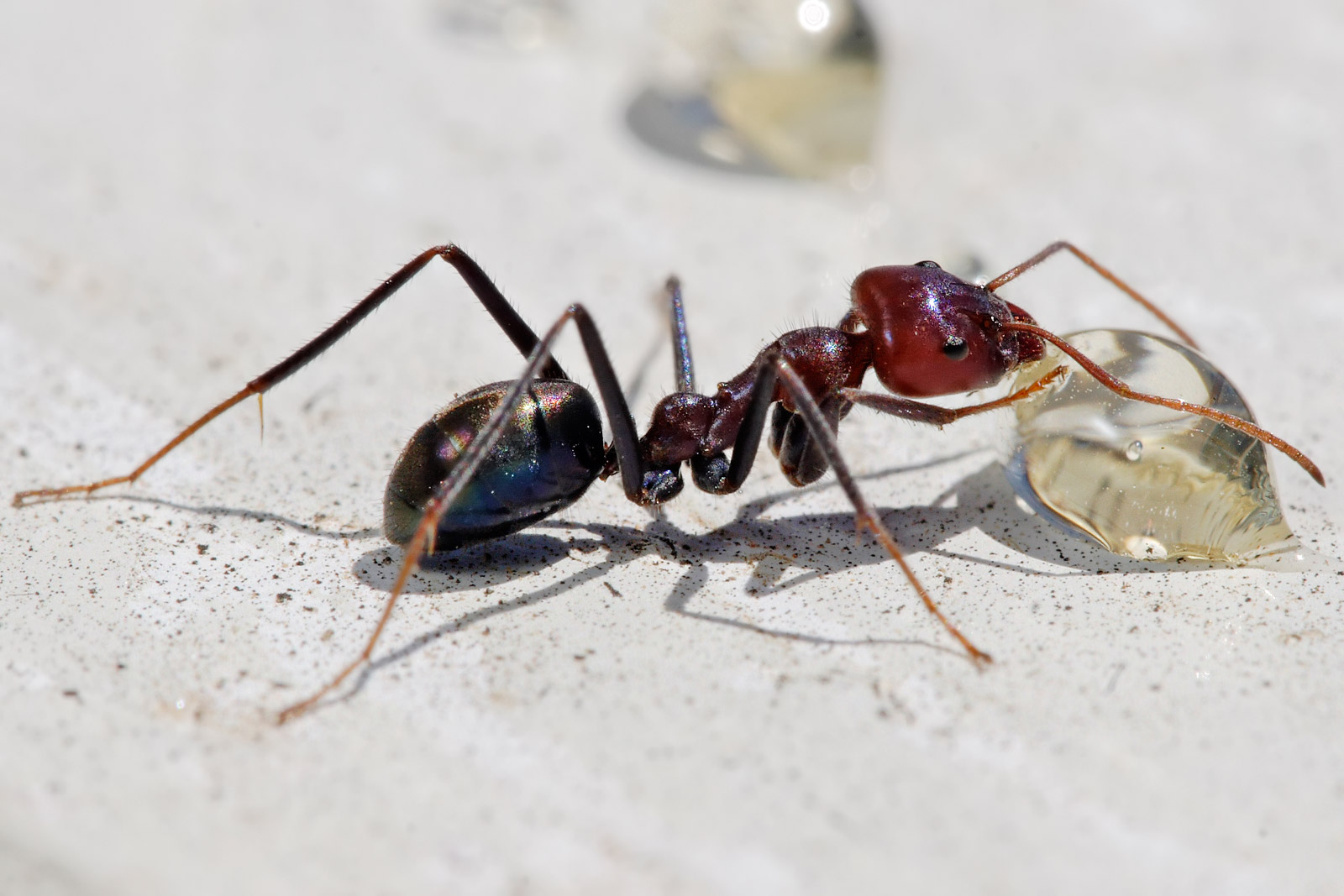
- Iridomyrmex purpureus feeding on honey

Scientific classification
- Kingdom: Animalia
- Phylum: Arthropoda
- Clade: Pancrustacea
- Class: Insecta
- Order: Hymenoptera
- Family: Formicidae
- Clade: Dolichoderomorpha
- Subfamily: Dolichoderinae; Forel, 1878

Type genus
- Dolichoderus Lund, 1831

= Dolichoderinae =

Subfamily of ants

Dolichoderinae is a subfamily of ants that includes species such as the Argentine ant (Linepithema humile), the erratic ant, the odorous house ant, and the cone ant. The subfamily presents a great diversity of species throughout the world, distributed in different biogeographic realms, from the Palearctic, Nearctic, Afrotropical region and Malaysia, to the Middle East, Australian, and Neotropical regions.

The subfamily is distinguished by having a single petiole (no post-petiole) and a slit-like orifice, from which chemical compounds are released. Dolichoderine ants do not possess a sting, unlike ants in some other subfamilies, such as Ponerinae and Myrmicinae, instead relying on the chemical defensive compounds produced from the anal gland.

Of the compounds produced by dolichoderine ants, several terpenoids were identified including the previously unknown iridomyrmecin, isoiridomyrmecin, and iridodial. Such compounds are responsible for the smell given off by ants of this subfamily when crushed or disturbed.

== Tribes and genera ==
Dolichoderini consists of at least five tribes and 48 genera:

- Bothriomyrmecini Dubovikov, 2005
  - Arnoldius Dubovikov, 2005
  - Bothriomyrmex Emery, 1869
  - Chronoxenus Santschi, 1919
  - Loweriella Shattuck, 1992
  - Ravavy Fisher, 2009
- Dolichoderini Forel, 1878
  - Dolichoderus Lund, 1831
- Leptomyrmecini Emery, 1913
  - Anillidris Santschi, 1936
  - Anonychomyrma Donisthorpe, 1947
  - Azteca Forel, 1878
  - †Chronomyrmex McKellar, Glasier & Engel, 2013
  - Doleromyrma Forel, 1907
  - Dorymyrmex Mayr, 1866
  - Forelius Emery, 1888
  - Froggattella Forel, 1902
  - Gracilidris Wild & Cuezzo, 2006
  - Iridomyrmex Mayr, 1862
  - Leptomyrmex Mayr, 1862
  - †Leptomyrmula Emery, 1913
  - Linepithema Mayr, 1866
  - Nebothriomyrmex Dubovikov, 2004
  - Ochetellus Shattuck, 1992
  - Papyrius Shattuck, 1992
  - Philidris Shattuck, 1992
  - Turneria Forel, 1895
  - †Yantaromyrmex Dlussky & Dubovikoff, 2013
- †Miomyrmecini Carpenter, 1930
  - †Miomyrmex Carpenter, 1930
- Tapinomini Emery, 1913
  - Aptinoma Fisher, 2009
  - Axinidris Weber, 1941
  - †Ctenobethylus Brues, 1939
  - Ecphorella Forel, 1909
  - Liometopum Mayr, 1861
  - Tapinoma Förster, 1850
  - Technomyrmex Mayr, 1872
- †Zherichiniini Dlussky, 1988
  - †Zherichinius Dlussky, 1988
- incertae sedis
  - †Alloiomma Zhang, 1989
  - †Elaeomyrmex Carpenter, 1930
  - †Elaphrodites Zhang, 1989
  - †Emplastus Donisthorpe, 1920
  - †Eotapinoma Dlussky, 1988
  - †Eurymyrmex Zhang, Sun & Zhang, 1994
  - †Kotshkorkia Dlussky, 1981
  - †Ktunaxia Lapolla & Greenwalt, 2015
  - †Petraeomyrmex Carpenter, 1930
  - †Proiridomyrmex Dlussky & Rasnitsyn, 2003
  - †Protazteca Carpenter, 1930
  - †Usomyrma Dlussky, Radchenko & Dubovikoff, 2014

== See also ==
- List of ants of Andorra
