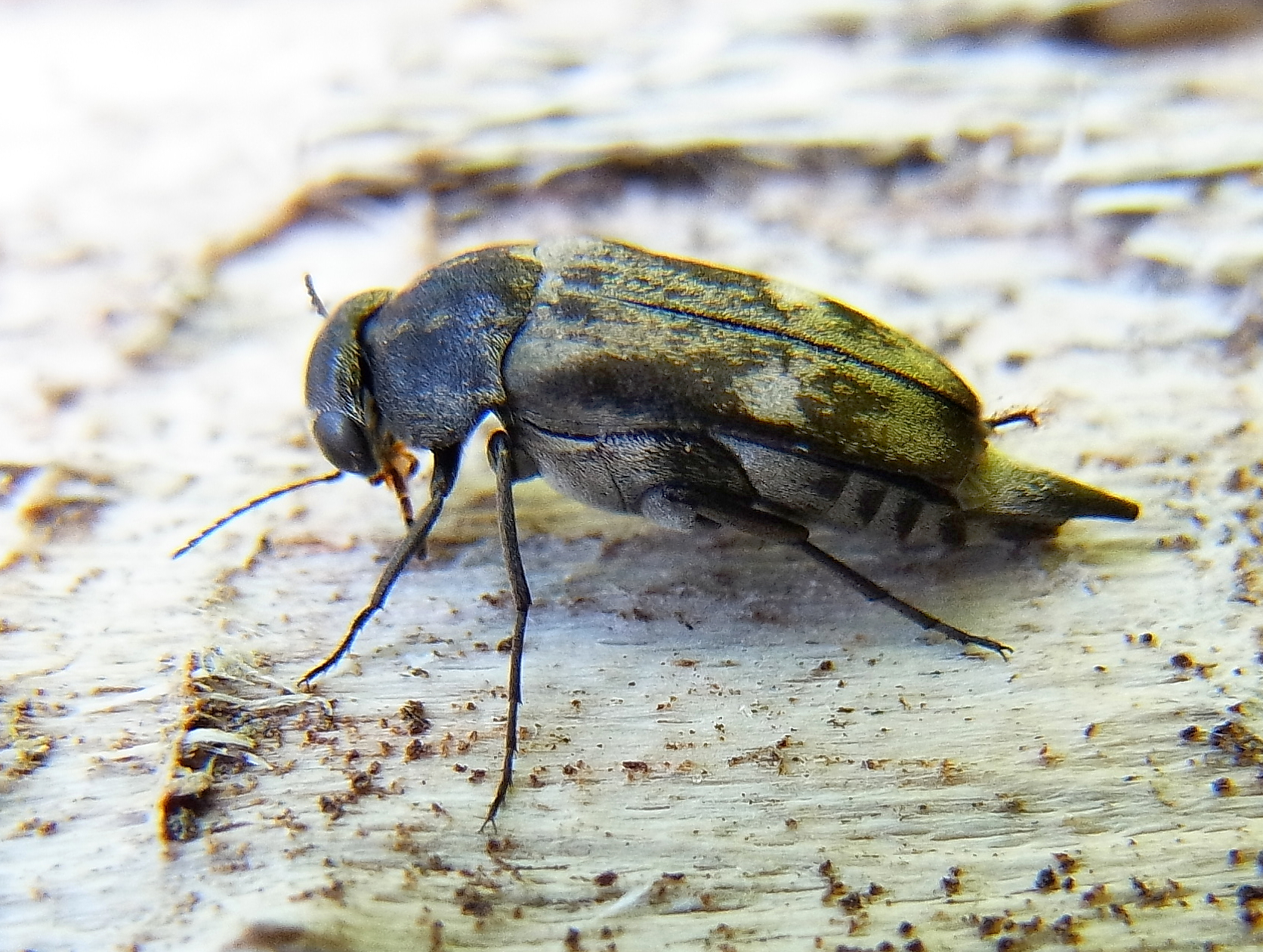
- Tomoxia bucephala

Scientific classification
- Domain: Eukaryota
- Kingdom: Animalia
- Phylum: Arthropoda
- Class: Insecta
- Order: Coleoptera
- Suborder: Polyphaga
- Infraorder: Cucujiformia
- Family: Mordellidae
- Subfamily: Mordellinae
- Tribe: Mordellini
- Genus: Tomoxia; Costa, 1854

= Tomoxia =

Genus of beetles

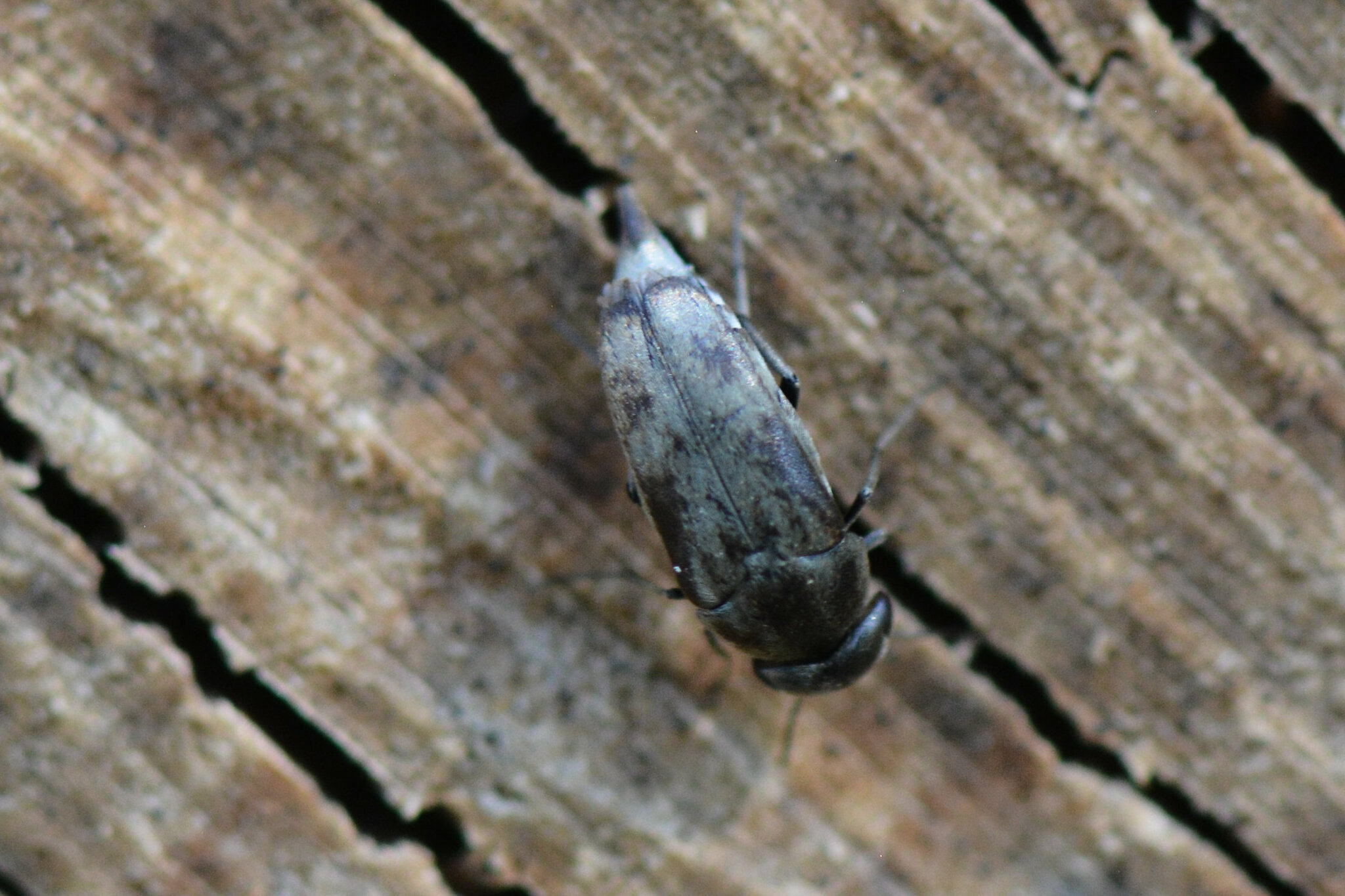
Tomoxia bucephala, Switzerland

Tomoxia is a genus of tumbling flower beetles in the family Mordellidae. There are at least 15 described species in Tomoxia.

== Species ==
These eight species belong to the genus Tomoxia:

- Tomoxia bucephala Costa, 1854 (Europe)
- Tomoxia contracta Champion, 1891
- Tomoxia exoleta Lea, 1917 (Australia)
- Tomoxia flavicans Waterhouse, 1878 (Australia)
- Tomoxia formosana Chujo, 1935 (temperate Asia)
- Tomoxia howensis Lea, 1917 (Australia)
- Tomoxia inclusa LeConte, 1862 (North America)
- Tomoxia inundata Wickham, 1914
- Tomoxia laticeps (Lea, 1895) (Australia)
- Tomoxia lineella LeConte, 1862 (North America)
- Tomoxia maculicollis Lea, 1902 (Australia)
- Tomoxia melanura Lea, 1917 (Australia)
- Tomoxia sexlineata (Lea, 1895) (Australia)
- Tomoxia spinifer Champion, 1891
- † Tomoxia succinea Bao
