= Pentaria dispar =

Scientific classification
- Domain: Eukaryota
- Kingdom: Animalia
- Phylum: Arthropoda
- Class: Insecta
- Order: Coleoptera
- Suborder: Polyphaga
- Infraorder: Cucujiformia
- Family: Scraptiidae
- Genus: Pentaria
- Species: P. dispar

Binomial name
- Pentaria dispar (Liljeblad, 1918)

Species of beetle

Pentaria dispar is a species of false flower beetle in the family Scraptiidae. It is found in North America.
