= Canifa plagiata =

Scientific classification
- Domain: Eukaryota
- Kingdom: Animalia
- Phylum: Arthropoda
- Class: Insecta
- Order: Coleoptera
- Suborder: Polyphaga
- Infraorder: Cucujiformia
- Family: Scraptiidae
- Tribe: Scraptiini
- Genus: Canifa
- Species: C. plagiata

Binomial name
- Canifa plagiata (Melsheimer, 1846)

Species of beetle

Canifa plagiata is a species of false flower beetle in the family Scraptiidae. It is found in North America.
