= Pentaria =

Pentaria may refer to:

- Pentaria (beetle), a genus of beetles in the family Scraptiidae
- Pentaria (flower), an obsolete synonym of Passiflora, or passion flowers
