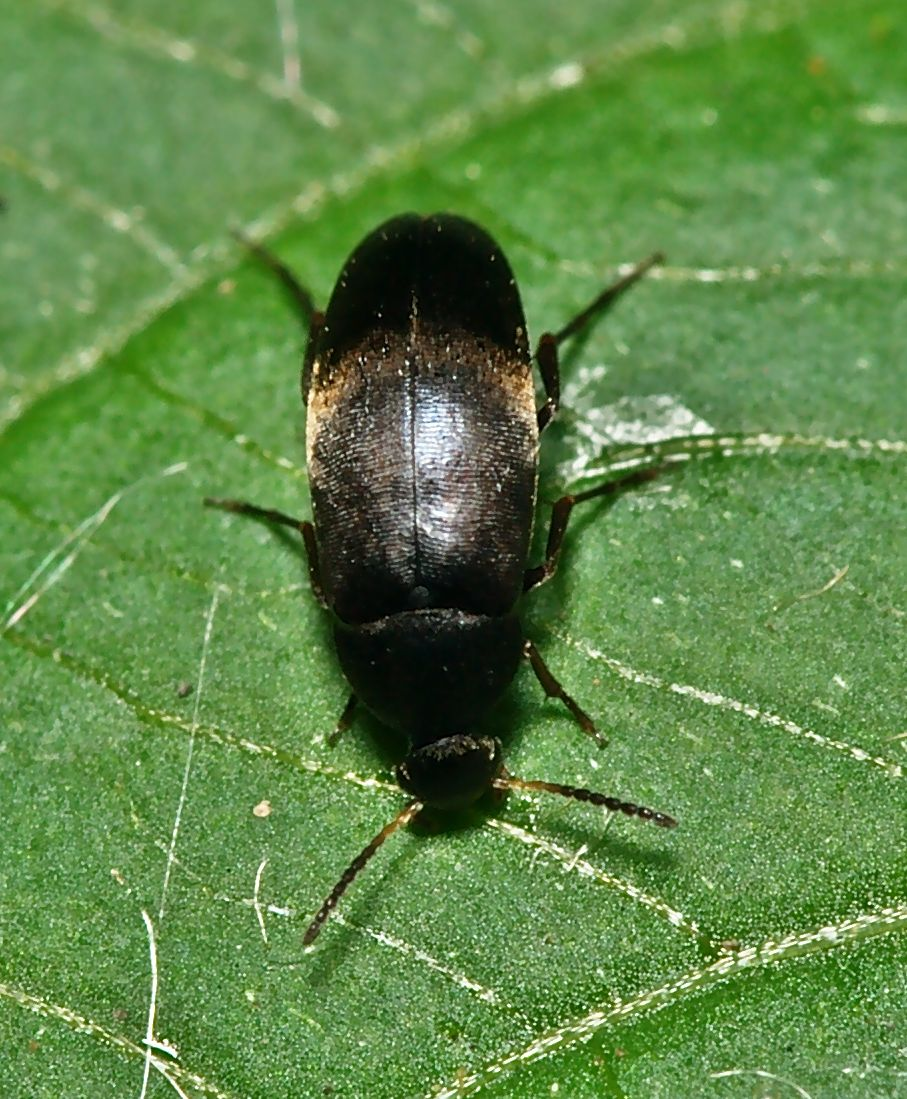
- A. rufilabris from Germany

Scientific classification
- Domain: Eukaryota
- Kingdom: Animalia
- Phylum: Arthropoda
- Class: Insecta
- Order: Coleoptera
- Suborder: Polyphaga
- Infraorder: Cucujiformia
- Family: Scraptiidae
- Subfamily: Anaspidinae
- Tribe: Anaspidini
- Genus: Anaspis; Geoffroy, 1762

= Anaspis =

Genus of beetles

Anaspis is a large genus of beetles belonging to the family Scraptiidae. These small beetles are sometimes falsely called tumbling flower beetles (Family:Mordellidae) as they occur in large numbers on flowers and have a habit of tumbling to the ground when disturbed. They do not have a vernacular common name, but some recent authors have coined the name false flower beetles, though this is used for their taxonomic family as well.

Anaspis beetle larvae relies on decomposition of wood for energy. While adult Anaspis beetles consume pollen.

== Species ==
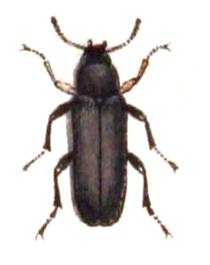
Anaspis frontalis

These 103 species belong to the genus Anaspis:

- Anaspis akaira Franciscolo, 1991
- Anaspis apfelbecki Schilsky, 1894
- Anaspis arctica Zetterstedt, 1828
- Anaspis atrata Champion, 1891
- Anaspis balthasari Roubal, 1935
- Anaspis beardsleyi Liljeblad, 1945
- Anaspis bernhaueri Roubal, 1910
- Anaspis bertrami Levey, 2020
- Anaspis bickhardti Schilsky, 1906
- Anaspis bohemica Schilsky, 1898
- Anaspis brevicornis Wollaston, 1867
- Anaspis brunnipes (Mulsant, 1856)
- Anaspis canariensis Ermisch, 1967
- Anaspis cavipalpis Apfelbeck, 1931
- Anaspis chevrolati Mulsant, 1856
- Anaspis collaris LeConte, 1851
- Anaspis cooteri Levey, 2020
- Anaspis corcyrica Schilsky, 1899
- Anaspis costai Emery, 1876
- Anaspis curtii Roubal, 1911
- Anaspis curva Levey, 2020
- Anaspis cypria Baudi e Selve, 1878
- Anaspis dichroa Emery, 1876
- Anaspis distinguenda Ermisch, 1963
- Anaspis duryi Liljeblad, 1945
- Anaspis emarginata Schilsky
- Anaspis eversi Ermisch, 1964
- Anaspis excellens Schilsky, 1908
- Anaspis fasciata (Forster, 1771)
- Anaspis flava (Linnaeus, 1758)
- Anaspis flavipennis Haldeman, 1848
- Anaspis frontalis (Linnaeus, 1758)
- Anaspis ganglbaueri Schilsky, 1899
- Anaspis garneysi Fowler, 1889
- Anaspis graeca Schilsky, 1895
- Anaspis hispanica Schilsky, 1899
- Anaspis horaki Perkovsky & Odnosum, 2009
- Anaspis horni Schilsky, 1899
- Anaspis humerosa Csiki, 1915
- Anaspis imitator Ermisch, 1963
- Anaspis incognita Schilsky, 1895
- Anaspis insularis Ermisch, 1963
- Anaspis kiesenwetteri Emery, 1876
- Anaspis kochi Ermisch, 1944
- Anaspis koenigi Schilsky B.Levey, 2008
- Anaspis kriegeri Ermisch, 1963
- Anaspis labiata Costa, 1854
- Anaspis latiuscula Mulsant, 1856
- Anaspis lindbergi Franciscolo, 1956
- Anaspis longispina Ermisch, 1941
- Anaspis lucana Franciscolo, 1943
- Anaspis lurida Stephens, 1832
- Anaspis luteobrunea Fleischer, 1909
- Anaspis maculata Geoffroy, 1785
- Anaspis mancinii Franciscolo, 1942
- Anaspis marginicollis Lindberg, 1925
- Anaspis mariae Roubal, 1910
- Anaspis marseuli Csiki, 1915
- Anaspis melanostoma Costa, 1854
- Anaspis militaris Smith, 1882
- Anaspis mulsanti Brisout de Barneville, 1859
- Anaspis nigricolor
- Anaspis nigrina Csiki, 1915
- Anaspis nigripes Brisout de Barneville, 1866
- Anaspis numeensis Fauvel, 1905
- Anaspis olympiae Hatch, 1965
- Anaspis ornata Schilsky, 1895
- Anaspis palpalis Gerhardt, 1876
- Anaspis palustris Perroud & Montrouzier, 1864
- Anaspis parallela Ermisch, 1941
- Anaspis parva Abdullah, 1964
- Anaspis poggi Franciscolo, 1982
- Anaspis proteus Wollaston, 1854
- Anaspis pulicaria Costa, 1854
- Anaspis pyranaea Fairmaire & Brisout, 1859
- Anaspis pyrenaea Fairmaire & Brisout de Barneville, 1859
- Anaspis quadrimaculata Gyllenhal, 1817
- Anaspis rambouseki Roubal, 1910
- Anaspis rayi Hatch, 1962
- Anaspis regimbarti Schilsky, 1895
- Anaspis revelieri Emery, 1876
- Anaspis rufa Say, 1826
- Anaspis ruficollis (Fabricius, 1792)
- Anaspis rufilabris (Gyllenhal, 1827)
- Anaspis rufitarsis Lucas, 1854
- Anaspis schneideri Emery, 1876
- Anaspis seposita Liljeblad, 1945
- Anaspis serbica Apfelbeck, 1931
- Anaspis sericea (Mannerheim, 1843)
- Anaspis setulosa Schilsky, 1895
- Anaspis silvatica Gabriel, 1916
- Anaspis steppensis Motschulsky, 1860
- Anaspis stierlini Emery, 1876
- Anaspis stussineri Fleischer, 1909
- Anaspis subtilis Hampe, 1870
- Anaspis suturalis Emery, 1876
- Anaspis thoracica (Linnaeus, 1758)
- Anaspis thoracoxantha Franciscolo, 1943
- Anaspis trifasciata Chevrolat, 1860
- Anaspis truquii Baudi e Selve, 1878
- Anaspis varians (Mulsant, 1856)
- Anaspis versicolor Baudi e Selve, 1878
- Anaspis viennensis Schilsky, 1895
