= Petrimordella smithiana =

Petrimordella smithiana Temporal range: Chadronian

Scientific classification
- Domain: Eukaryota
- Kingdom: Animalia
- Phylum: Arthropoda
- Class: Insecta
- Order: Coleoptera
- Suborder: Polyphaga
- Infraorder: Cucujiformia
- Family: Mordellidae
- Informal group: †Petrimordella
- Species: †P. smithiana

Binomial name
- †Petrimordella smithiana (Wickham, 1913)

Synonyms
- Mordellistena smithiana Wickham, 1913

Species of beetle

Petrimordella smithiana is a fossil species of tumbling flower beetles in the family Mordellidae. It was found in the Florissant Formation of Colorado.
