= Tomoxia spinifer =

Scientific classification
- Domain: Eukaryota
- Kingdom: Animalia
- Phylum: Arthropoda
- Class: Insecta
- Order: Coleoptera
- Suborder: Polyphaga
- Infraorder: Cucujiformia
- Family: Mordellidae
- Genus: Tomoxia
- Species: T. spinifer

Binomial name
- Tomoxia spinifer Champion, 1891

Species of beetle

Tomoxia spinifer is a species of beetle in the genus Tomoxia of the family Mordellidae. It was described by George Charles Champion in 1891.
