= Anaspis brevicornis =

Scientific classification
- Domain: Eukaryota
- Kingdom: Animalia
- Phylum: Arthropoda
- Class: Insecta
- Order: Coleoptera
- Suborder: Polyphaga
- Infraorder: Cucujiformia
- Family: Scraptiidae
- Genus: Anaspis
- Species: A. brevicornis

Binomial name
- Anaspis brevicornis Wollaston, 1867

Species of beetle

Anaspis brevicornis is a species of beetles of the family Scraptiidae. It is endemic to Cape Verde, where it occurs on the islands of Santo Antão and Fogo. The species was described by Thomas Vernon Wollaston in 1867.
