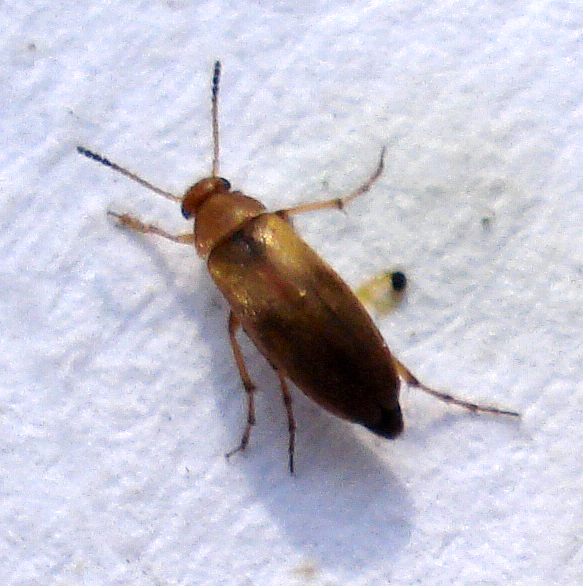
- Anaspis maculata

Scientific classification
- Kingdom: Animalia
- Phylum: Arthropoda
- Class: Insecta
- Order: Coleoptera
- Suborder: Polyphaga
- Infraorder: Cucujiformia
- Family: Scraptiidae
- Subfamily: Anaspidinae
- Tribe: Anaspidini
- Genus: Anaspis
- Species: A. maculata

Binomial name
- Anaspis maculata Geoffroy, 1785

Synonyms
- Anaspis bipunctata Ragusa, 1898; Anaspis exoleta Costa, 1854; Anaspis florenceae Donisthorpe, 1928; Anaspis innolata Schilsky, 1892; Anaspis melanopa (Forster, 1771); Anaspis nigricollis (Marsham, 1802); Anaspis obscura (Marsham, 1802); Anaspis pallida (Marsham, 1802); Anaspis quadrimaculata Costa, 1854; Anaspis vulcanica Costa, 1854; Mordella bipunctata Bonelli, 1812; Mordella maculata (Geoffroy, 1785); Mordella melanopa Forster, 1771; Mordella obscura Marsham, 1802; Mordella pallida Marsham, 1802; Silaria picta Hampe, 1870

= Anaspis maculata =

Species of beetles

Anaspis maculata is a species of false flower beetle in the family Scraptiidae. It is found mainly in Europe.
