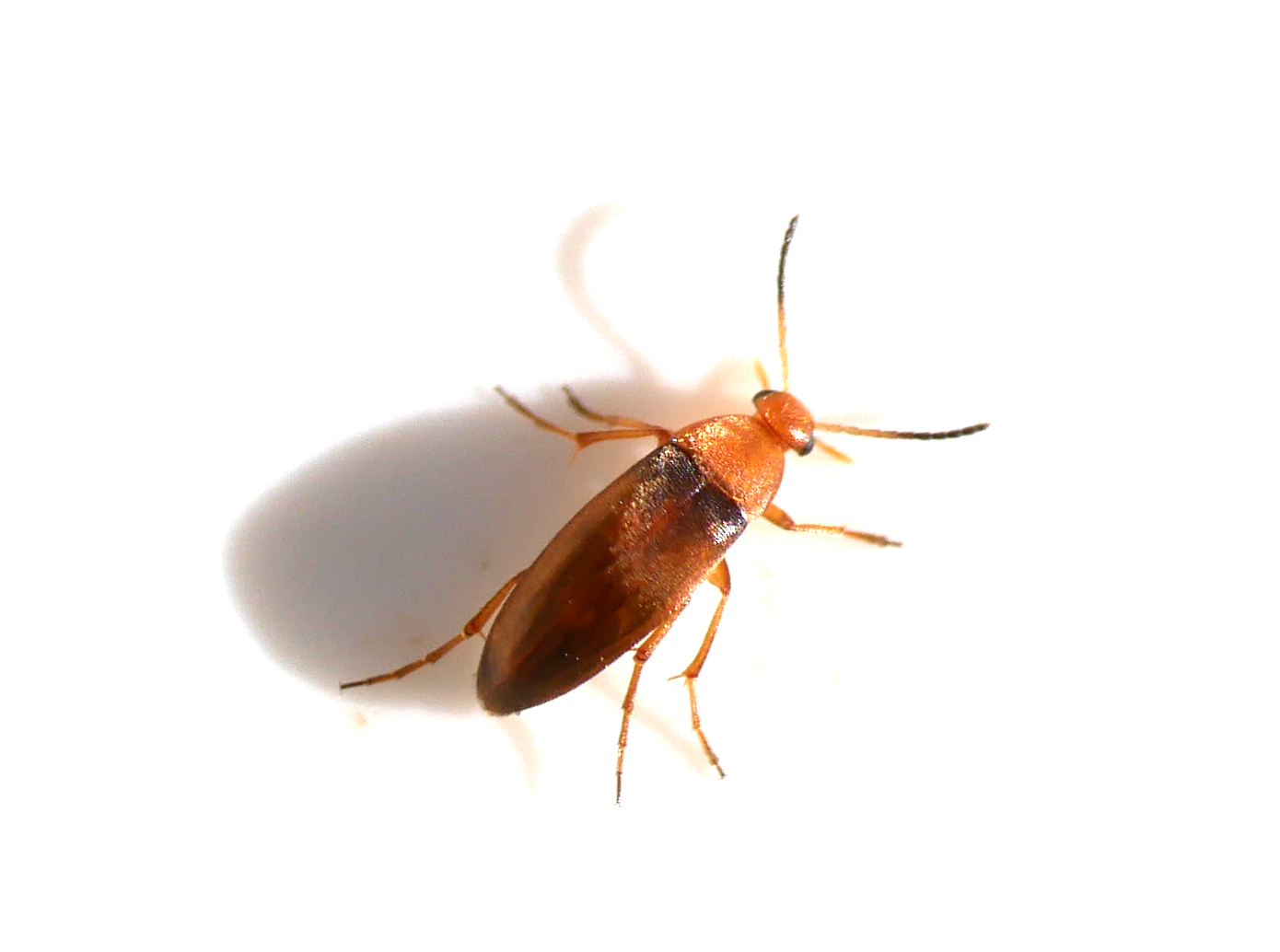
- Anaspis thoracica, Denmark

Scientific classification
- Kingdom: Animalia
- Phylum: Arthropoda
- Class: Insecta
- Order: Coleoptera
- Suborder: Polyphaga
- Infraorder: Cucujiformia
- Family: Scraptiidae
- Subfamily: Anaspidinae
- Tribe: Anaspidini
- Genus: Anaspis
- Species: A. thoracica

Binomial name
- Anaspis thoracica (Linnaeus, 1758)

Synonyms
- Anaspis confusa Emery, 1876; Anaspis helvetica Pic, 1918; Anaspis latipalpis Schilsky, 1895; Anaspis schilskyana Hellén, 1935; Anaspis septentrionalis Champion, 1891; Mordella thoracica Linnaeus, 1758

= Anaspis thoracica =

Species of beetles

Anaspis thoracica is a species of false flower beetle in the family Scraptiidae, found in the Palearctic.
