= Ctenidium =

Ctenidium (plural: ctenidia) may refer to:

- Ctenidium (mollusc) (plural: ctenidia), a comb-like gill, part of the respiratory system of molluscs
- Ctenidium (plural: ctenidia), a row of peg-like spines in some insects (pronotal ctenidium; genal ctenidium)
- Ctenidium (plant), a genus of mosses in the family Hylocomiaceae
- Ctenidia (beetle), a genus of beetles in the family Mordellidae
