= Tomoxia howensis =

Scientific classification
- Domain: Eukaryota
- Kingdom: Animalia
- Phylum: Arthropoda
- Class: Insecta
- Order: Coleoptera
- Suborder: Polyphaga
- Infraorder: Cucujiformia
- Family: Mordellidae
- Genus: Tomoxia
- Species: T. howensis

Binomial name
- Tomoxia howensis Lea, 1917

Species of beetle

Tomoxia howensis is a species of beetle in the genus Tomoxia of the family Mordellidae. It was described by Lea in 1917.
