= Anaspis sericea =

Scientific classification
- Domain: Eukaryota
- Kingdom: Animalia
- Phylum: Arthropoda
- Class: Insecta
- Order: Coleoptera
- Suborder: Polyphaga
- Infraorder: Cucujiformia
- Family: Scraptiidae
- Tribe: Anaspidini
- Genus: Anaspis
- Species: A. sericea

Binomial name
- Anaspis sericea Mannerheim, 1843

Species of beetle

Anaspis sericea is a species of false flower beetle in the family Scraptiidae. It is found in North America.
