= Tomoxia laticeps =

Scientific classification
- Domain: Eukaryota
- Kingdom: Animalia
- Phylum: Arthropoda
- Class: Insecta
- Order: Coleoptera
- Suborder: Polyphaga
- Infraorder: Cucujiformia
- Family: Mordellidae
- Genus: Tomoxia
- Species: T. laticeps

Binomial name
- Tomoxia laticeps Lea, 1895

Species of beetle

Tomoxia laticeps is a species of beetle in the genus Tomoxia of the family Mordellidae. It was described by Lea in 1895.
