= Ham Street Woods =

Nature area in Kent, England

Coordinates: 51.073°N 0.866°E

- Site of Special Scientific Interest
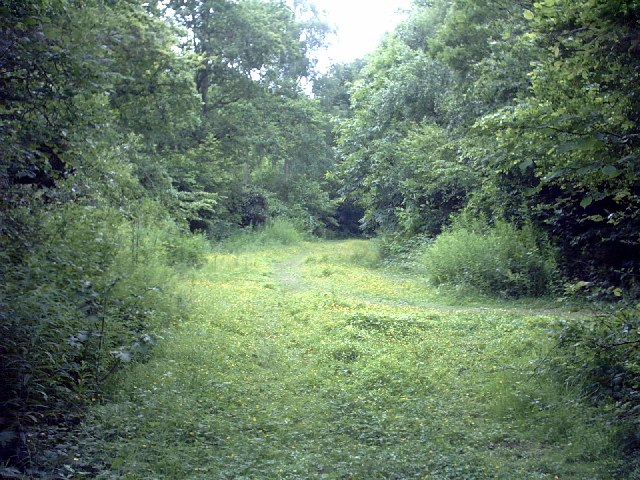
- Location of Ham Street Woods.
- Area of search: Kent
- Grid reference: TR 009 343
- Interest: Biological
- Area: 175.2 hectares (433 acres)
- Notification date: 1989
- Location map: Magic Map

Ham Street Woods is a 175.2-hectare (433-acre) biological Site of Special Scientific Interest south of Ashford in Kent. It is a Nature Conservation Review site, Grade I, and an area of 97.1 hectares (240 acres) is a National Nature Reserve.

This semi-natural wood is more than 400 years old, and it has rich and diverse invertebrates, including 12 rare or scarce dead wood species, such as the nationally rare beetle, Tomoxia biguttata.

There is access from the Greensand Way, which crosses the site. The wood comprises Barrow Wood, Bourne Wood and Carter's Wood, the latter two having residential roads named after them in Hamstreet.
