= Diclidia laetula =

Scientific classification
- Kingdom: Animalia
- Phylum: Arthropoda
- Class: Insecta
- Order: Coleoptera
- Suborder: Polyphaga
- Infraorder: Cucujiformia
- Family: Scraptiidae
- Tribe: Pentariini
- Genus: Diclidia
- Species: D. laetula

Binomial name
- Diclidia laetula (LeConte, 1858)

Species of beetle

Diclidia laetula is a species of false flower beetle in the family Scraptiidae. It is found in North America.
