= Scraptia sericea =

Scientific classification
- Domain: Eukaryota
- Kingdom: Animalia
- Phylum: Arthropoda
- Class: Insecta
- Order: Coleoptera
- Suborder: Polyphaga
- Infraorder: Cucujiformia
- Family: Scraptiidae
- Tribe: Scraptiini
- Genus: Scraptia
- Species: S. sericea

Binomial name
- Scraptia sericea Melsheimer, 1846

Species of beetle

Scraptia sericea is a species of false flower beetle in the family Scraptiidae. It is found in North America.
