= Petrimordella =

Scientific classification
- Kingdom: Animalia
- Phylum: Arthropoda
- Class: Insecta
- Order: Coleoptera
- Suborder: Polyphaga
- Infraorder: Cucujiformia
- Family: Mordellidae
- Genus: †Petrimordella; Batelka et al, 2023

Extinct group of beetles

Petrimordella is a collective group of extinct beetle species, in the tumbing flower beetle family Mordellidae. A collective or informal group is a convenient way to classify a group of species that cannot be allocated with confidence to normal genera. Collective groups are treated as genus-group names with special provisions.

The species of Petrimordella have been found in the Oligocene of France and Germany, and in the Eocene of Colorado.

== Species ==
The following species are included in the group Petrimordella.

- †Petrimordella indata Statz 1952
- †Petrimordella inundata Wickham 1914
- †Petrimordella lapidicola Wickham 1909
- †Petrimordella nearctica Wickham 1914
- †Petrimordella nigrapilosa Statz 1952
- †Petrimordella oligocenica Nel 1985
- †Petrimordella priscula Cockerell 1925
- †Petrimordella protogaea Wickham 1914
- †Petrimordella rasnitsyni Odnosum & Perkovsky 2016
- †Petrimordella scudderiana Wickham 1914
- †Petrimordella smithiana Wickham 1913
- †Petrimordella stygia Wickham 1914
