= Tomoxia flavicans =

Scientific classification
- Domain: Eukaryota
- Kingdom: Animalia
- Phylum: Arthropoda
- Class: Insecta
- Order: Coleoptera
- Suborder: Polyphaga
- Infraorder: Cucujiformia
- Family: Mordellidae
- Genus: Tomoxia
- Species: T. flavicans

Binomial name
- Tomoxia flavicans Waterhouse, 1878

Species of beetle

Tomoxia flavicans is a species of beetle in the Tomoxia genus of the Mordellidae family. It was described by Frederick George Waterhouse in 1878.
