= Petrimordella nearctica =

Petrimordella nearctica Temporal range: Chadronian

Scientific classification
- Kingdom: Animalia
- Phylum: Arthropoda
- Class: Insecta
- Order: Coleoptera
- Suborder: Polyphaga
- Infraorder: Cucujiformia
- Family: Mordellidae
- Informal group: †Petrimordella
- Species: †P. nearctica

Binomial name
- †Petrimordella nearctica (Wickham, 1914)

Synonyms
- Mordellistena nearctica Wickham, 1914

Species of beetle

Petrimordella nearctica is a fossil species of tumbling flower beetles the family Mordellidae. It was discovered in the Florissant Formation of Colorado.

Petrimordella is a collective group, a convenient way to classify a group of species that cannot be allocated with confidence to normal genera. Collective groups are treated as genus-group names with special provisions.
