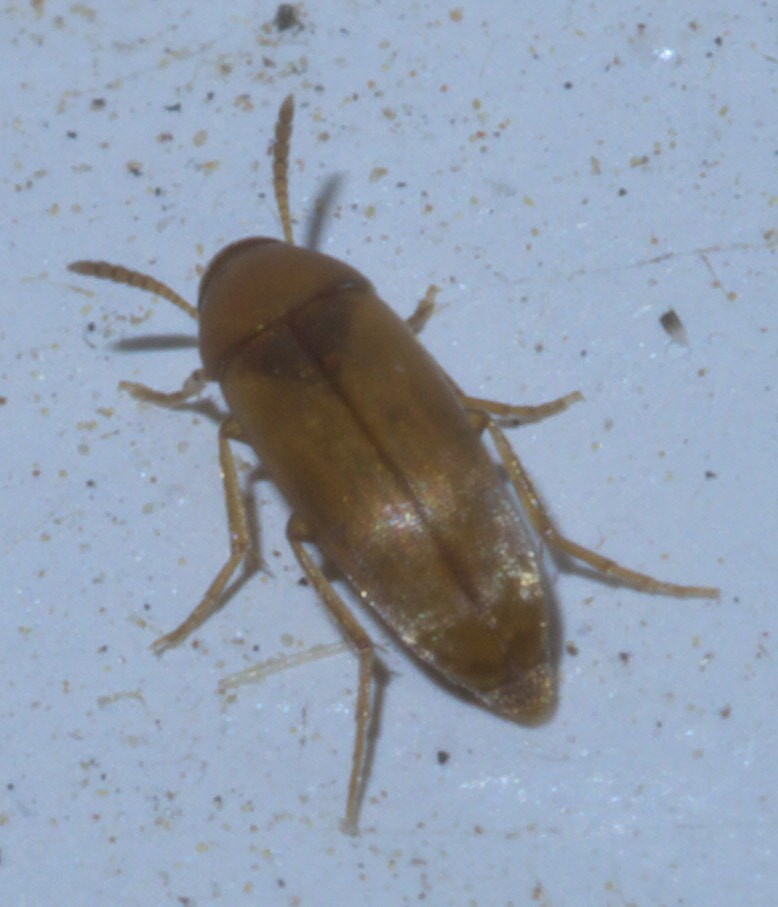

Scientific classification
- Domain: Eukaryota
- Kingdom: Animalia
- Phylum: Arthropoda
- Class: Insecta
- Order: Coleoptera
- Suborder: Polyphaga
- Infraorder: Cucujiformia
- Family: Scraptiidae
- Genus: Anaspis
- Species: A. rufa

Binomial name
- Anaspis rufa Say, 1826

= Anaspis rufa =

Species of beetle

Anaspis rufa is a species of false flower beetle in the family Scraptiidae. It is found in North America.

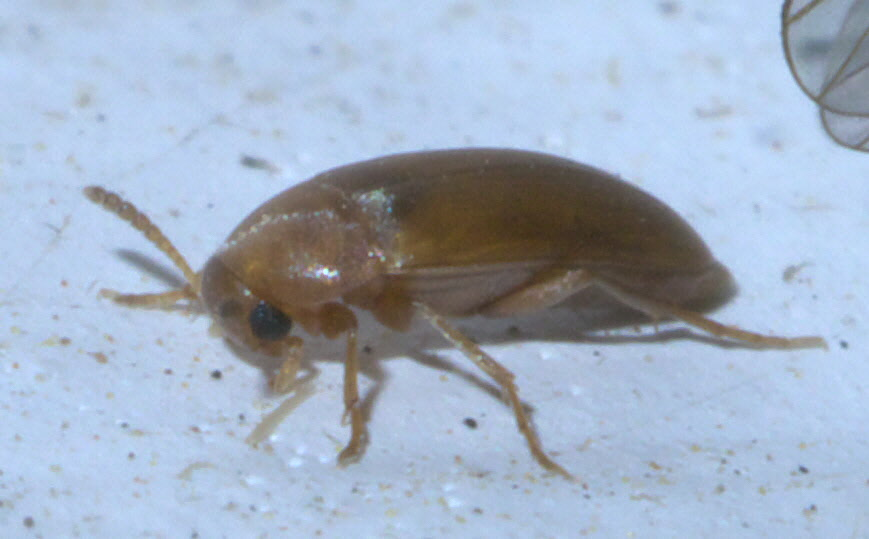
