= Canifa pusilla =

Scientific classification
- Domain: Eukaryota
- Kingdom: Animalia
- Phylum: Arthropoda
- Class: Insecta
- Order: Coleoptera
- Suborder: Polyphaga
- Infraorder: Cucujiformia
- Family: Scraptiidae
- Tribe: Scraptiini
- Genus: Canifa
- Species: C. pusilla

Binomial name
- Canifa pusilla (Haldeman, 1848)

Species of beetle

Canifa pusilla is a species of false flower beetle in the family Scraptiidae. It is found in North America.
