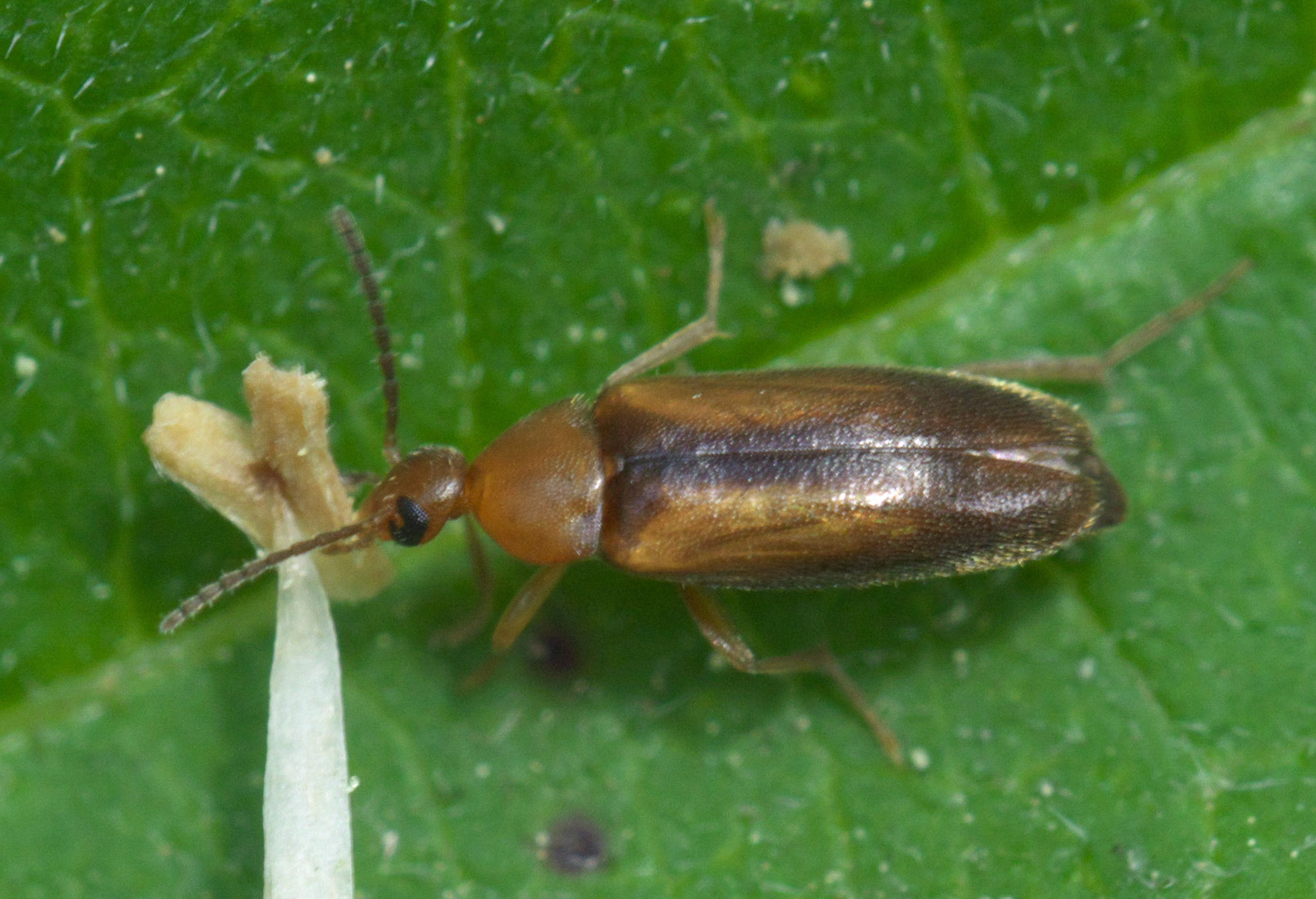

Scientific classification
- Domain: Eukaryota
- Kingdom: Animalia
- Phylum: Arthropoda
- Class: Insecta
- Order: Coleoptera
- Suborder: Polyphaga
- Infraorder: Cucujiformia
- Family: Scraptiidae
- Tribe: Allopodini
- Genus: Allopoda
- Species: A. lutea

Binomial name
- Allopoda lutea (Haldeman, 1848)

= Allopoda lutea =

Species of beetle

Allopoda lutea is a species of false flower beetle in the family Scraptiidae. It is found in North America.
