= Petrimordella nigrapilosa =

Petrimordella nigrapilosa Temporal range: Chattian

Scientific classification
- Kingdom: Animalia
- Phylum: Arthropoda
- Class: Insecta
- Order: Coleoptera
- Suborder: Polyphaga
- Infraorder: Cucujiformia
- Family: Mordellidae
- Informal group: †Petrimordella
- Species: †P. nigrapilosa

Binomial name
- †Petrimordella nigrapilosa (Statz 1952)

Synonyms
- Mordella nigrapilosa Statz 1952

Species of beetle

Petrimordella nigrapilosa is an extinct species of beetle in the collective group Petrimordella. It was discovered in Germany (North Rhine-Westphalia).
