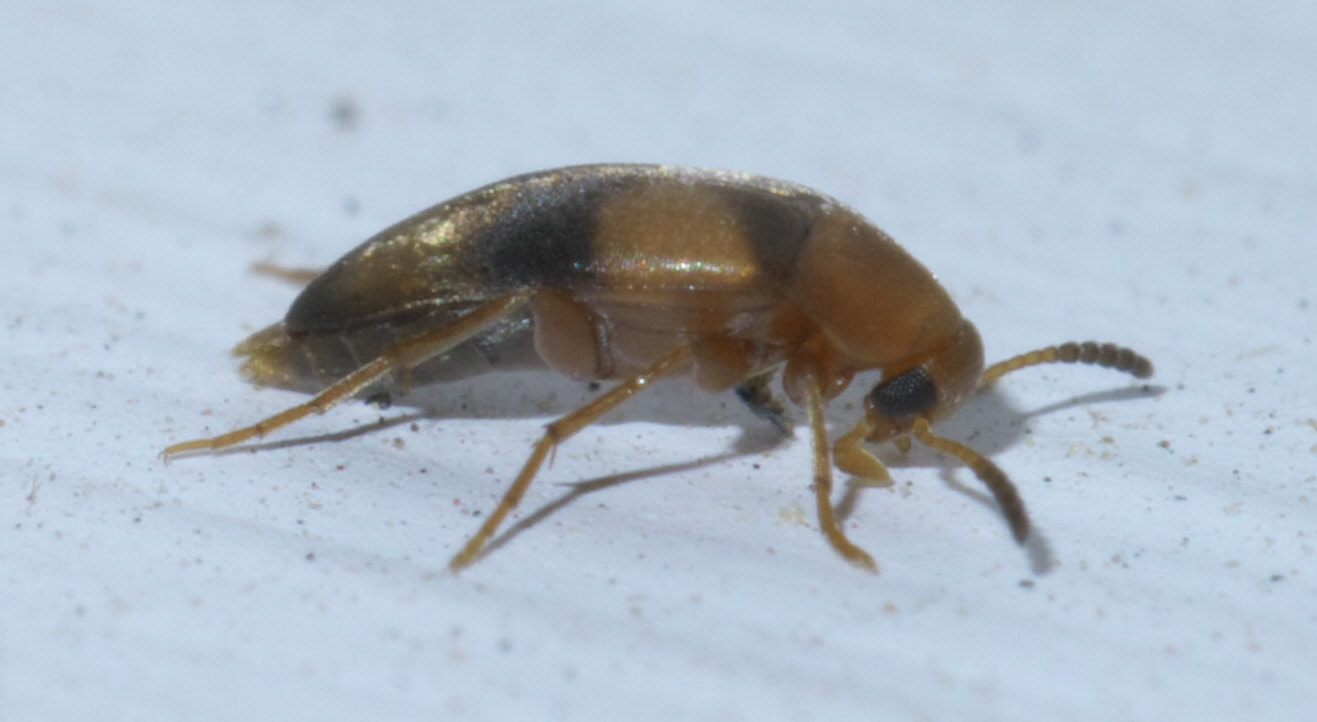

Scientific classification
- Domain: Eukaryota
- Kingdom: Animalia
- Phylum: Arthropoda
- Class: Insecta
- Order: Coleoptera
- Suborder: Polyphaga
- Infraorder: Cucujiformia
- Family: Scraptiidae
- Genus: Pentaria
- Species: P. trifasciata

Binomial name
- Pentaria trifasciata (Melsheimer, 1846)

= Pentaria trifasciata =

Species of beetle

Pentaria trifasciata is a species of false flower beetle in the family Scraptiidae. It is found in North America.

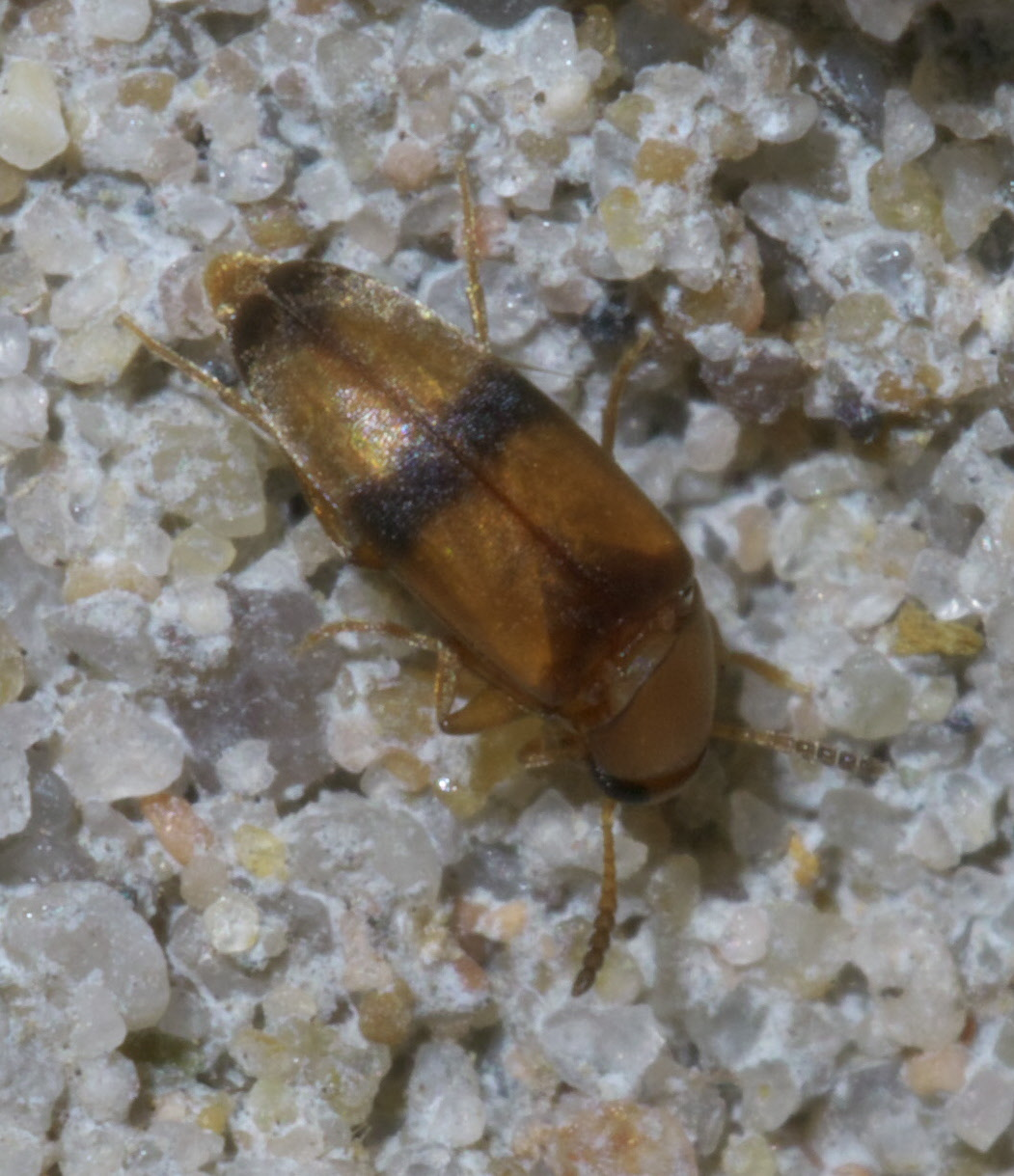
