= Praemordella =

Scientific classification
- Domain: Eukaryota
- Kingdom: Animalia
- Phylum: Arthropoda
- Class: Insecta
- Order: Coleoptera
- Suborder: Polyphaga
- Infraorder: Cucujiformia
- Family: Mordellidae
- Subfamily: †Praemordellinae
- Genus: †Praemordella; Scegoleva-Barovskaja, 1929
- Species: †P. martynovi

Binomial name
- †Praemordella martynovi Shchegoleva-Barovskaya, 1929

Genus of beetles

Praemordella is a fossil genus of tumbling flower beetles in the family Mordellidae. This genus has a single species, Praemordella martynovi. It was discovered in Kazakhstan.
