= Mirimordella =

Mirimordella Temporal range: Late Pleistocene-Holocene

Scientific classification
- Domain: Eukaryota
- Kingdom: Animalia
- Phylum: Arthropoda
- Class: Insecta
- Order: Coleoptera
- Suborder: Polyphaga
- Infraorder: Cucujiformia
- Superfamily: Tenebrionoidea
- Family: Mordellidae
- Subfamily: †Praemordellinae
- Genus: †Mirimordella; Liu, Lu & Ren, 2007
- Species: †M. gracilicruralis

Binomial name
- †Mirimordella gracilicruralis Liu, Lu & Ren, 2007

Extinct species of beetle

Mirimordella gracilicruralis is a fossil species of beetles in the family Mordellidae, the only species in the genus Mirimordella.
