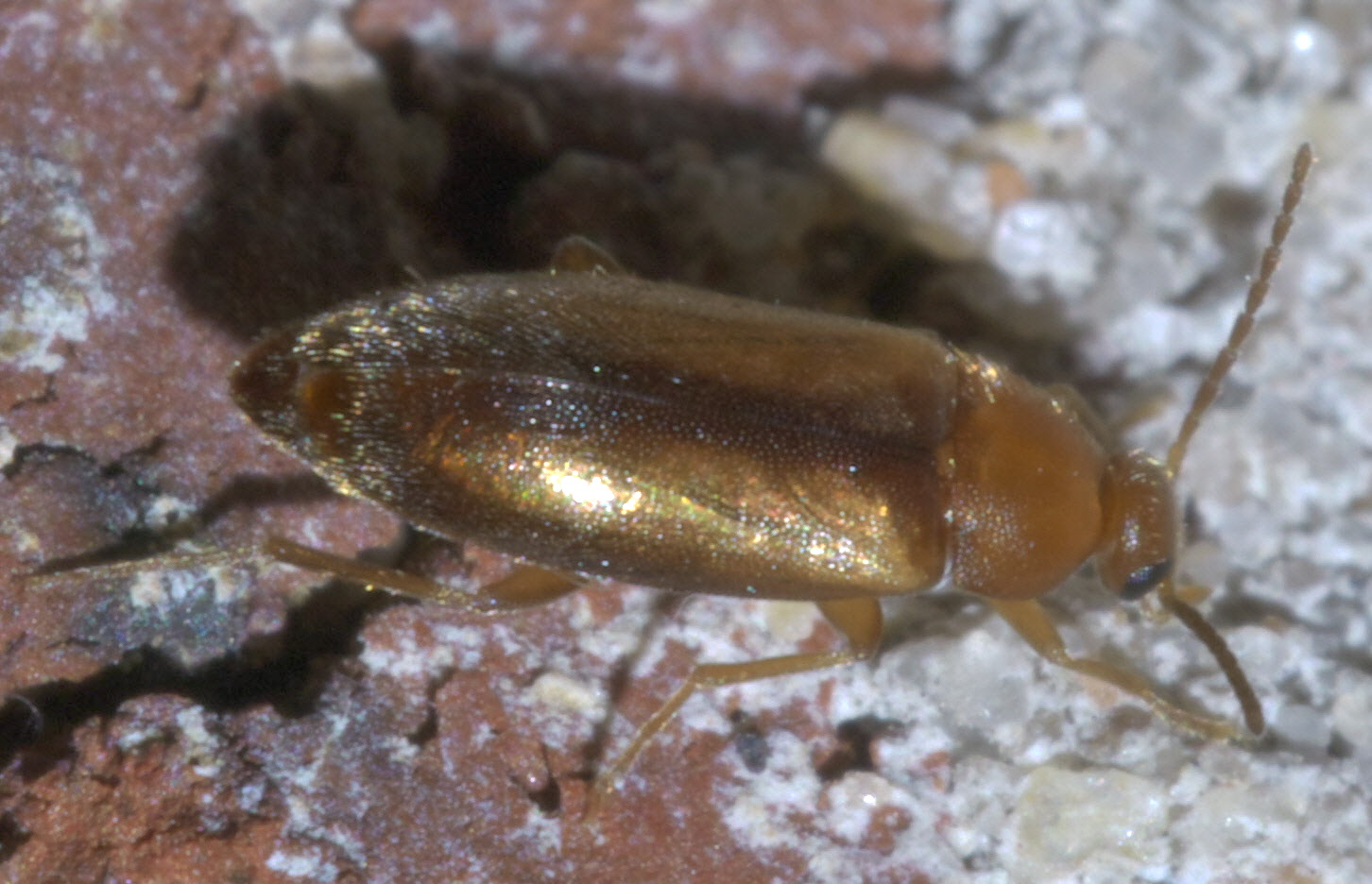

Scientific classification
- Kingdom: Animalia
- Phylum: Arthropoda
- Class: Insecta
- Order: Coleoptera
- Suborder: Polyphaga
- Infraorder: Cucujiformia
- Family: Scraptiidae
- Subfamily: Scraptiinae
- Tribe: Allopodini
- Genus: Allopoda; LeConte, 1866

= Allopoda =

Genus of beetles

Allopoda is a genus of false flower beetles in the family Scraptiidae. There are at least three described species in Allopoda.

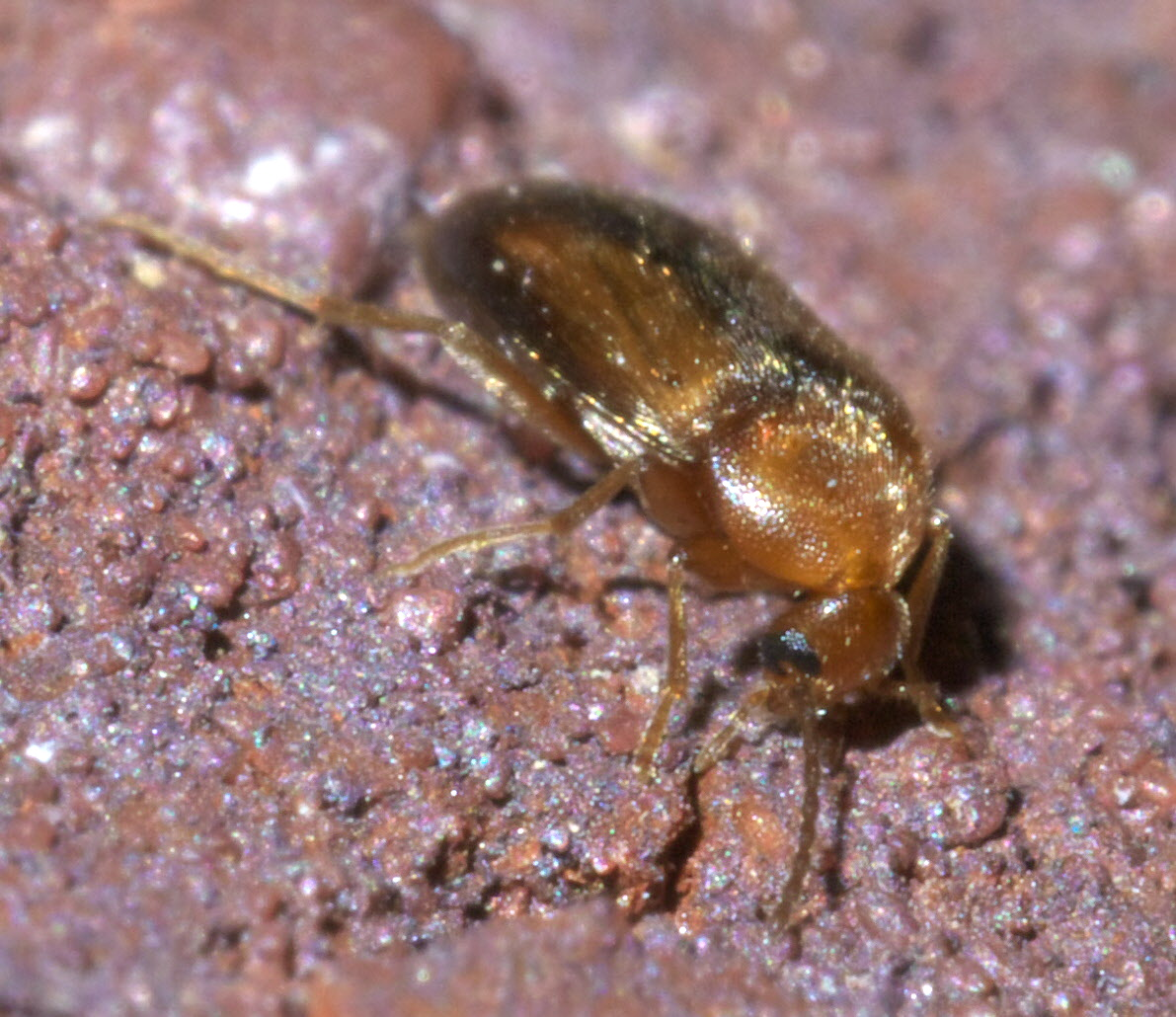

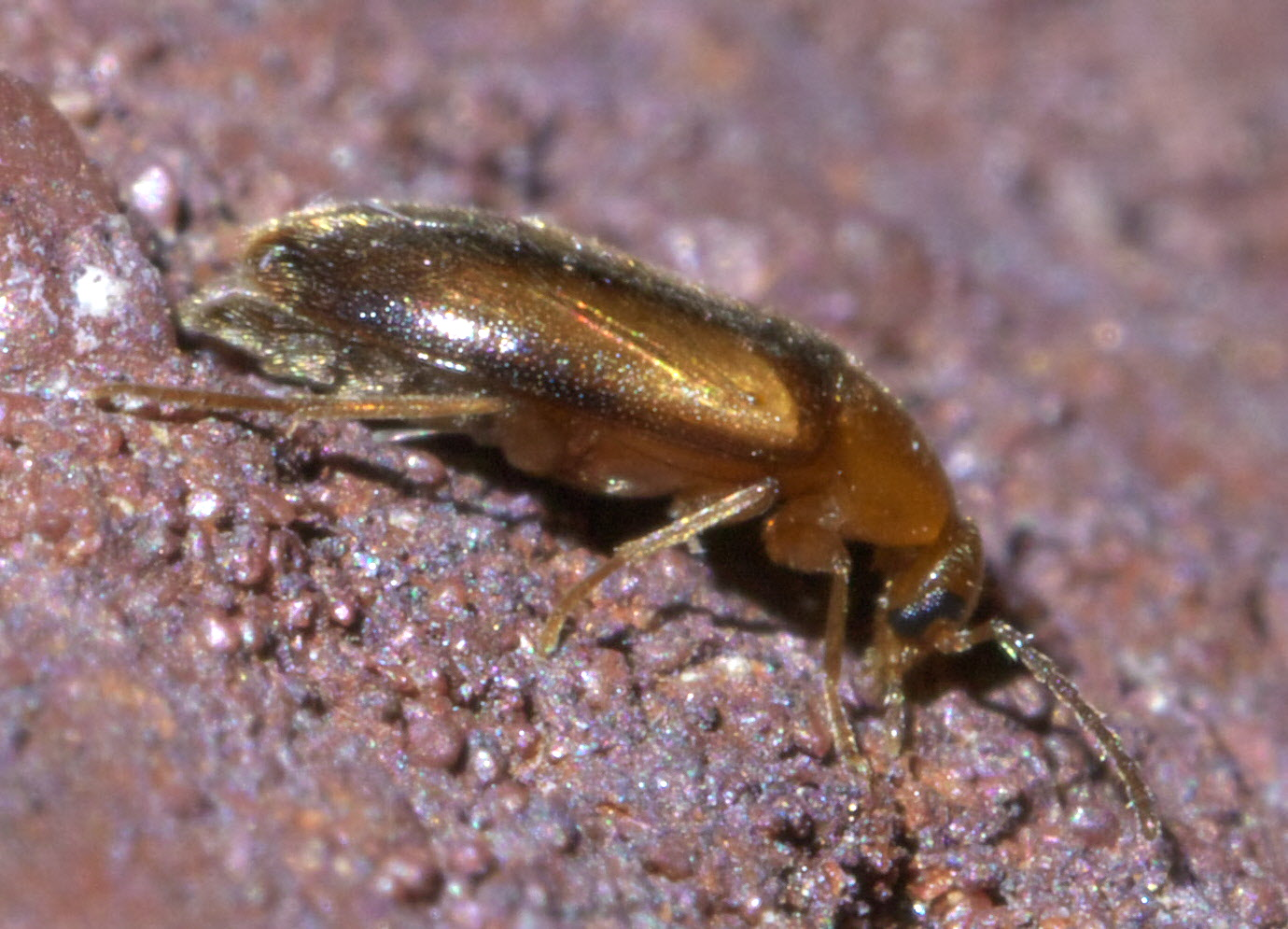

== Species ==
These three species belong to the genus Allopoda:

- Allopoda arizonica Schaeffer, 1917
- Allopoda californica Schaeffer, 1917
- Allopoda lutea (Haldeman, 1848)
