= Liaoximordella =

Scientific classification
- Domain: Eukaryota
- Kingdom: Animalia
- Phylum: Arthropoda
- Class: Insecta
- Order: Coleoptera
- Suborder: Polyphaga
- Infraorder: Cucujiformia
- Family: Mordellidae
- Genus: †Liaoximordella; Wang, 1993
- Species: †L. hongi

Binomial name
- †Liaoximordella hongi Wang, 1993

Species of beetle

Liaoximordella hongi is an extinct species of beetle in the family Mordellidae, the only species in the extinct genus Liaoximordella. It was discovered in China.
