= Cyrtanaspis =

Scientific classification
- Domain: Eukaryota
- Kingdom: Animalia
- Phylum: Arthropoda
- Class: Insecta
- Order: Coleoptera
- Suborder: Polyphaga
- Infraorder: Cucujiformia
- Family: Scraptiidae
- Genus: Cyrtanaspis; Emery, 1876

Genus of beetles

Cyrtanaspis is a genus of beetles belonging to the family Scraptiidae.

Species:

- Cyrtanaspis phalerata Germar, 1831
- Cyrtanaspis sauteri Pic, 1911
