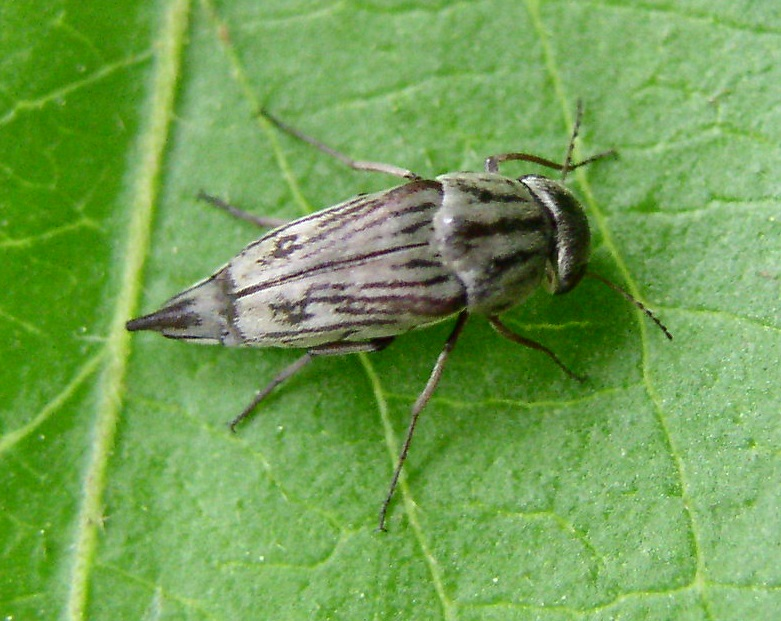

Scientific classification
- Domain: Eukaryota
- Kingdom: Animalia
- Phylum: Arthropoda
- Class: Insecta
- Order: Coleoptera
- Suborder: Polyphaga
- Infraorder: Cucujiformia
- Family: Mordellidae
- Genus: Tomoxia
- Species: T. lineella

Binomial name
- Tomoxia lineella LeConte, 1862

= Tomoxia lineella =

Species of beetle

Tomoxia lineella is a species of beetle in the genus Tomoxia of the family Mordellidae. It was described by John Lawrence LeConte in 1862.
