= Diclidia =

Scientific classification
- Kingdom: Animalia
- Phylum: Arthropoda
- Class: Insecta
- Order: Coleoptera
- Suborder: Polyphaga
- Infraorder: Cucujiformia
- Family: Scraptiidae
- Subfamily: Anaspidinae
- Tribe: Pentariini
- Genus: Diclidia; LeConte, 1862

Genus of beetles

Diclidia is a genus of false flower beetles in the family Scraptiidae. There are about 11 described species in Diclidia.

== Species ==
These 11 species belong to the genus Diclidia:

- Diclidia gilva Liljeblad, 1921
- Diclidia greeni Liljeblad, 1918
- Diclidia inyoensis Liljeblad, 1921
- Diclidia laetula (LeConte, 1858)
- Diclidia liljebladi
- Diclidia mexicana Ray
- Diclidia obscura Liljeblad, 1945
- Diclidia propinqua Liljeblad, 1918
- Diclidia sexmaculata Liljeblad, 1945
- Diclidia sordida Liljeblad, 1945
- Diclidia spinea Liljeblad, 1945
