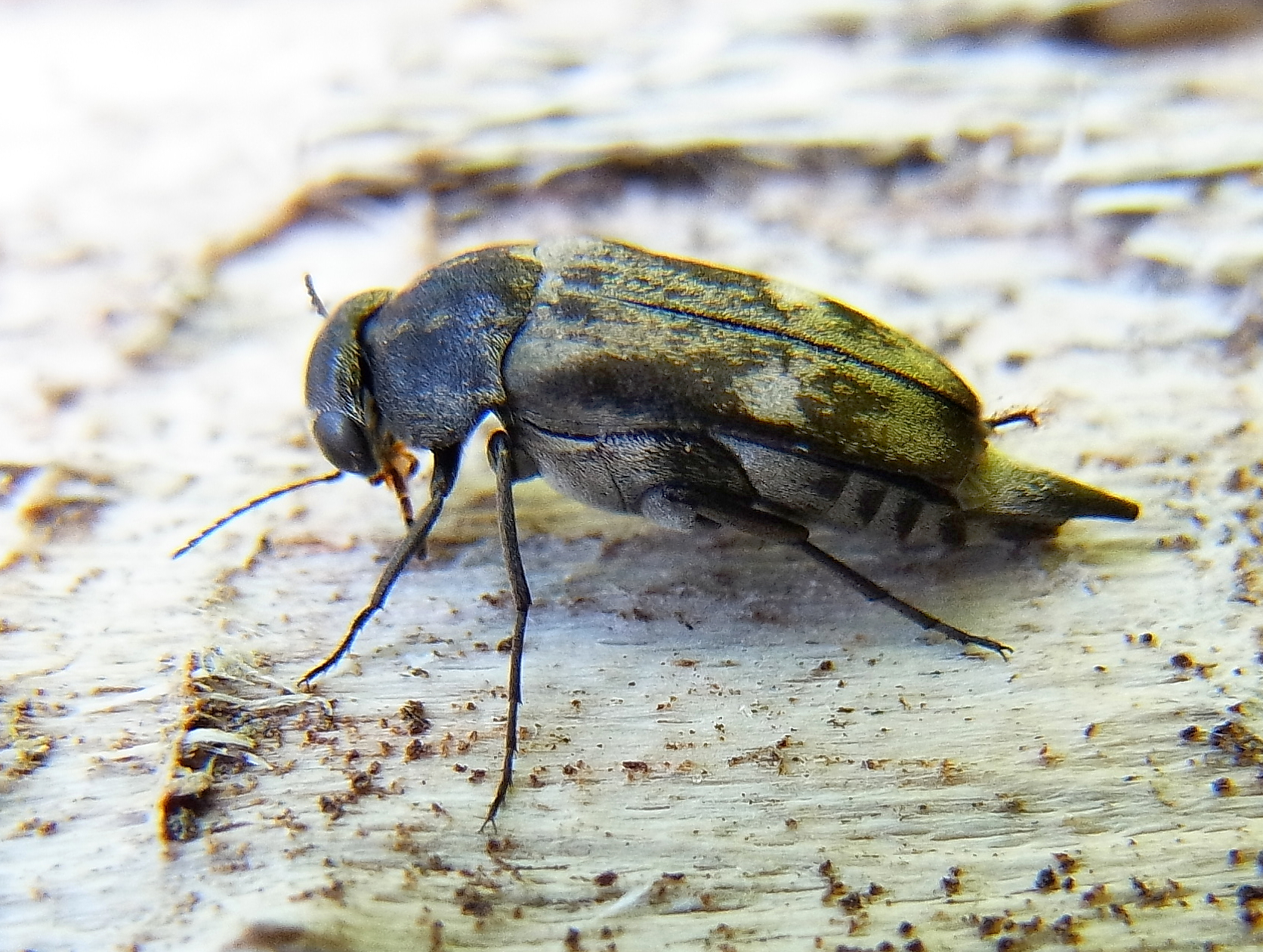

Scientific classification
- Kingdom: Animalia
- Phylum: Arthropoda
- Clade: Pancrustacea
- Class: Insecta
- Order: Coleoptera
- Suborder: Polyphaga
- Infraorder: Cucujiformia
- Family: Mordellidae
- Genus: Tomoxia
- Species: T. bucephala

Binomial name
- Tomoxia bucephala (Costa, 1854)

Synonyms
- Mordella bucephala Costa, 1854; Mordella biguttata Gyllenhal, 1827

= Tomoxia bucephala =

Species of beetle

Tomoxia bucephala is a species of beetle in the genus Tomoxia of the family Mordellidae. It was redescribed by Achille Costa in 1854. It originally had Palearctic distribution, but has since 2015 also been found in North America. It feeds on wood-decaying fungi, both as larvae and adults. The species overwinters as a larva.
