= Petrimordella inundata =

Petrimordella inundata Temporal range: Middle Eocene

Scientific classification
- Kingdom: Animalia
- Phylum: Arthropoda
- Class: Insecta
- Order: Coleoptera
- Suborder: Polyphaga
- Infraorder: Cucujiformia
- Family: Mordellidae
- Informal group: †Petrimordella
- Species: †P. inundata

Binomial name
- †Petrimordella inundata (Wickham, 1914)

Synonyms
- Tomoxia inundata Wickham, 1914

Species of beetle

Petrimordella inundata is an extinct species of beetle in the collective group Petrimordella of the family Mordellidae. It was discovered in the Florissant Formation of Colorado, in 1914.
