= Pectotoma =

Scientific classification
- Domain: Eukaryota
- Kingdom: Animalia
- Phylum: Arthropoda
- Class: Insecta
- Order: Coleoptera
- Suborder: Polyphaga
- Infraorder: Cucujiformia
- Family: Scraptiidae
- Tribe: Scraptiini
- Genus: Pectotoma; Hatch, 1965
- Species: P. hoppingi

Binomial name
- Pectotoma hoppingi Hatch, 1965

Genus of beetles

Pectotoma is a genus of false flower beetles in the family Scraptiidae. There is one described species in Pectotoma, P. hoppingi.
