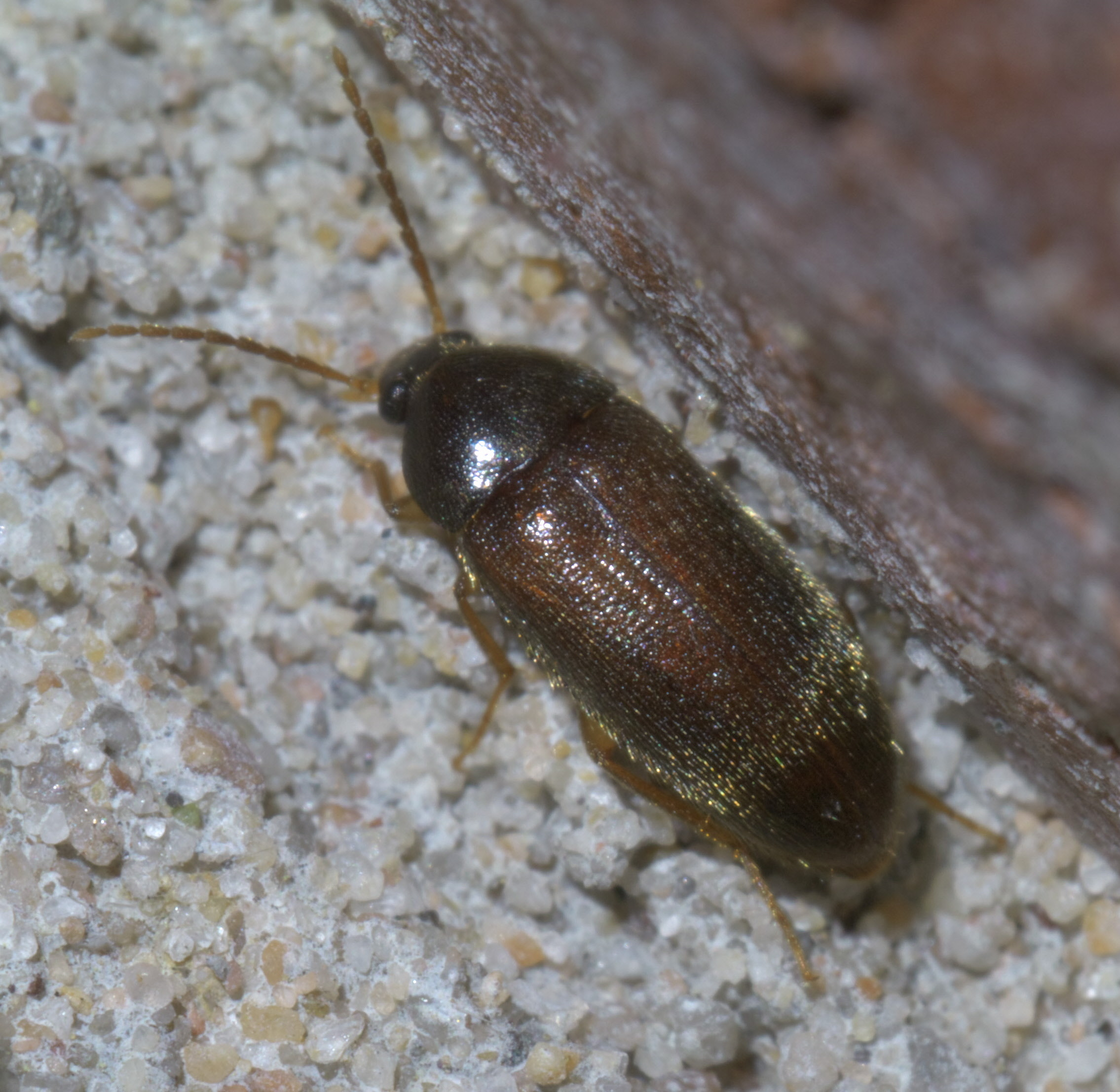

Scientific classification
- Kingdom: Animalia
- Phylum: Arthropoda
- Class: Insecta
- Order: Coleoptera
- Suborder: Polyphaga
- Infraorder: Cucujiformia
- Family: Scraptiidae
- Subfamily: Scraptiinae
- Tribe: Scraptiini
- Genus: Canifa; LeConte, 1866

= Canifa =

Genus of beetles

Canifa is a genus of false flower beetles in the family Scraptiidae. There are at least four described species in Canifa.

== Species ==
These four species belong to the genus Canifa:

- Canifa pallipennis LeConte, 1878
- Canifa pallipes (Melsheimer, 1846)
- Canifa plagiata (Melsheimer, 1846)
- Canifa pusilla (Haldeman, 1848)
