= Petrimordella protogaea =

Scientific classification
- Domain: Eukaryota
- Kingdom: Animalia
- Phylum: Arthropoda
- Class: Insecta
- Order: Coleoptera
- Suborder: Polyphaga
- Infraorder: Cucujiformia
- Family: Mordellidae
- Genus: Mordellistena
- Species: M. protogaoa

Binomial name
- Mordellistena protogaoa Wickham, 1915

Species of beetle

Mordellistena protogaoa is a species of beetle in the genus Mordellistena of the family Mordellidae. It was described by Wickham in 1915.
