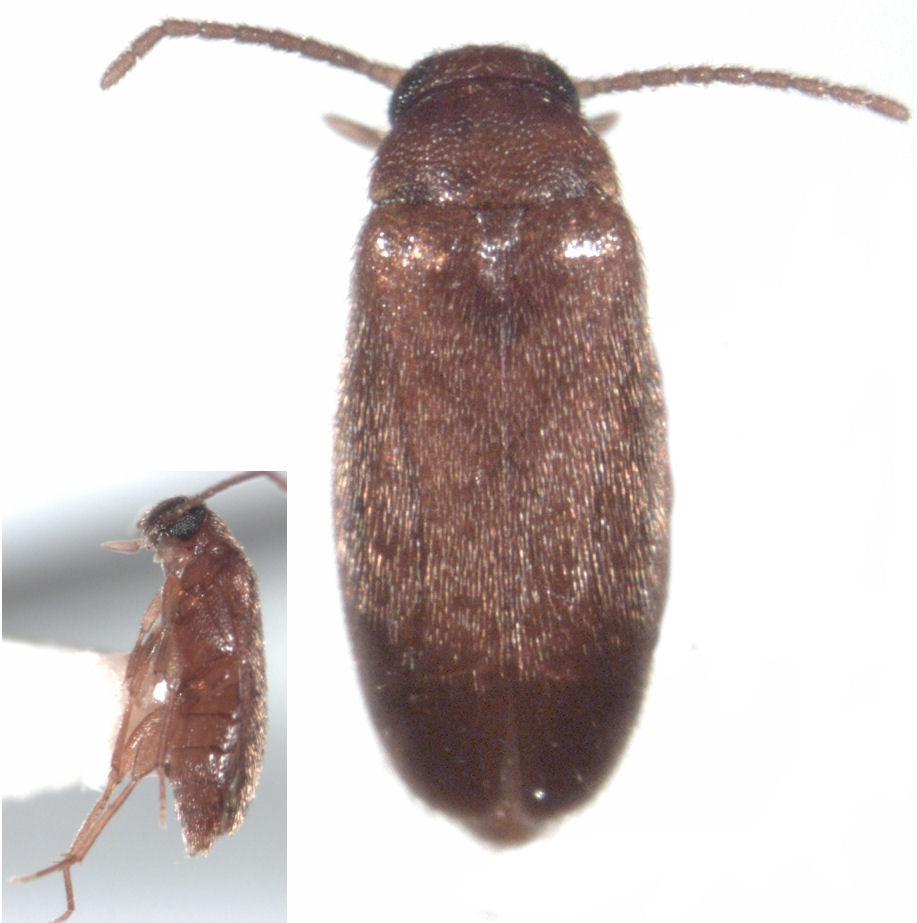

Scientific classification
- Kingdom: Animalia
- Phylum: Arthropoda
- Class: Insecta
- Order: Coleoptera
- Suborder: Polyphaga
- Infraorder: Cucujiformia
- Family: Scraptiidae
- Subfamily: Scraptiinae
- Tribe: Scraptiini
- Genus: Scraptia; Latreille, 1807

= Scraptia =

Genus of beetles

Scraptia is a genus of false flower beetles in the family Scraptiidae. There are more than 20 described species in Scraptia.

== Species ==
These 21 species belong to the genus Scraptia:

- Scraptia bifoveolata Kuster, 1853
- Scraptia clairi Rey, 1892
- Scraptia cribriceps Champion
- Scraptia dubia Olivier, 1790
- Scraptia ferruginea Kiesenwetter, 1861
- Scraptia flavidula Motschulsky, 1863
- Scraptia fuscula Müller, 1821
- Scraptia indica Motschulsky, 1863
- Scraptia jakowleffi Reitter, 1889
- Scraptia longicornis Kiesenwetter, 1861
- Scraptia oculata Schaeffer, 1917
- Scraptia oertzeni Schilsky, 1901
- Scraptia ophthalmica Mulsant, 1856
- Scraptia roubali Winkler, 1927
- Scraptia schotti Leblanc, 2012
- Scraptia sericea Melsheimer, 1846
- Scraptia testacea Allen, 1940
- † Scraptia inclusa Ermisch, 1941
- † Scraptia longelytrata Ermisch, 1943
- † Scraptia ovata Guérin-Méneville, 1838
- † Scraptia pseudofuscula Ermisch, 1941
