= Ctenidia (beetle) =

Scientific classification
- Domain: Eukaryota
- Kingdom: Animalia
- Phylum: Arthropoda
- Class: Insecta
- Order: Coleoptera
- Suborder: Polyphaga
- Infraorder: Cucujiformia
- Superfamily: Tenebrionoidea
- Family: Mordellidae
- Subfamily: Ctenidiinae
- Genus: Ctenidia; Laporte de Castelnau in Brullé, 1840
- Species: C. mordelloides

Binomial name
- Ctenidia mordelloides Laporte de Castelnau in Brullé, 1840

Species of beetle

Ctenidia mordelloides is a species of beetle in the family Mordellidae, the only species in the genus Ctenidia and the only species in the subfamily Ctenidiinae. It is known from South Africa.
