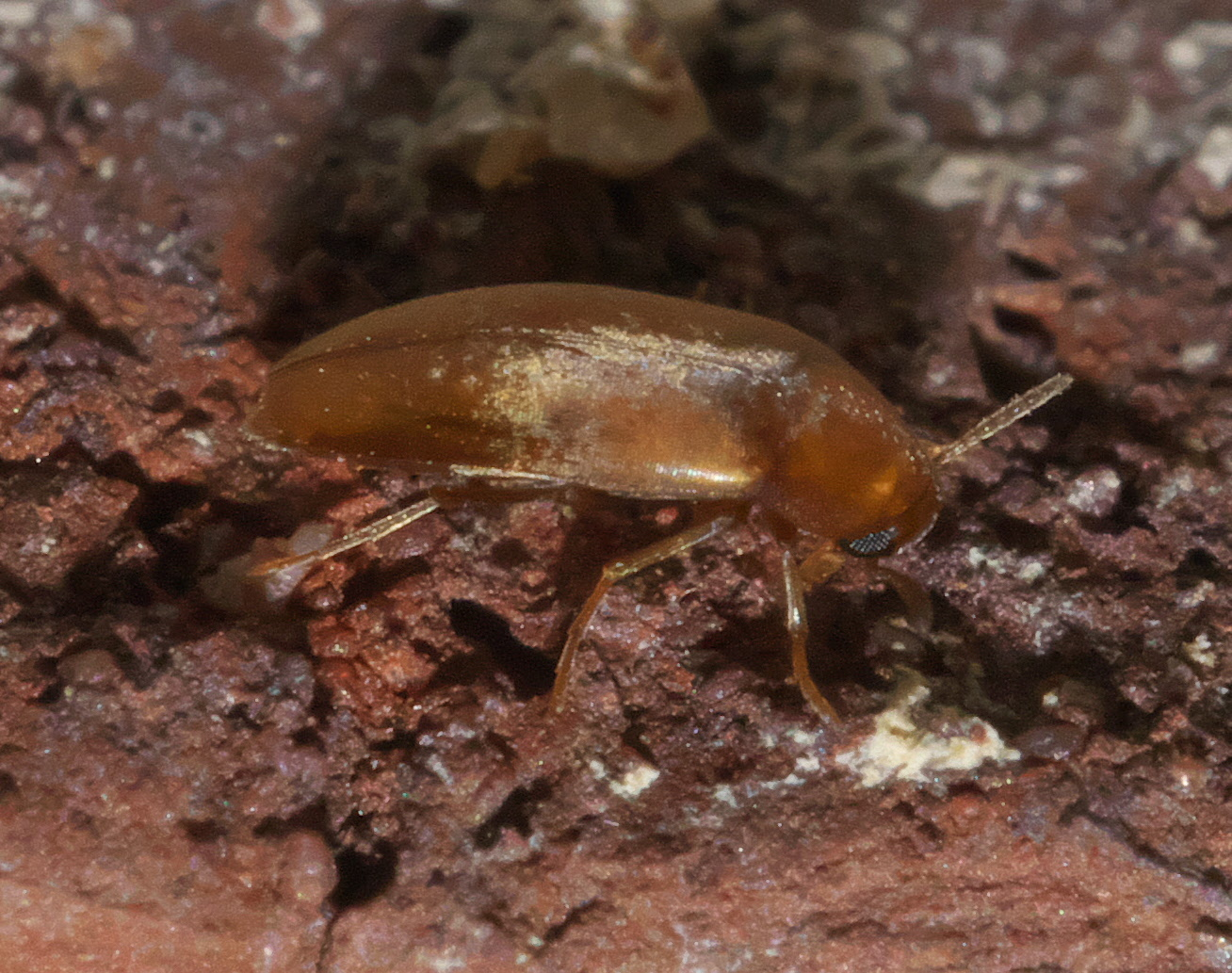

Scientific classification
- Domain: Eukaryota
- Kingdom: Animalia
- Phylum: Arthropoda
- Class: Insecta
- Order: Coleoptera
- Suborder: Polyphaga
- Infraorder: Cucujiformia
- Family: Scraptiidae
- Genus: Pentaria; Mulsant, 1856

Synonyms
- Anthobatula Strand, 1929

= Pentaria (beetle) =

Genus of beetles

Pentaria is a genus of false flower beetles in the family Scraptiidae. There are about nine described species in Pentaria.

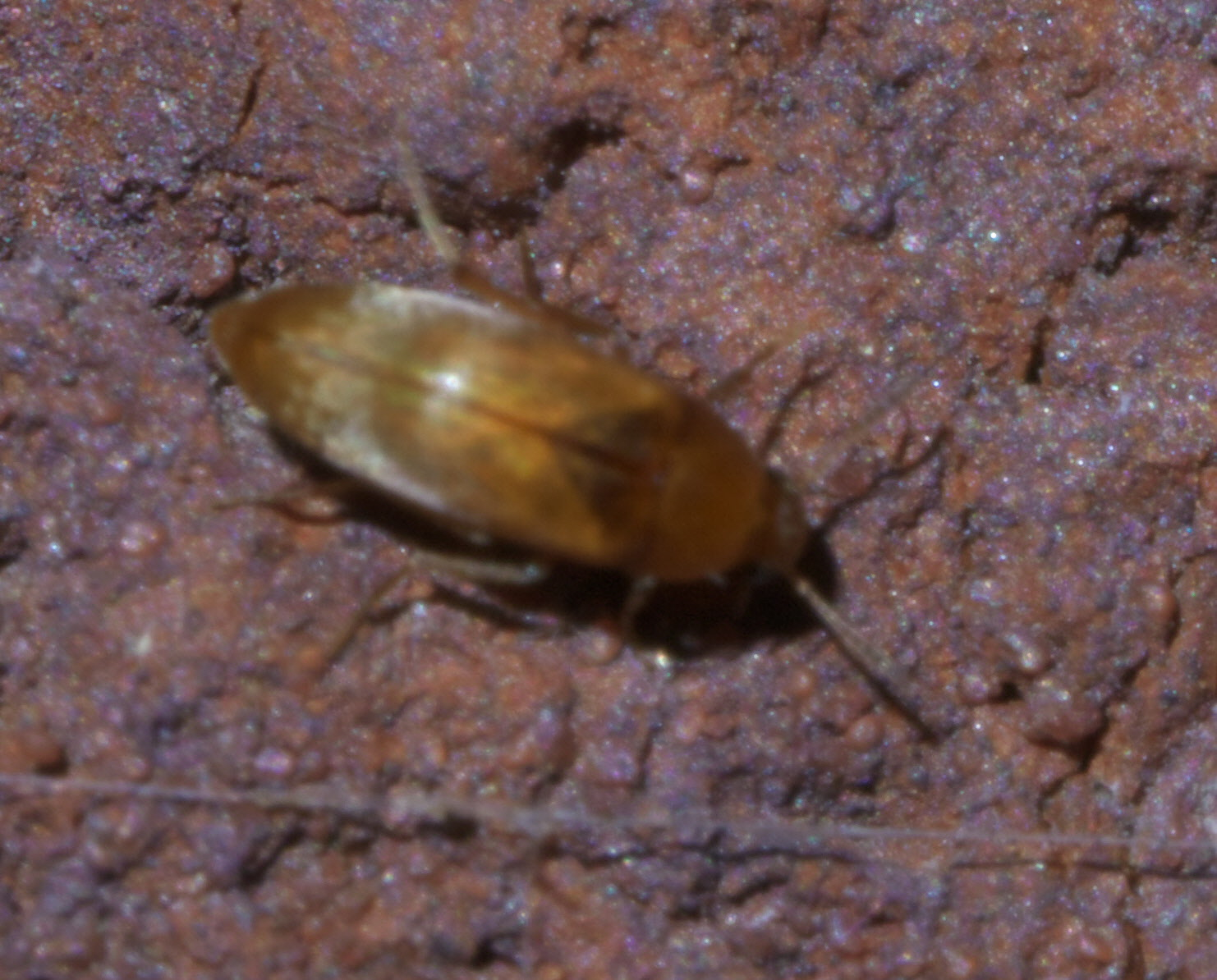

== Species ==
These nine species belong to the genus Pentaria:

- Pentaria arabica Pankow, 1981^{g}
- Pentaria badia (Rosenhauer, 1847)^{g}
- Pentaria bicolor (Liljeblad, 1918)^{i c g}
- Pentaria decolor Champion, 1891^{i c g}
- Pentaria dispar (Liljeblad, 1918)^{i c g b}
- Pentaria fuscula LeConte, 1862^{i c g}
- Pentaria hirsuta Smith, 1882^{i c g}
- Pentaria pallida (Liljeblad, 1918)^{i c g}
- Pentaria trifasciata (Melsheimer, 1846)^{i c g b}

Data sources: i = ITIS, c = Catalogue of Life, g = GBIF, b = Bugguide.net
