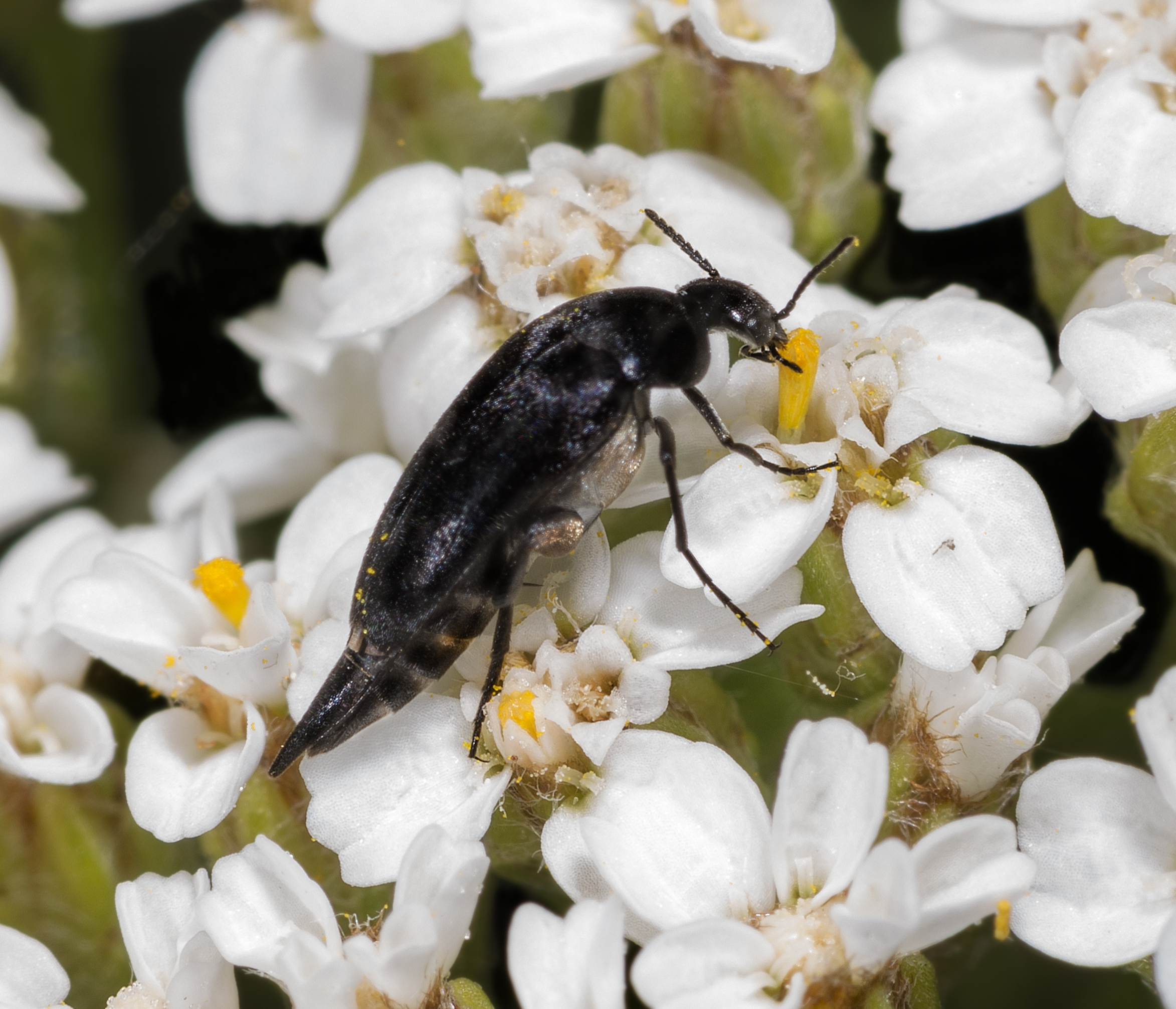
- Mordella aculeata; note the "pintail"

Scientific classification
- Kingdom: Animalia
- Phylum: Arthropoda
- Clade: Pancrustacea
- Class: Insecta
- Order: Coleoptera
- Suborder: Polyphaga
- Infraorder: Cucujiformia
- Superfamily: Tenebrionoidea
- Family: Mordellidae; Latreille, 1802

Subfamilies
- Ctenidiinae Franciscolo, 1951; Mordellinae Latreille, 1802; †Praemordellinae

Synonyms
- Liaoximordellidae

= Mordellidae =

Mordellidae Temporal range: Middle Jurassic–Recent

Family of beetles

The Mordellidae are a family of beetles commonly known as tumbling flower beetles for the typical irregular movements they make when escaping predators, or as pintail beetles due to their elongated abdominal tip. The adults feed on pollen of flowers. Worldwide, there are about 1500 species.

== Anatomy ==
Mordellidae are 1 to 2 cm long beetles and have a hump backed or wedge-shaped profile. They have a 11-segmented antenna which is thread-like and only sometimes serrate, clavate or pectinate (Ctenidiinae). The tarsal formula is are 5-5-4. The femora of the middle leg is slender and enlarged for leaping. The apparent tumbling movements are composed of a series of very rapid separate jumps (each jump of a duration of approximately 80 ms). They result from the beetle's efforts to get itself back into take-off position for flight when it has been in either a lateral or dorsal position. Each individual jump should be considered an extended rotation, performed by one leg of the third leg pair (metapodium). Depending on whether the left or the right metapodium is used as the leg that provides the leverage for take-off, change occurs in the direction of the jump. The energy for propulsion varies with the beetle's immediate muscle work, so that jump lengths and heights vary, with rotation frequencies recorded up to 48 per second (Mordellochroa abdominalis) around the gravitation centre of the body's longitudinal axis. Additional revolving around the transverse axis (at lower frequency) effects spiralling somersaults that are perceived as tumbling. While the pintail (pygidium) is of no significance for the jump, the meta-trochanter-femur (thighs and surrounding rings of the third leg pair) has a great capacity for free rotation (up to 270 degrees, at one level only). This capacity is due to a screw joint that connects the base of the metacoxa to the head of trochanter. The nut gradient is 21 degrees. Technically similar jumps, though less powerful, can be observed in the families Melandryidae (=Serropalpidae) (genus Orchesia) and Scraptiidae (genus Anaspis). Their coxa-trochanter-joints are of similar structure. It is inferred that the capacity of a tumbling form of locomotion is rooted in a common phylogeny and can therefore not be ascribed specifically to Mordellidae. Other authors have pointed out the speciality of the screw joint. Weevils of the genus Trigonopterus, in the Asian tropical rainforest, for example, have an even tighter connective construction in the coxa-trochanter joint than is found in Mordellidae. This construction, however, does not facilitate an equally high angular velocity of the torque. The joint here serves to provide a better grip on plants and easier climbing.

== Systematics ==
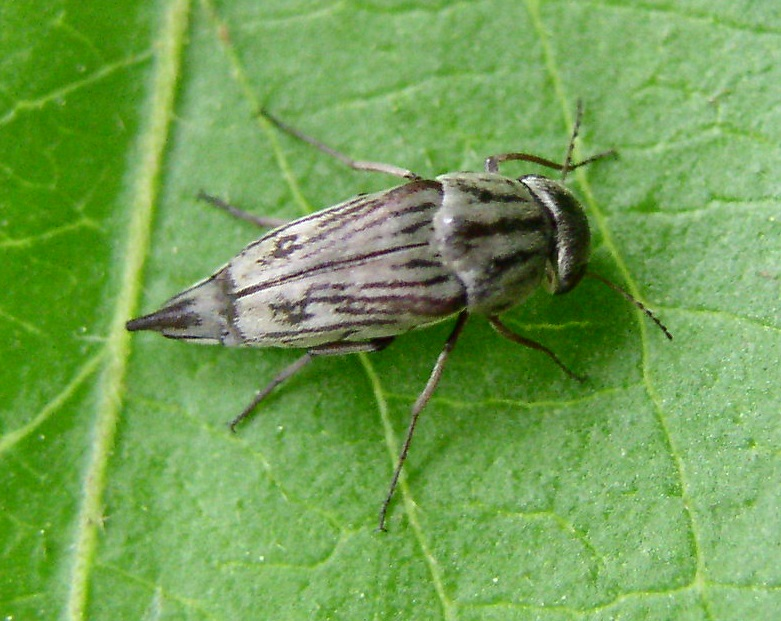
Adult Tomoxia lineella (Mordellinae: Mordellini)

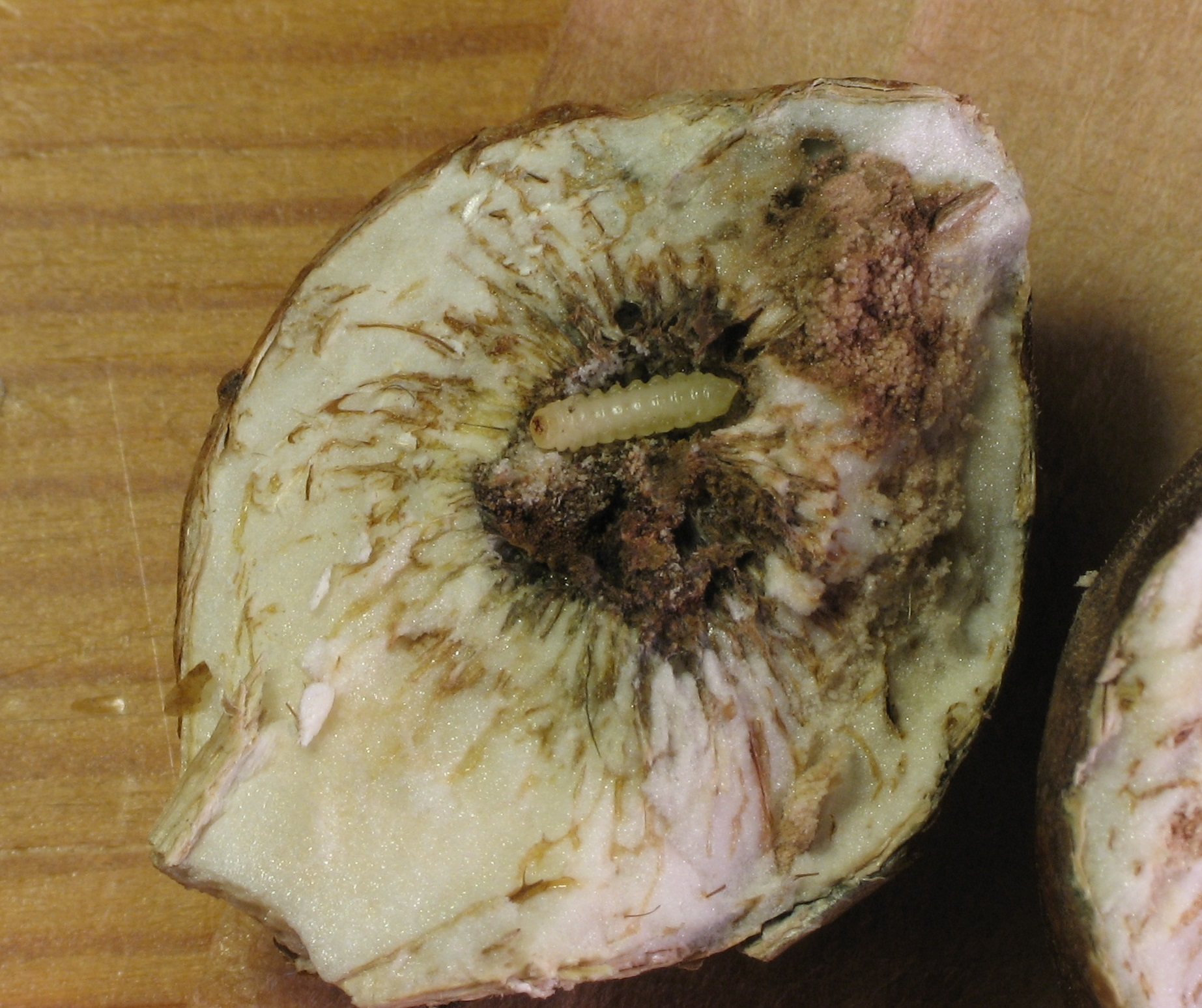
Larva of Mordellistena sp. (Mordellinae: Mordellistenini) larva inside a goldenrod gall made by the fly Eurosta solidaginis

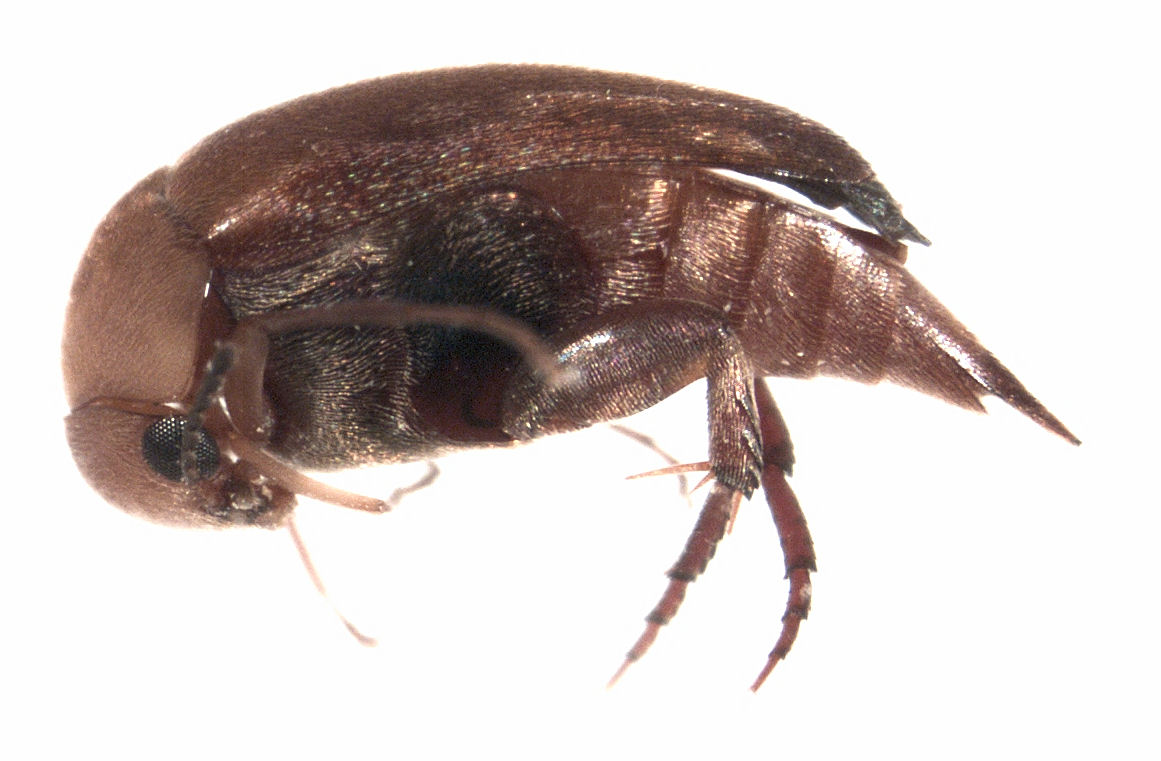
Adult female Tolidopalpus nitidicoma (Mordellinae: Mordellistenini) from side

Mating tumbling flower beetles in a morning glory flower.

Tumbling flower beetles on a daisy

This family has two living subfamilies – Mordellinae and Ctenidiinae – and a prehistoric one known only from fossils (Praemordellinae). Another fossil genus, Liaoximordella, was previously treated as distinct monotypic family Liaoximordellidae, but is now regarded as very primitive and probably basal member of the Mordellidae.

- Subfamily Ctenidiinae Franciscolo, 1951
  - Ctenidia Laporte de Castelnau in Brullé, 1840
- Subfamily Mordellinae Latreille, 1802 (See subfamily for tribes and genera)
- Subfamily †Praemordellinae Shchegoleva-Barovskaya 1929
  - †Bellimordella Liu et al. 2008 Yixian Formation, China, Aptian
  - †Cretanaspis Huang and Yang 1999 Lushangfen Formation, China, Aptian
  - †Mirimordella Liu et al. 2007 Yixian Formation, China, Aptian
  - †Praemordella Shchegoleva-Barovskaya 1929 Karabastau Formation, Kazakhstan, Oxfordian
  - †Wuhua Wang and Zhang 2011 Daohugou, China, Callovian
- Collective group †Petrimordella Batelka et al, 2023 France, Germany, Colorado
