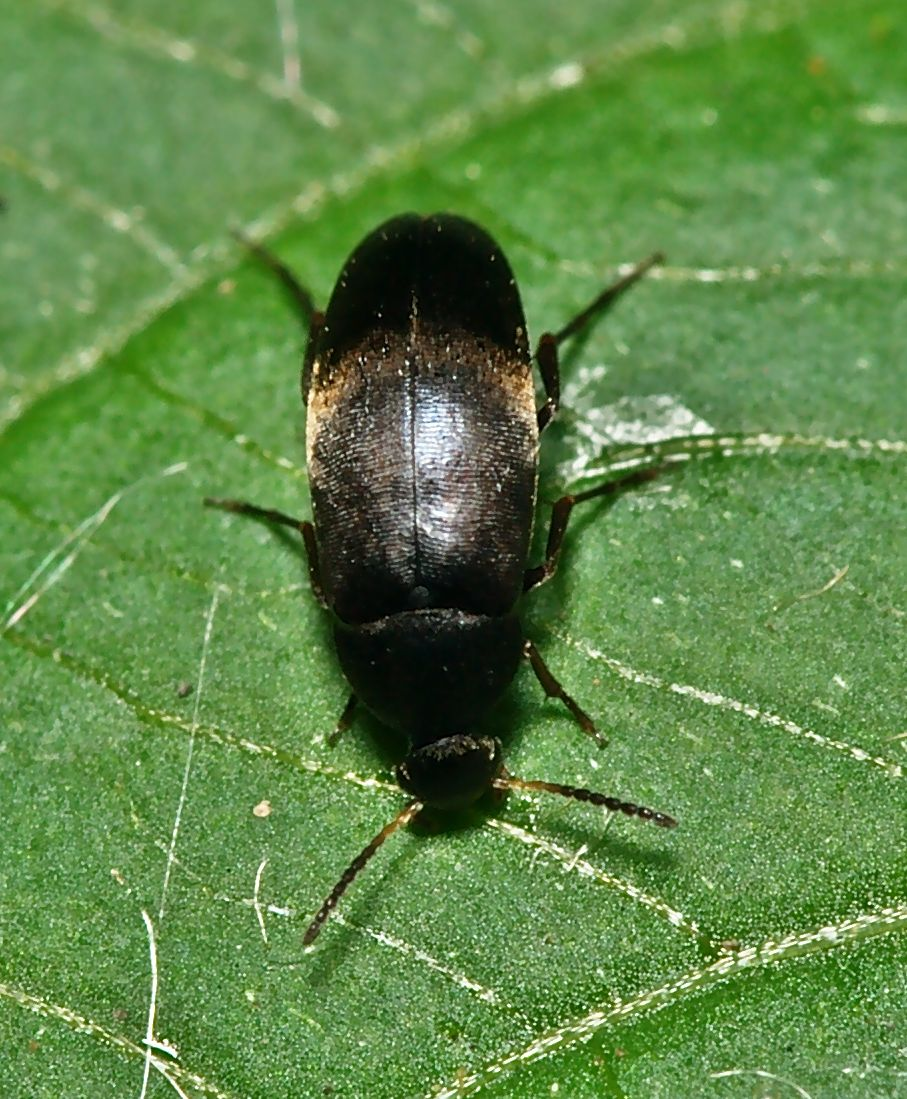
- Anaspis rufilabris from Germany

Scientific classification
- Kingdom: Animalia
- Phylum: Arthropoda
- Clade: Pancrustacea
- Class: Insecta
- Order: Coleoptera
- Suborder: Polyphaga
- Infraorder: Cucujiformia
- Superfamily: Tenebrionoidea
- Family: Scraptiidae; Mulsant, 1856

Genera
- See text.

= Scraptiidae =

Scraptiidae Temporal range: Eocene–Recent

Family of beetles

The family Scraptiidae is a small group of tenebrionoid beetles sometimes called false flower beetles. There are about 400 species in 30 genera with a world-wide distribution. The adults are found on flowers, sometimes in large numbers, but are also found on foliage. The larvae are typically found under the bark of dead trees. The oldest fossils of the group date to the Eocene.

== Genera ==
Genera include:

- Allopoda
- Anaspis
- Canifa
- Cyrtanaspis
- Diclidia
- Larisia
- Nassipa
- Naucles
- Neoscraptia
- Pectotoma
- Pentaria
- Pseudopentaria
- Scraptia
- Silaria
- Sphingocephalus
- Trotomma
- Trotommidea
