= Mordellistena florissantensis =

Scientific classification
- Domain: Eukaryota
- Kingdom: Animalia
- Phylum: Arthropoda
- Class: Insecta
- Order: Coleoptera
- Suborder: Polyphaga
- Infraorder: Cucujiformia
- Family: Mordellidae
- Genus: Mordellistena
- Species: M. florissantensis

Binomial name
- Mordellistena florissantensis Wickham, 1912

Species of beetle

Mordellistena florissantensis is a beetle in the genus Mordellistena of the family Mordellidae. It was described in 1912 by Wickham.
