= List of Laphria species =

Laphria is a large genus of robber flies found in North America, Europe, and Asia. Species include:

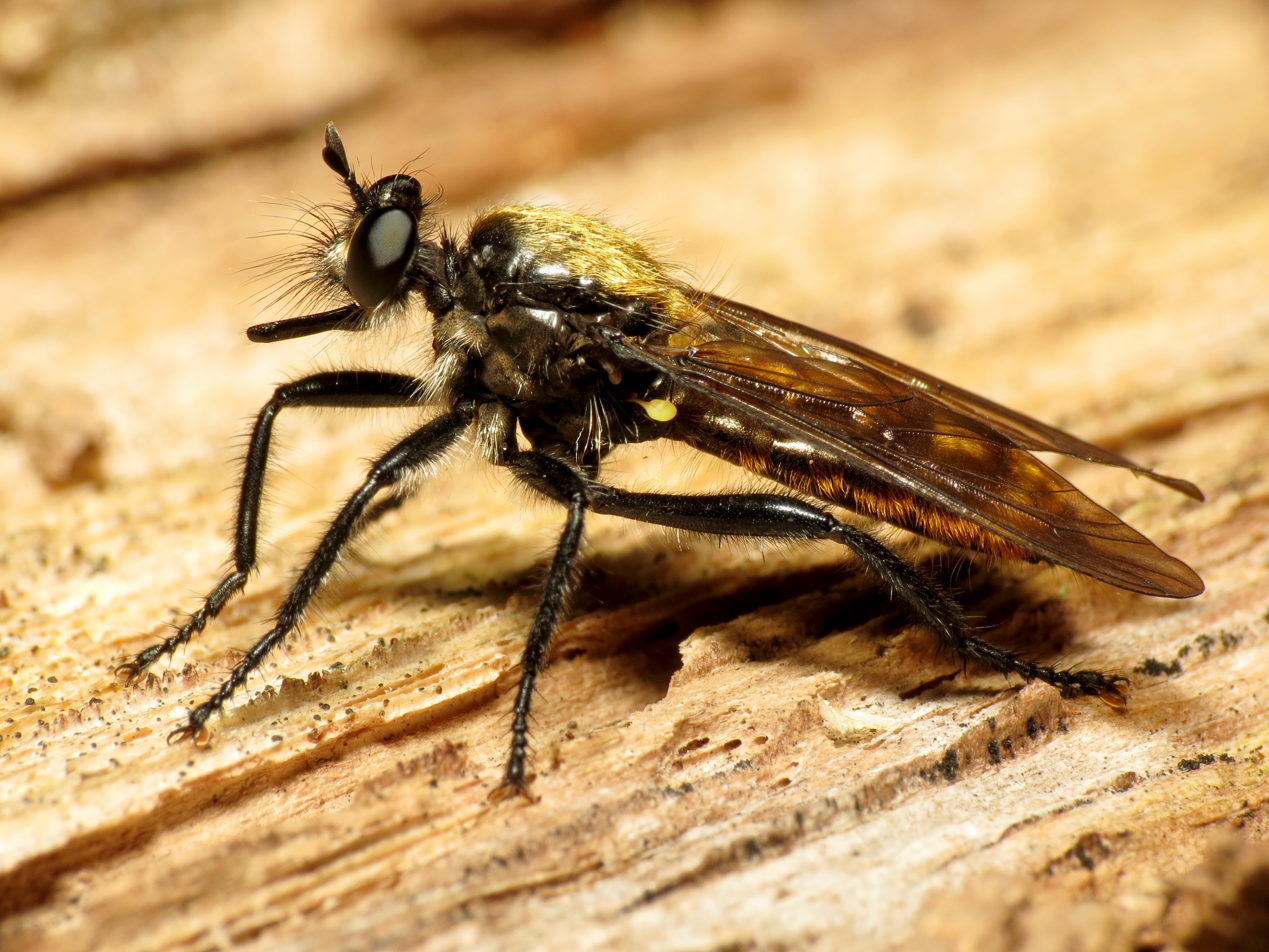
Laphria sp.

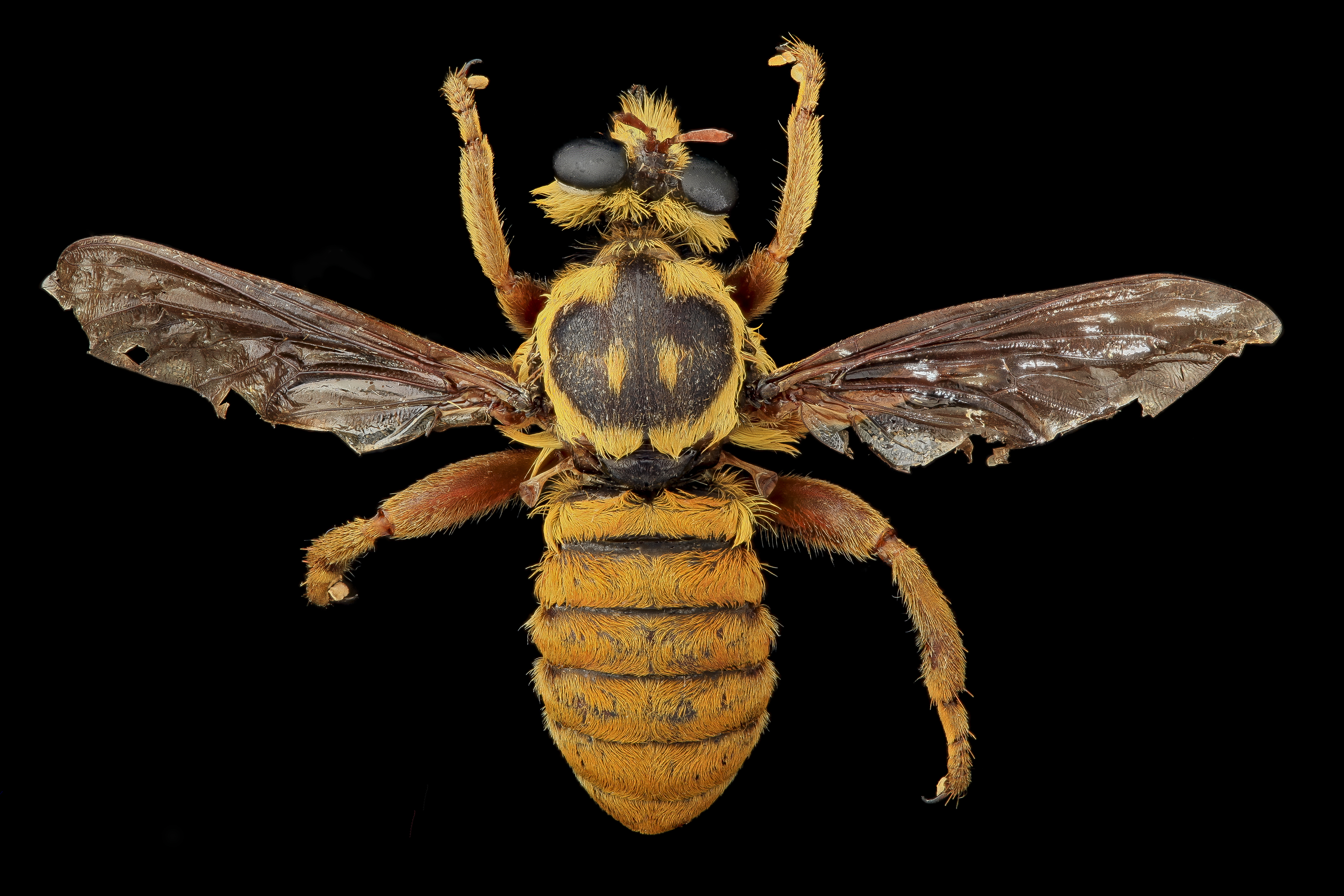
Laphria sp.

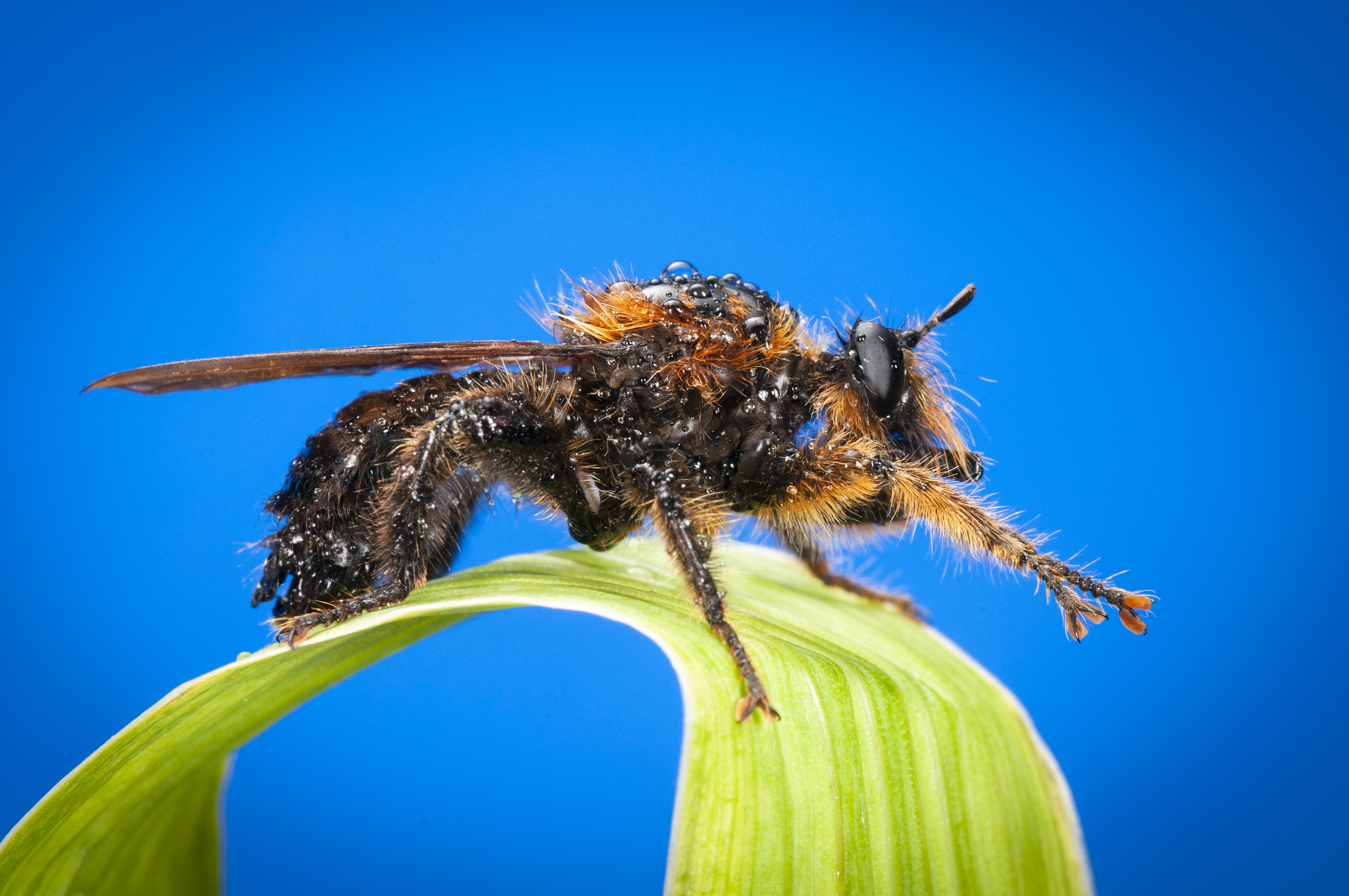
Laphria rufa, Adult, South Korea

- Laphria abdominalis (Walker, 1855)^{c g}
- Laphria aberrans Wulp, 1898^{c g}
- Laphria aeatus Walker, 1849^{i c g}
- Laphria aeneiventris Costa, 1857^{c g}
- Laphria affinis Macquart, 1855^{i c g b}
- Laphria aimatis McAtee, 1919^{i c g}
- Laphria aktis McAtee, 1919^{i c g b}
- Laphria albimaculata Macquart, 1838^{c g}
- Laphria albitibialis Macquart, 1847^{c g}
- Laphria alebas Walker, 1849^{c g}
- Laphria alternans Wiedemann, 1828^{c g}
- Laphria altitudinum Bromley, 1924^{i c g b}
- Laphria amabilis Wulp, 1872^{c g}
- Laphria ampla Walker, 1862^{c g}
- Laphria annulata Gimmerthal, 1834^{c g}
- Laphria annulifemur Enderlein, 1914^{c g}
- Laphria anthrax Meigen, 1804^{c g}
- Laphria aperta Walker, 1858^{c g}
- Laphria apila (Bromley, 1951)^{i c g b}
- Laphria appendiculata Macquart, 1846^{g}
- Laphria argentata (Wiedemann, 1828)
- Laphria argentifera Walker, 1861^{c g}
- Laphria asackeni Wilcox, 1965^{i c g b}
- Laphria assamensis Joseph & Parui, 1981^{c g}
- Laphria astur Osten Sacken, 1877^{i c g b}
- Laphria asturina (Bromley, 1951)^{i c g b}
- Laphria atomentosa Oldroyd, 1960^{c g}
- Laphria aurea (Fabricius, 1794)^{c}
- Laphria aureola Wulp, 1872^{c g}
- Laphria aureopilosa Ricardo, 1900^{c g}
- Laphria aureus (Fabricius, 1794)^{c g}
- Laphria auribasis Walker, 1864^{c g}
- Laphria auricincta Wulp, 1872^{c g}
- Laphria auricomata Hermann, 1914^{c g}
- Laphria auricorpus Hobby, 1948^{c g}
- Laphria aurifera Ricardo, 1925^{c g}
- Laphria auriflua Gerstaecker, 1861^{c g}
- Laphria auroria (Wiedemann, 1828)
- Laphria azurea Hermann, 1914^{c g}
- Laphria bancrofti Ricardo, 1913^{c g}
- Laphria barbicrura Rondani, 1875^{c g}
- Laphria basalis Hermann, 1914^{c g}
- Laphria basigutta Walker, 1857^{c g}
- Laphria bella Loew, 1858^{c g}
- Laphria bellifontanea Villeneuve, 1928^{c g}
- Laphria benardi Villeneuve, 1911^{c g}
- Laphria bengalensis (Wiedemann, 1828)
- Laphria bernsteinii Wulp, 1872^{c g}
- Laphria bifasciata (Olivier, 1789)^{c g}
- Laphria bilykovae Paramonov, 1930^{c g}
- Laphria bimaculata (Walker, 1855)^{c g}
- Laphria bipartita Macquart, 1855^{c g}
- Laphria bipenicillata Bigot, 1891^{c g}
- Laphria bomboides Macquart, 1849^{c g}
- Laphria breonii Macquart, 1838^{c g}
- Laphria burnsi Paramonov, 1958^{c g}
- Laphria calvescenta Baker, 1975^{i c g}
- Laphria canis Williston, 1883^{i c g b}
- Laphria carbonaria (Snow, 1896)^{i c g}
- Laphria carolinensis Schiner, 1867^{i c g}
- Laphria caspica Hermann, 1906^{c g}
- Laphria champlainii (Walton, 1910)^{i c g b}
- Laphria chappuisiana (Enderlein, 1914)^{c g}
- Laphria chrysocephala Meigen, 1820^{c g}
- Laphria chrysonota Hermann, 1914^{c g}
- Laphria chrysorhiza Hermann, 1914^{c g}
- Laphria chrysotelus (Walker, 1855)^{c g}
- Laphria cinerea (Back, 1904)^{i c g b}
- Laphria cingulifera Walker, 1856^{c g}
- Laphria claripennis Bigot, 1878^{c g}
- Laphria coarctata Dufour, 1833^{c g}
- Laphria coerulea Boisduval, 1835^{c g}
- Laphria coerulescens Macquart, 1834^{c g}
- Laphria columbica Walker, 1866^{i c g b}
- Laphria comata White, 1918^{c g}
- Laphria complens Walker, 1859^{c g}
- Laphria completa Walker, 1856^{c g}
- Laphria componens Walker, 1860^{c g}
- Laphria comptissima Walker, 1856^{c g}
- Laphria concludens Walker, 1859^{c g}
- Laphria conopoides (Oldroyd, 1972)^{c g}
- Laphria consistens Curran, 1928^{c g}
- Laphria constricta (Walker, 1855)^{c g}
- Laphria contristans Hobby, 1948^{c g}
- Laphria contusa Wiedmann, 1828^{c g}
- Laphria coquilletti McAtee, 1919^{i}
- Laphria coquillettii McAtee, 1919^{c g b}
- Laphria ctenoventris Oldroyd, 1970^{c g}
- Laphria cyaneogaster Macquart, 1838^{c g}
- Laphria declarata Walker, 1858^{c g}
- Laphria definita Wulp, 1872^{c g}
- Laphria dentipes Fabricius, 1805^{c g}
- Laphria detecta Walker, 1856^{c g}
- Laphria dichroa Wiedemann, 1828^{c g}
- Laphria dimidiata Macquart, 1846^{c g}
- Laphria dimidiatifemur Oldroyd, 1960^{c g}
- Laphria dira (Walker, 1855)^{c g}
- Laphria dispar Coquillett, 1898^{c g}
- Laphria dissimilis Doleschall, 1858^{c g}
- Laphria diversa Wulp, 1881^{c g}
- Laphria divisor (Banks, 1917)^{i c g b}
- Laphria divulsa Walker, 1864^{c g}
- Laphria dizonias Loew, 1847^{c g}
- Laphria dorsalis (De Geer, 1776)^{c g}
- Laphria doryca (Boisduval, 1835)^{c g}
- Laphria egregia Wulp, 1898^{c g}
- Laphria empyrea Gerstaecker, 1861^{c g}
- Laphria engelhardti (Bromley, 1931)^{i c g b}
- Laphria ephippium (Fabricius, 1781)^{c g}
- Laphria falvifacies Macquart, 1850^{c g}
- Laphria fattigi (Bromley, 1951)^{i c g}
- Laphria felis Osten Sacken, 1877^{i c g b}
- Laphria fernaldi (Back, 1904)^{i c g b}
- Laphria ferox Williston, 1883^{i c g b}
- Laphria ferruginosa Wulp, 1872^{c g}
- Laphria flagrantissima Walker, 1858^{c g}
- Laphria flammipennis Walker, 1861^{c g}
- Laphria flava (Linnaeus, 1761)^{c g}
- Laphria flavescens Macquart, 1838^{i c g}
- Laphria flavicollis Say, 1824^{i c g b}
- Laphria flavidorsum Matsumura, 1916^{c g}
- Laphria flavifacies (Macquart, 1849)
- Laphria flavifemorata Macquart, 1850^{c g}
- Laphria flavipes Wiedemann, 1821^{c g}
- Laphria flavipila Macquart, 1834^{i c g}
- Laphria formosana Matsumura, 1916^{c g}
- Laphria fortipes Walker, 1857^{c g}
- Laphria franciscana Bigot, 1878^{i c g b}
- Laphria frommeri Joseph & Parui, 1981^{c g}
- Laphria fulvicrura Rondani, 1875^{c g}
- Laphria fulvipes Ricardo, 1913^{c g}
- Laphria fulvithorax Fabricius, 1805^{c g}
- Laphria furva Wulp, 1898^{c g}
- Laphria fuscata (Joseph & Parui, 1997)
- Laphria futilis Wulp, 1872^{c g}
- Laphria galathei Costa, 1857^{c g}
- Laphria georgina Wiedemann, 1821^{i c g}
- Laphria gibbosa (Linnaeus, 1758)^{c g}
- Laphria gigas Macquart, 1838^{c g}
- Laphria gilva (Linnaeus, 1758)^{i c g b}
- Laphria gilvoides Wulp, 1898^{c g}
- Laphria glauca Enderlein, 1914^{c g}
- Laphria gravipes Wulp, 1872^{c g}
- Laphria grossa (Fabricius, 1775)^{i c g b}
- Laphria hakiensis Matsumura, 1916^{c g}
- Laphria hecate Gerstaecker, 1861^{c g}
- Laphria hera Bromley, 1935^{c g}
- Laphria hermanni Meijere, 1924^{c g}
- Laphria hirta Ricardo, 1913^{c g}
- Laphria hirticornis Guerin-Meneville, 1835^{c g}
- Laphria histrionica Wulp, 1872^{c g}
- Laphria hobelias (Oldroyd, 1972)^{c g}
- Laphria horrida (Walker, 1855)^{c g}
- Laphria howeana Paramonov, 1958^{c g}
- Laphria hradskyi Young, 2008^{c g}
- Laphria huron (Bromley, 1929)^{i c g b}
- Laphria ignobilis Wulp, 1872^{c g}
- Laphria imbellis Walker, 1857^{c g}
- Laphria inaurea Walker, 1857^{c g}
- Laphria incivilis Walker, 1856^{c g}
- Laphria index McAtee, 1919^{i c g b}
- Laphria indica Joseph & Parui, 1981^{c g}
- Laphria insignis (Banks, 1917)^{i c g b}
- Laphria interrupta Walker, 1856^{c g}
- Laphria iola Bromley, 1935^{c g}
- Laphria ithypyga McAtee, 1919^{i c g b}
- Laphria ivorina Oldroyd, 1968^{c g}
- Laphria janus McAtee, 1919^{i c g b}
- Laphria javana Macquart, 1834^{c g}
- Laphria justa Walker, 1858^{c g}
- Laphria karafutonis Matsumura, 1916^{c g}
- Laphria keralaensis Joseph & Parui, 1981^{c g}
- Laphria kistjakovskiji Paramonov, 1929^{c g}
- Laphria lasipes Wiedemann, 1828^{i c g}
- Laphria lata Macquart, 1850^{i c g b}
- Laphria lateralis Fabricius, 1805^{c g}
- Laphria laterepunctata Macquart, 1838^{c g}
- Laphria lepida Walker, 1856^{c g}
- Laphria leptogaster Perty, 1833^{c g}
- Laphria leucocephala Meigen, 1804^{c g}
- Laphria leucoprocta Wiedemann, 1828^{c g}
- Laphria limbinervis Strobl, 1898^{c g}
- Laphria lobifera Hermann, 1914^{c g}
- Laphria luctuosa Macquart, 1847^{c g}
- Laphria lukinsi Paramonov, 1958^{c g}
- Laphria luteipennis (Macquart, 1848)^{c g}
- Laphria luteopilosa Joseph & Parui, 1981^{c g}
- Laphria macquarti (Banks, 1917)^{i c g b}
- Laphria macra Bigot, 1859^{c g}
- Laphria manifesta Walker, 1858^{c g}
- Laphria marginalis Williston, 1901^{c g}
- Laphria maynei Janssens, 1953^{c g}
- Laphria melania Bigot, 1878^{c g}
- Laphria melanogaster Wiedemann, 1821^{i c g}
- Laphria mellipes Wiedemann, 1828^{c g}
- Laphria meridionalis Mulsant, 1860^{c g}
- Laphria metalli Walker, 1851^{c g}
- Laphria milvina Bromley, 1929^{i c g}
- Laphria mitsukurii Coquillett, 1898^{c g}
- Laphria motodomariensis Matsumura, 1916^{c g}
- Laphria mulleri Wulp, 1872^{c g}
- Laphria multipunctata Oldroyd, 1974^{c g}
- Laphria nathani Joseph & Parui, 1981^{c g}
- Laphria nigella (Bromley, 1934)^{i c g}
- Laphria nigrescens Ricardo, 1925^{c g}
- Laphria nigribimba Bromley, 1935^{c g}
- Laphria nigripennis Meigen, 1820^{c g}
- Laphria nigripes Paramonov, 1929^{c g}
- Laphria nigrohirsuta Lichtwardt, 1809^{c g}
- Laphria nitidula (Fabricius, 1794)^{c g}
- Laphria notabilis Walker, 1857^{c g}
- Laphria nusoides Bromley, 1931^{c g}
- Laphria ogasawarensis Matsumura, 1916^{c g}
- Laphria ogumae Matsumura, 1911^{c g}
- Laphria okinawensis (Matsumura, 1916)
- Laphria orcus Walker, 1857^{c g}
- Laphria orientalis Joseph & Parui, 1981^{c g}
- Laphria ostensa Walker, 1862^{c g}
- Laphria pacifera (Paramonov, 1958)
- Laphria pacifica Paramonov, 1958^{c g}
- Laphria partitor (Banks, 1917)^{i c g b}
- Laphria peristalsis (Oldroyd, 1972)^{c g}
- Laphria pernigra Wulp, 1872^{c g}
- Laphria philippinensis Enderlein, 1914^{c g}
- Laphria pilipes Macquart, 1834^{c g}
- Laphria plana Walker, 1857^{c g}
- Laphria posticata Say, 1824^{i c g b}
- Laphria praelusia Séguy, 1930^{c g}
- Laphria proxima (Walker, 1855)^{c g}
- Laphria puer Doleschall, 1858^{c g}
- Laphria pusilla Wiedemann, 1828^{c g}
- Laphria pyrrhothrix Hermann, 1914^{c g}
- Laphria radicalis Walker, 1857^{c g}
- Laphria rapax Osten Sacken, 1877^{i c g}
- Laphria reginae Paramonov, 1958^{c g}
- Laphria reinwardtii Wiedemann, 1828^{c g}
- Laphria remota Hermann, 1914^{c g}
- Laphria remoto Hermann, 1914^{g}
- Laphria ricardoi Bromley, 1935^{c g}
- Laphria royalensis (Bromley, 1950)^{i c g}
- Laphria rubescens Bigot, 1878^{c g}
- Laphria rubidofasciata Wulp, 1872^{c g}
- Laphria rudis Walker, 1856^{c g}
- Laphria rueppelii (Wiedemann, 1828)^{c g}
- Laphria rufa Roder, 1887^{c g}

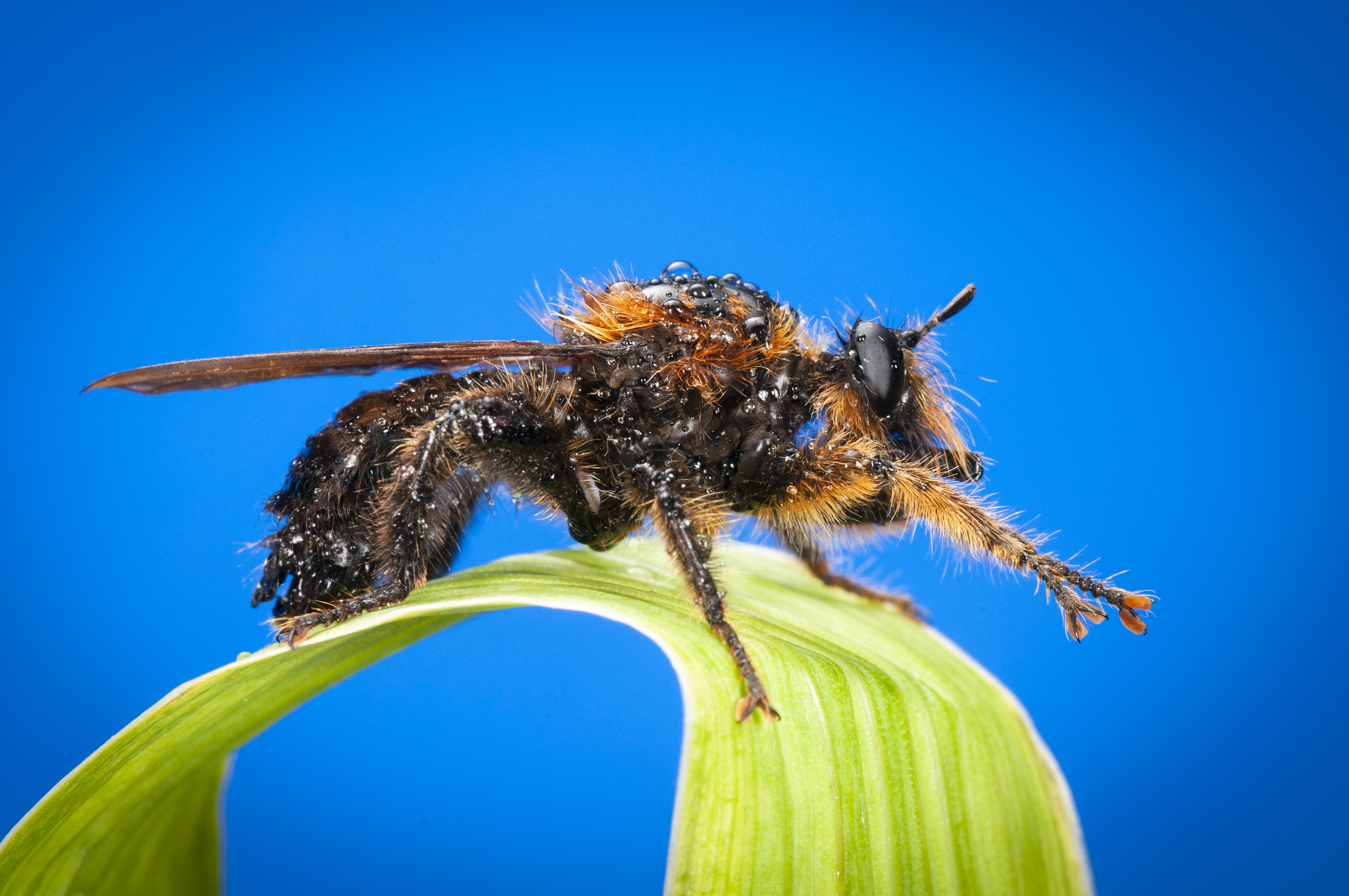
Laphria rufa, Adult, from South Korea

- Laphria ruficauda Williston, 1885^{c g}
- Laphria rufifemorata Macquart, 1846^{c g}
- Laphria rufitibia Oldroyd, 1960^{c g}
- Laphria sackeni (Banks, 1917)^{c g b}
- Laphria sacrator Walker, 1849^{i c g b}
- Laphria sadales Walker, 1849^{i c g b}
- Laphria saffrana Fabricius, 1805^{i c g b}
- Laphria sapporensis Matsumura, 1911^{c g}
- Laphria schoutedeni Bromley, 1935^{c g}
- Laphria scorpio McAtee, 1919^{i c g b}
- Laphria scutellata Macquart, 1835^{c g}
- Laphria semifulva Bigot, 1878^{c g}
- Laphria semitecta (Coquillett, 1910)^{i c g}
- Laphria sericea Say, 1823^{i c g b}
- Laphria serpentina Bezzi, 1908^{c g}
- Laphria seticrura Rondani, 1875^{c g}
- Laphria sibirica Lehr, 1989^{c g}
- Laphria sicula McAtee, 1919^{i c g b}
- Laphria signatipes Wulp, 1872^{c g}
- Laphria sobria Walker, 1857^{c g}
- Laphria solita Wulp, 1872^{c g}
- Laphria soror Wulp, 1872^{c g}
- Laphria stuckenbergi Oldroyd, 1960^{c g}
- Laphria submetallica Macquart, 1838^{c g}
- Laphria taipinensis (Matsumura, 1916)
- Laphria taphia Walker, 1849^{c g}
- Laphria taphius Walker, 1849^{c}
- Laphria telecles Walker, 1849^{c g}
- Laphria terminalis Wulp, 1872^{c g}
- Laphria terraenovae Macquart, 1838^{i c g}
- Laphria thoracica Fabricius, 1805^{i c g b}
- Laphria tibialis Meigen, 1820^{c g}
- Laphria transatlantica Schiner, 1868^{c g}
- Laphria triangularis (Walker, 1855)^{c g}
- Laphria tricolor Wulp, 1872^{c g}
- Laphria triligata Walker, 1861^{c g}
- Laphria tristis Doleschall, 1857^{c g}
- Laphria trux McAtee, 1919^{i c g b}
- Laphria unicolor (Williston, 1883)^{i c g b}
- Laphria unifascia Walker, 1856^{c g}
- Laphria valparaiensis (Joseph & Parui, 1997)
- Laphria varia Loew, 1865^{c g}
- Laphria variana White, 1918^{c g}
- Laphria varipes Bigot, 1878^{c g}
- Laphria venatrix Loew, 1847^{c g}
- Laphria venezuelensis Macquart, 1846^{c g}
- Laphria ventralis Williston, 1885^{i c g b}
- Laphria violacea Macquart, 1846^{c g}
- Laphria virginica (Banks, 1917)^{i c g b}
- Laphria vivax Williston, 1883^{i c g}
- Laphria vorax (Bromley, 1929)^{i c g b}
- Laphria vulcana Wiedemann, 1828^{c}
- Laphria vulcanus Wiedemann, 1828^{c g}
- Laphria vulpina Meigen, 1820^{c g}
- Laphria vultur Osten Sacken, 1877^{i c g b}
- Laphria walkeri Enderlein, 1914^{c g}
- Laphria willistoniana Enderlein, 1914^{c g}
- Laphria winnemana McAtee, 1919^{i c g b}
- Laphria xanthothrix Hermann, 1914^{c g}
- Laphria yamatonis Matsumura, 1916^{c g}

Data sources: i = ITIS, c = Catalogue of Life, g = GBIF, b = Bugguide.net
