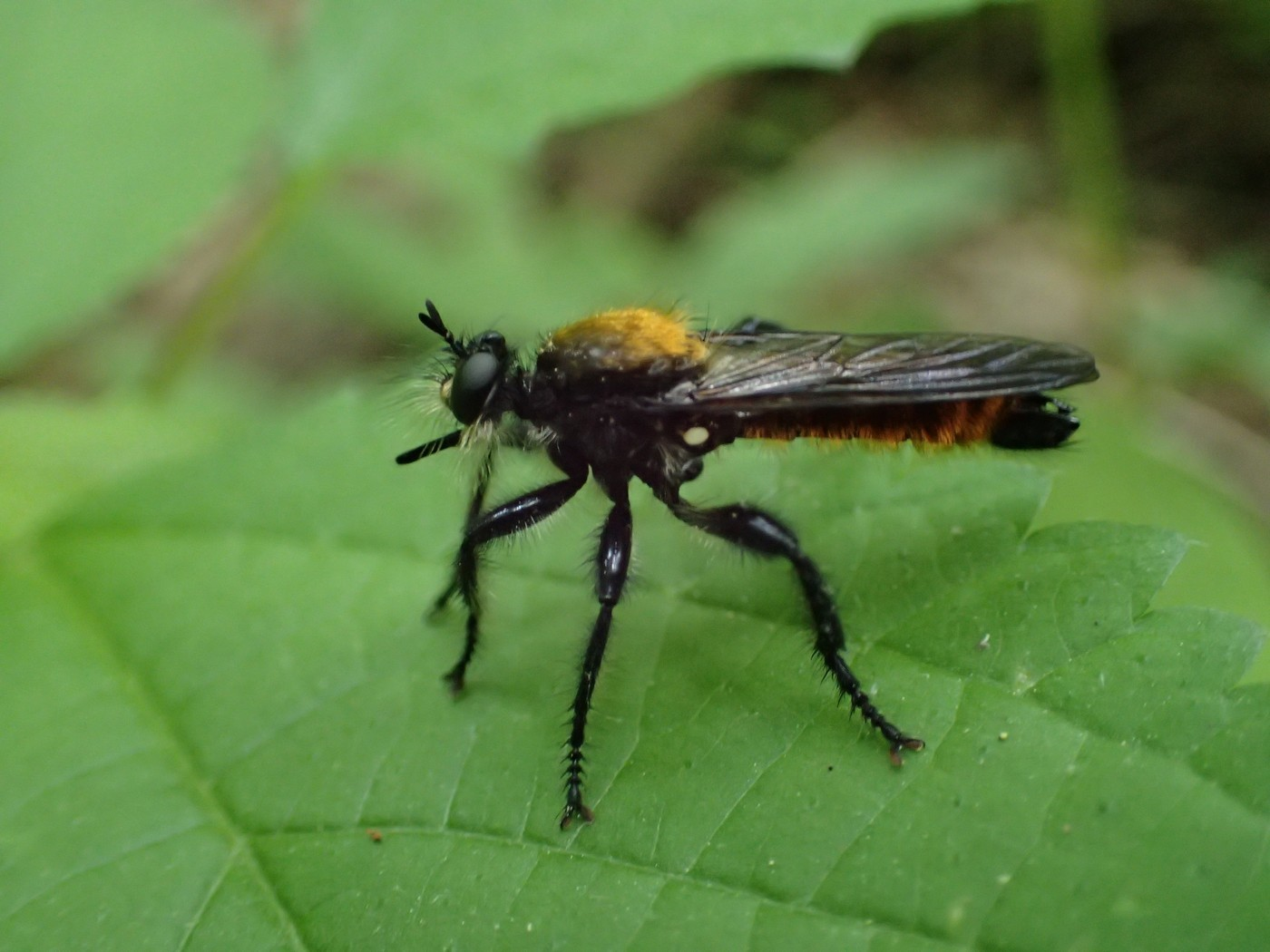

Scientific classification
- Kingdom: Animalia
- Phylum: Arthropoda
- Clade: Pancrustacea
- Class: Insecta
- Order: Diptera
- Family: Asilidae
- Genus: Laphria
- Species: L. sericea

Binomial name
- Laphria sericea Say, 1823

= Laphria sericea =

Species of fly

Laphria sericea is a species of robber fly in the family Asilidae.
