= Laphria ferox =

Scientific classification
- Domain: Eukaryota
- Kingdom: Animalia
- Phylum: Arthropoda
- Class: Insecta
- Order: Diptera
- Family: Asilidae
- Genus: Laphria
- Species: L. ferox

Binomial name
- Laphria ferox Williston, 1883

Species of fly

Laphria ferox is a robber fly in the genus Laphria ("bee-like robber flies"), in the order Diptera ("flies").
