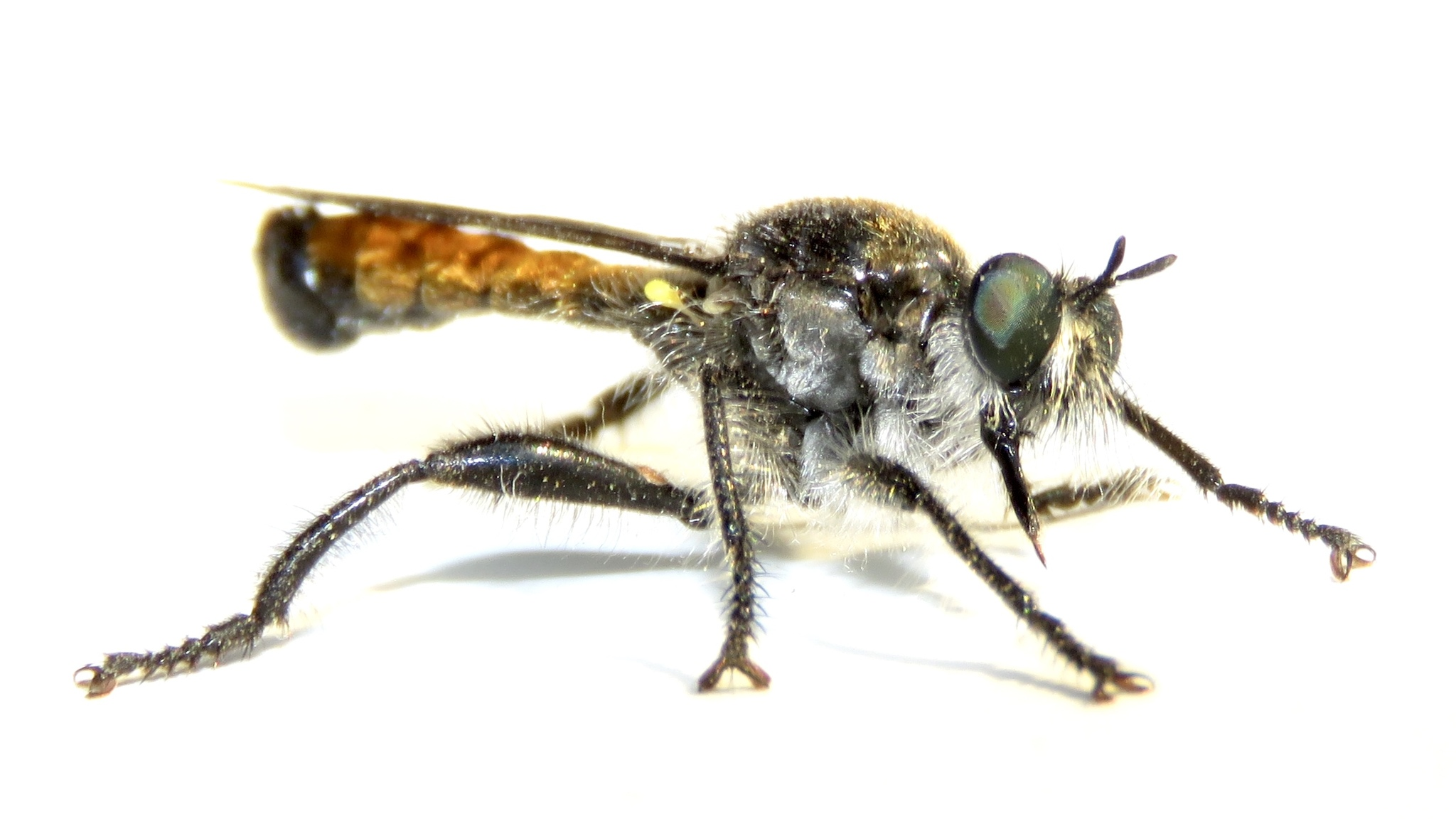

Scientific classification
- Domain: Eukaryota
- Kingdom: Animalia
- Phylum: Arthropoda
- Class: Insecta
- Order: Diptera
- Family: Asilidae
- Genus: Laphria
- Species: L. index

Binomial name
- Laphria index Mcatee, 1919

= Laphria index =

Species of fly

Laphria index is a species of robber flies in the family Asilidae.
