= Laphria vorax =

Scientific classification
- Domain: Eukaryota
- Kingdom: Animalia
- Phylum: Arthropoda
- Class: Insecta
- Order: Diptera
- Family: Asilidae
- Genus: Laphria
- Species: L. vorax

Binomial name
- Laphria vorax (Bromley, 1929)

Synonyms
- Bombomima vorax Bromley, 1929

Species of fly

Laphria vorax is a species of robber flies in the family Asilidae.
