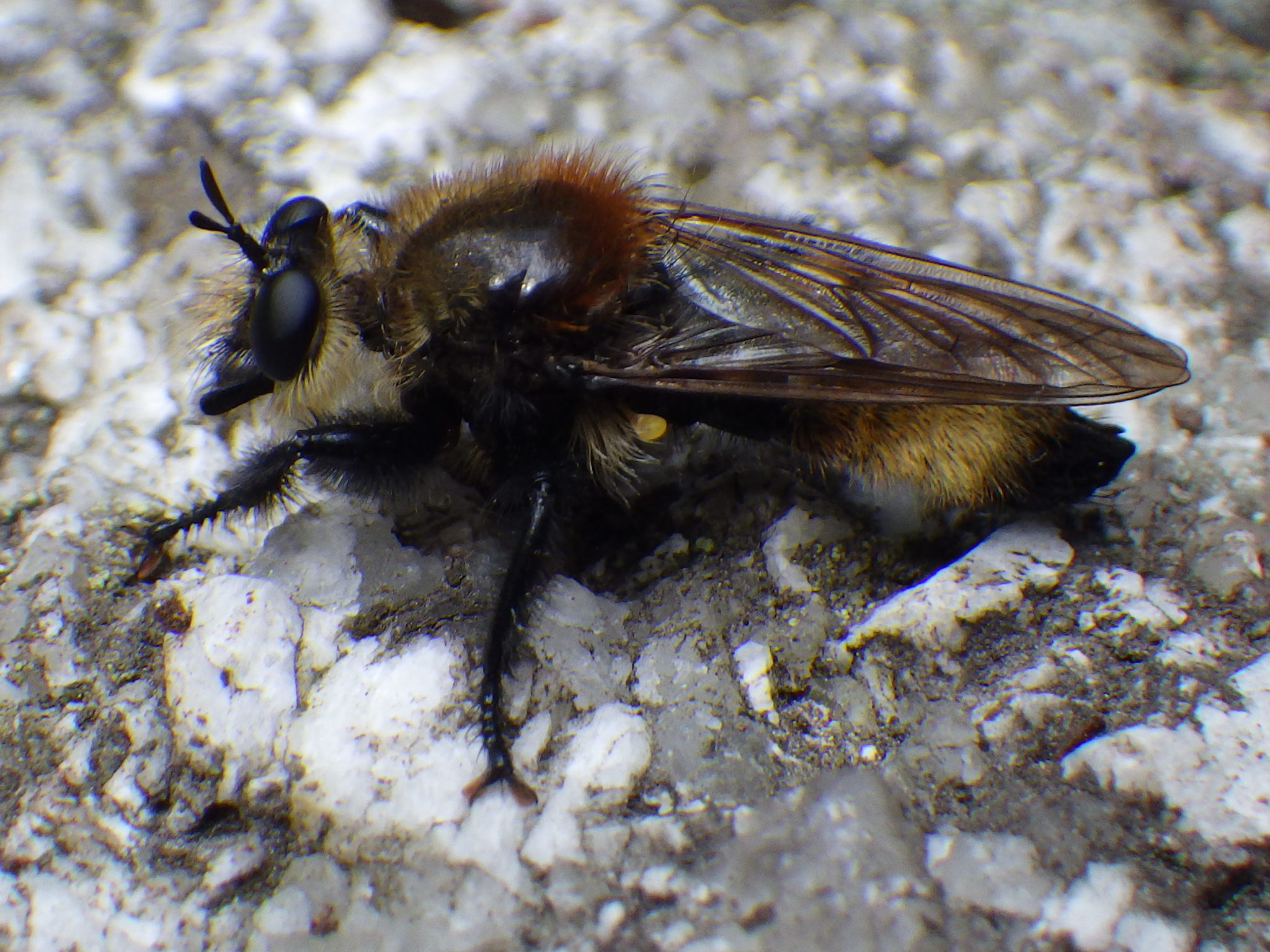

Scientific classification
- Domain: Eukaryota
- Kingdom: Animalia
- Phylum: Arthropoda
- Class: Insecta
- Order: Diptera
- Family: Asilidae
- Genus: Laphria
- Species: L. insignis

Binomial name
- Laphria insignis (Banks, 1917)

Synonyms
- Dasyllis insignis Banks, 1917=

= Laphria insignis =

Species of fly

Laphria insignis is a species of robber fly in the family Asilidae.
