= Laphria cinerea =

Scientific classification
- Domain: Eukaryota
- Kingdom: Animalia
- Phylum: Arthropoda
- Class: Insecta
- Order: Diptera
- Family: Asilidae
- Genus: Laphria
- Species: L. cinerea

Binomial name
- Laphria cinerea (Back, 1904)

Synonyms
- Dasyllis cinerea Back, 1904

Species of fly

Laphria cinerea is a species of robber flies in the family Asilidae.
