= Laphria champlainii =

Scientific classification
- Domain: Eukaryota
- Kingdom: Animalia
- Phylum: Arthropoda
- Class: Insecta
- Order: Diptera
- Family: Asilidae
- Genus: Laphria
- Species: L. champlainii

Binomial name
- Laphria champlainii (Walton, 1910)

Synonyms
- Dasyllis champlainii Walton, 1910

Species of fly

Laphria champlainii is a species of robber flies in the family Asilidae.
