= Laphria partitor =

Scientific classification
- Domain: Eukaryota
- Kingdom: Animalia
- Phylum: Arthropoda
- Class: Insecta
- Order: Diptera
- Family: Asilidae
- Genus: Laphria
- Species: L. partitor

Binomial name
- Laphria partitor (Banks, 1917)

Synonyms
- Dasyllis partitor Banks, 1917

Species of fly

Laphria partitor is a species of robber flies in the family Asilidae.
