= Laphria unicolor =

Scientific classification
- Domain: Eukaryota
- Kingdom: Animalia
- Phylum: Arthropoda
- Class: Insecta
- Order: Diptera
- Family: Asilidae
- Genus: Laphria
- Species: L. unicolor

Binomial name
- Laphria unicolor (Williston, 1883)

Synonyms
- Dasyllis unicolor Williston, 1883

Species of fly

Laphria unicolor is a species of robber flies in the family Asilidae.
