= Laphria engelhardti =

Scientific classification
- Domain: Eukaryota
- Kingdom: Animalia
- Phylum: Arthropoda
- Class: Insecta
- Order: Diptera
- Family: Asilidae
- Genus: Laphria
- Species: L. engelhardti

Binomial name
- Laphria engelhardti (Bromley, 1931)

Synonyms
- Bombomima engelhardti Bromley, 1931

Species of fly

Laphria engelhardti is a species of robber flies in the family Asilidae.
