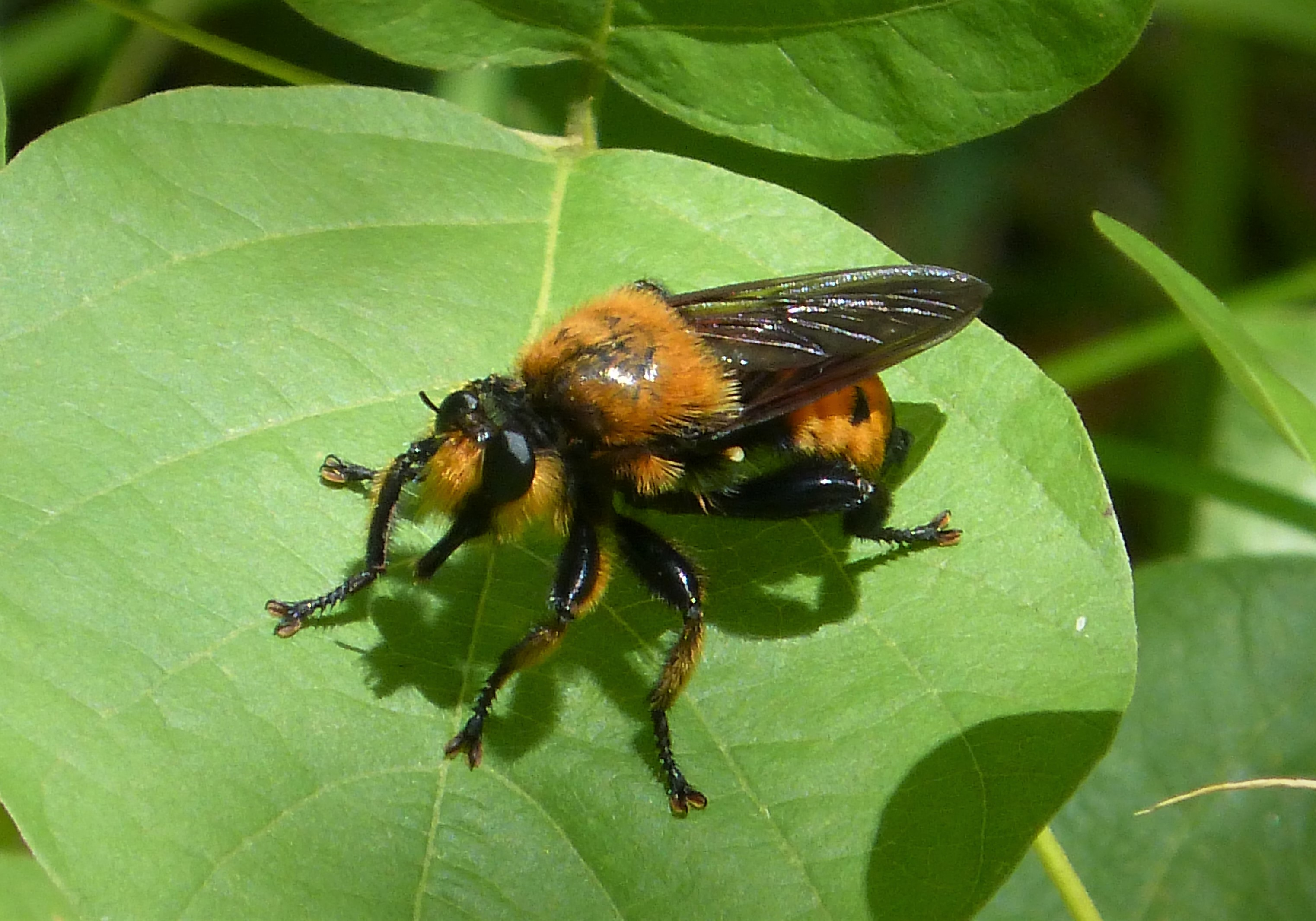

Scientific classification
- Kingdom: Animalia
- Phylum: Arthropoda
- Class: Insecta
- Order: Diptera
- Family: Asilidae
- Genus: Laphria
- Species: L. grossa

Binomial name
- Laphria grossa (Fabricius, 1775)

Synonyms
- Asilus grossus Fabricius, 1775; Laphria analis Macquart, 1838; Laphria flavibarbis Harris, 1862; Laphria tergissa Say, 1823

= Laphria grossa =

Species of fly

Laphria grossa, the giant laphria, is a species of robber flies in the family Asilidae.
