= Laphria franciscana =

Scientific classification
- Kingdom: Animalia
- Phylum: Arthropoda
- Class: Insecta
- Order: Diptera
- Family: Asilidae
- Genus: Laphria
- Species: L. franciscana

Binomial name
- Laphria franciscana Bigot, 1878

Species of fly

Laphria franciscana is a species of robber flies in the family Asilidae. It is found in northeastern North America, including southern Ontario, Manitoba, Quebec, Nova Scotia and Maine, with its southernmost distribution being in Texas and Florida.
