= Laphria columbica =

Scientific classification
- Kingdom: Animalia
- Phylum: Arthropoda
- Class: Insecta
- Order: Diptera
- Family: Asilidae
- Genus: Laphria
- Species: L. columbica

Binomial name
- Laphria columbica Walker, 1866

Species of fly

Laphria columbica is a species of robber flies in the family Asilidae.
