= Laphria asackeni =

Scientific classification
- Domain: Eukaryota
- Kingdom: Animalia
- Phylum: Arthropoda
- Class: Insecta
- Order: Diptera
- Family: Asilidae
- Genus: Laphria
- Species: L. asackeni

Binomial name
- Laphria asackeni Wilcox, 1965

Synonyms
- Laphria sackeni Wilcox, 1936

Species of fly

Laphria asackeni is a species of robber flies in the family Asilidae.
