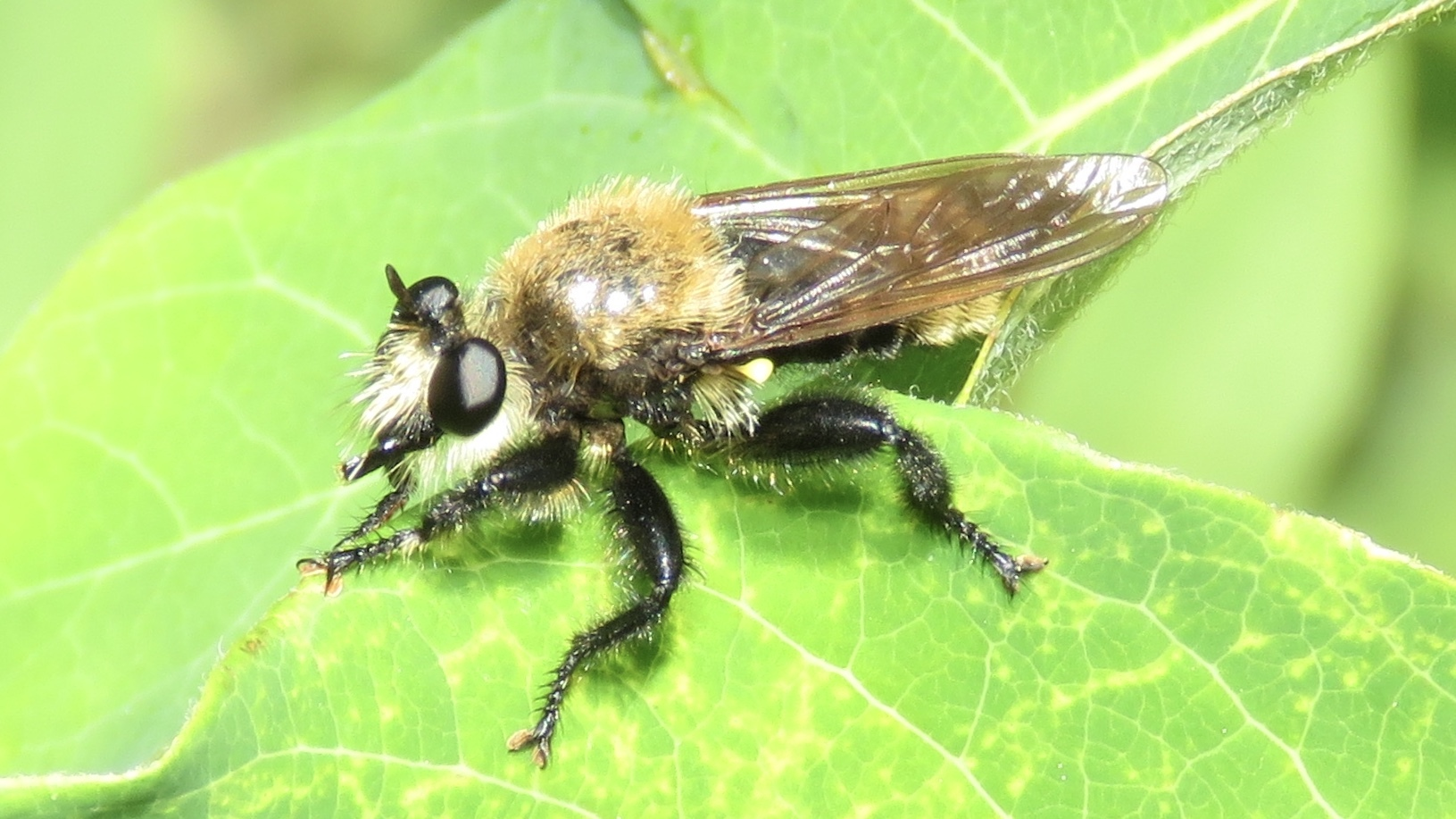

Scientific classification
- Domain: Eukaryota
- Kingdom: Animalia
- Phylum: Arthropoda
- Class: Insecta
- Order: Diptera
- Family: Asilidae
- Genus: Laphria
- Species: L. posticata

Binomial name
- Laphria posticata Say, 1824

Synonyms
- Bombomima brunnea Bromley, 1929; Bombomima scutellaris Bromley, 1929

= Laphria posticata =

Species of fly

Laphria posticata is a species of robber flies in the family Asilidae.
