= Laphria janus =

Scientific classification
- Domain: Eukaryota
- Kingdom: Animalia
- Phylum: Arthropoda
- Class: Insecta
- Order: Diptera
- Family: Asilidae
- Genus: Laphria
- Species: L. janus

Binomial name
- Laphria janus Mcatee, 1919

Species of fly

Laphria janus is a species of robber flies in the family Asilidae.
