= Laphria huron =

Scientific classification
- Kingdom: Animalia
- Phylum: Arthropoda
- Class: Insecta
- Order: Diptera
- Family: Asilidae
- Genus: Laphria
- Species: L. huron

Binomial name
- Laphria huron (Bromley, 1929)

Synonyms
- Bombomima huron Bromley, 1929

Species of fly

Laphria huron is a species of robber flies in the family Asilidae.
