= Laphria asturina =

Scientific classification
- Domain: Eukaryota
- Kingdom: Animalia
- Phylum: Arthropoda
- Class: Insecta
- Order: Diptera
- Family: Asilidae
- Genus: Laphria
- Species: L. asturina

Binomial name
- Laphria asturina (Bromley, 1951)

Synonyms
- Bombomima asturina Bromley, 1951

Species of fly

Laphria asturina is a species of robber flies in the family Asilidae.
