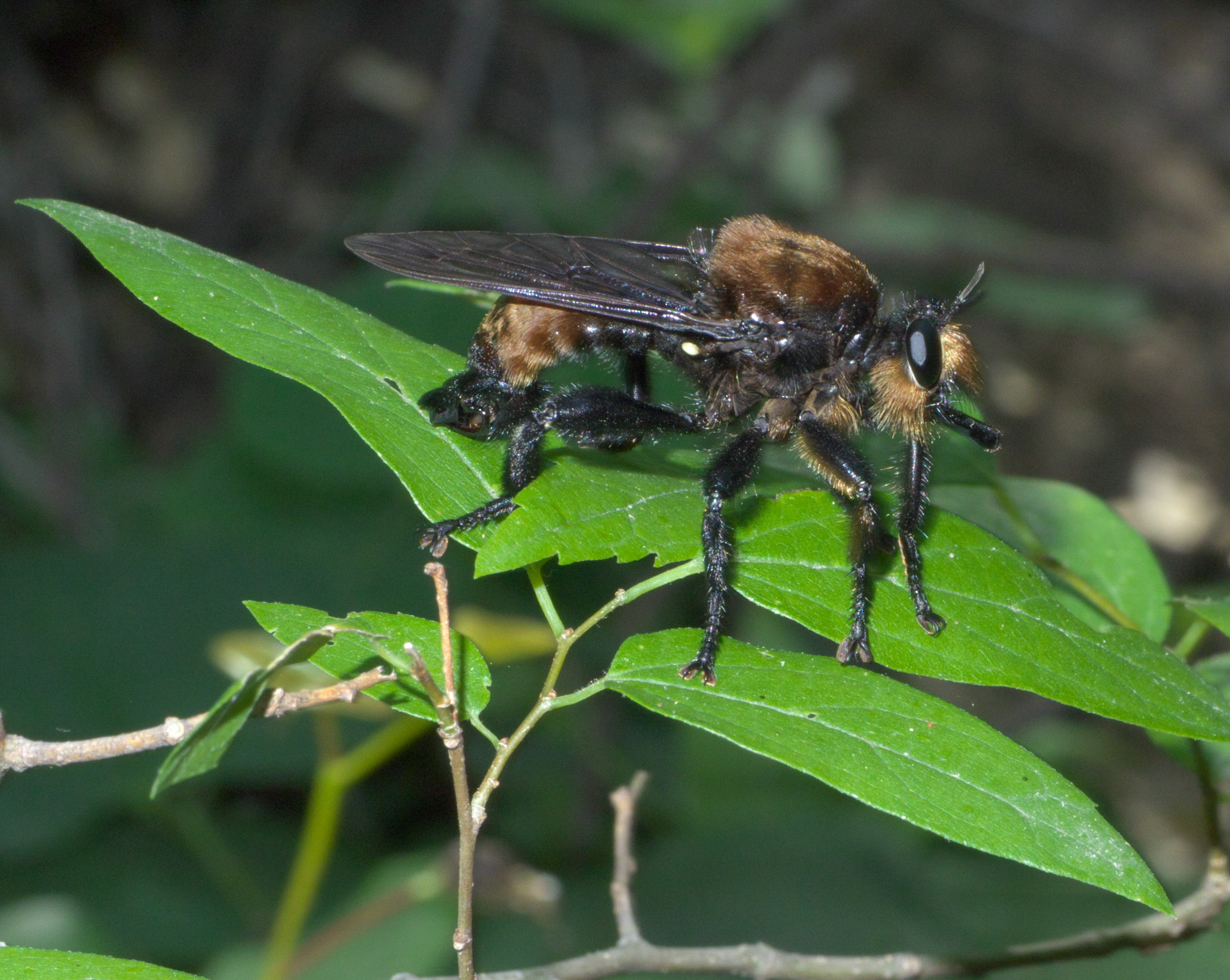

Scientific classification
- Domain: Eukaryota
- Kingdom: Animalia
- Phylum: Arthropoda
- Class: Insecta
- Order: Diptera
- Family: Asilidae
- Genus: Laphria
- Species: L. lata

Binomial name
- Laphria lata Macquart, 1850

Synonyms
- Mallophora analis Macquart, 1846

= Laphria lata =

Species of fly

Laphria lata is a species of robber flies in the family Asilidae.

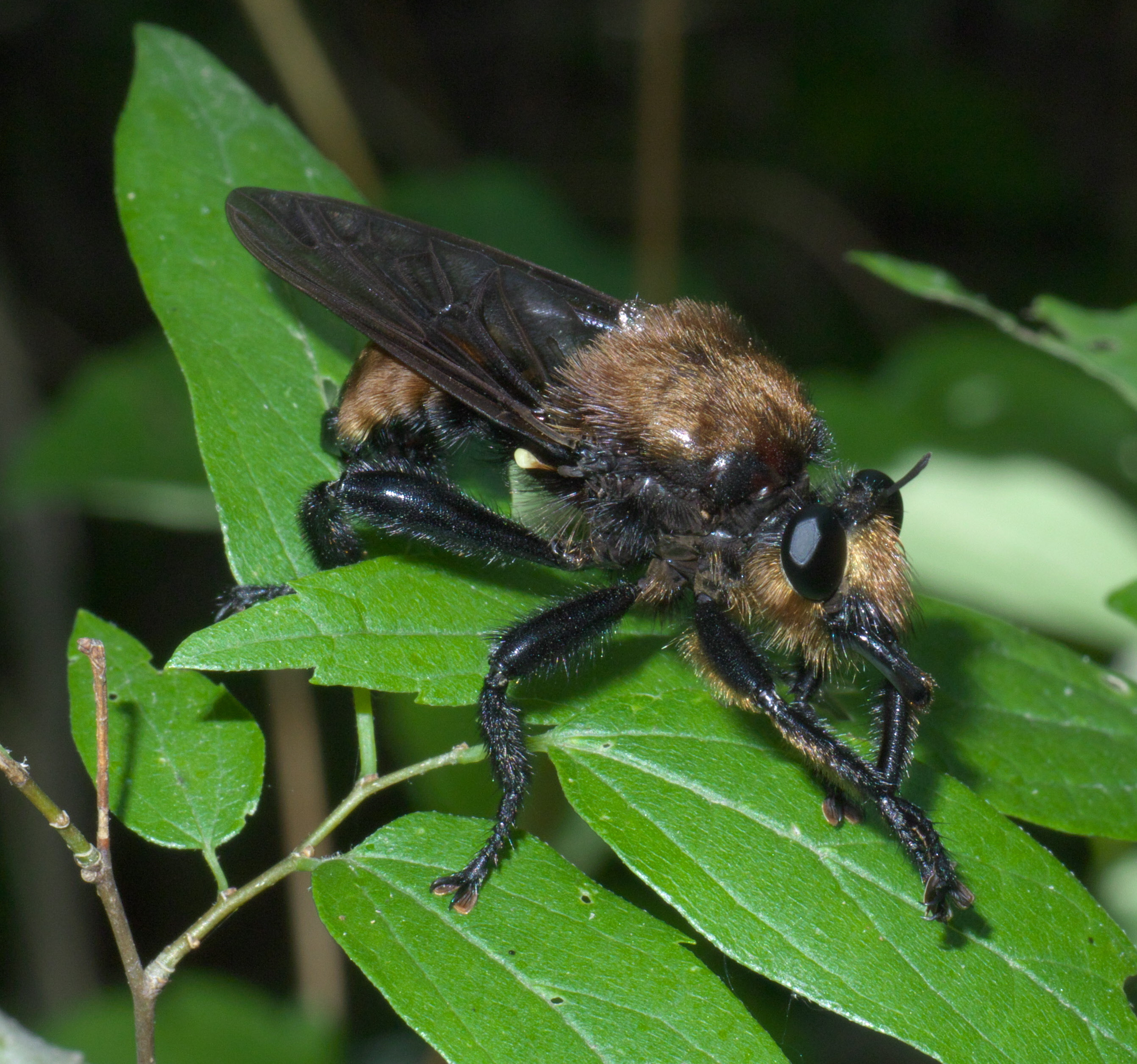

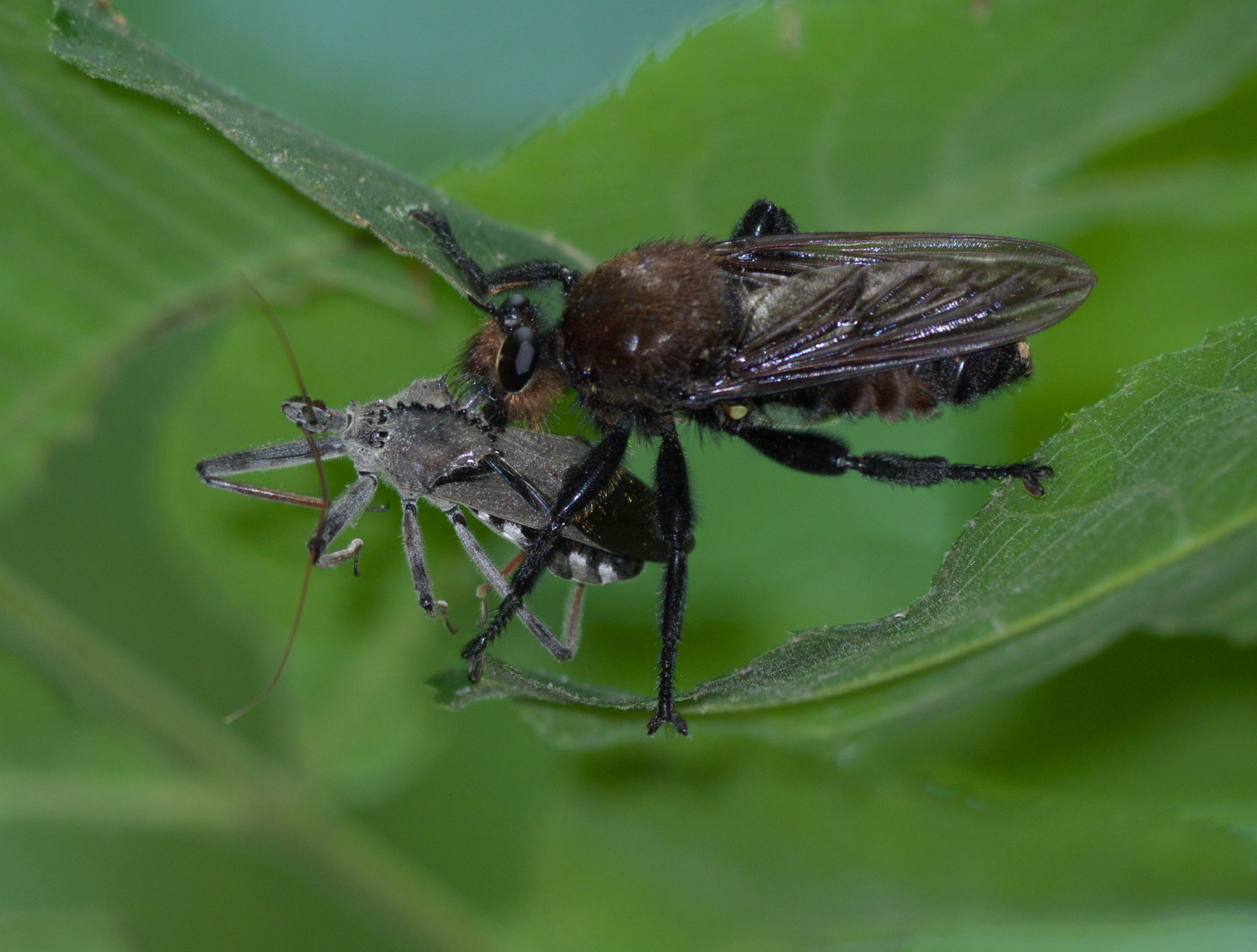
