= Laphria virginica =

Scientific classification
- Domain: Eukaryota
- Kingdom: Animalia
- Phylum: Arthropoda
- Class: Insecta
- Order: Diptera
- Family: Asilidae
- Genus: Laphria
- Species: L. virginica

Binomial name
- Laphria virginica (Banks, 1917)

Synonyms
- Dasyllis virginica Banks, 1917

Species of fly

Laphria virginica is a species of robber flies in the genus Laphria ("bee-like robber flies"), in the order Diptera ("flies").
