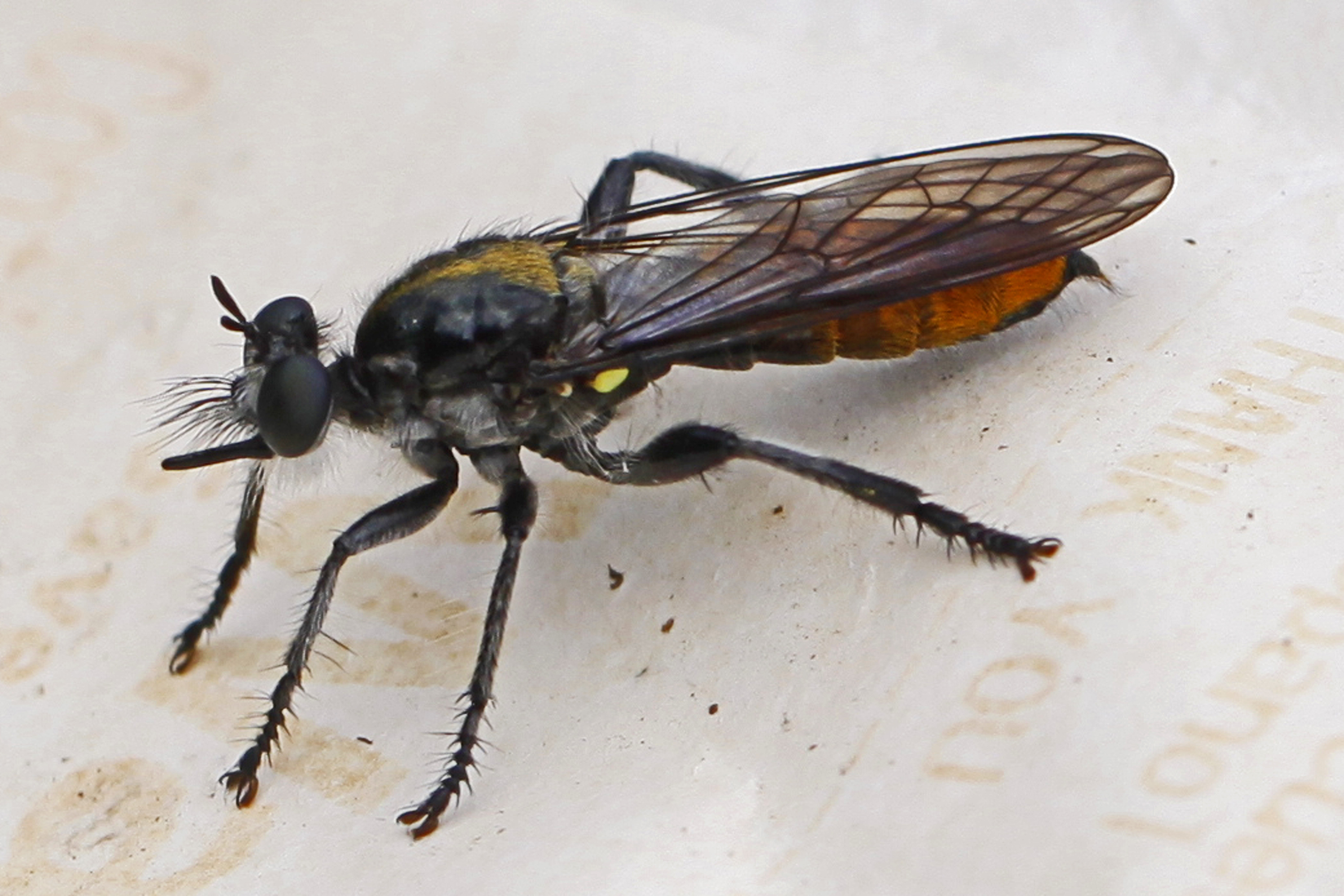

Scientific classification
- Domain: Eukaryota
- Kingdom: Animalia
- Phylum: Arthropoda
- Class: Insecta
- Order: Diptera
- Family: Asilidae
- Genus: Laphria
- Species: L. ithypyga

Binomial name
- Laphria ithypyga Mcatee, 1919

= Laphria ithypyga =

Species of fly

Laphria ithypyga is a species of robber flies in the family Asilidae. It is found in the United States.
