= Laphria gilva =

Scientific classification
- Kingdom: Animalia
- Phylum: Arthropoda
- Class: Insecta
- Order: Diptera
- Family: Asilidae
- Genus: Laphria
- Species: L. gilva

Binomial name
- Laphria gilva (Linnaeus, 1758)

Synonyms
- Asilus gilvus Linnaeus, 1758; Laphria bilineata Walker, 1849

Species of fly

Laphria gilva is a species of robber fly in the family Asilidae. It is found in the Nearctic realm. The species mates on pine trees or stumps, with both sexes being polygamous.
