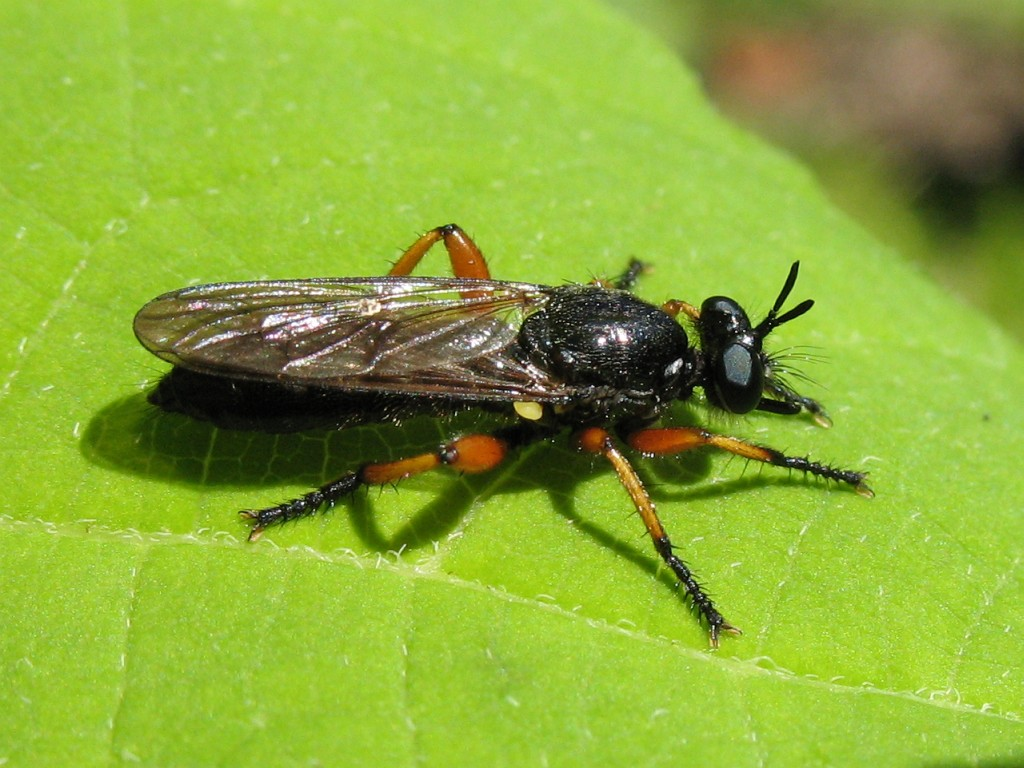

Scientific classification
- Kingdom: Animalia
- Phylum: Arthropoda
- Class: Insecta
- Order: Diptera
- Family: Asilidae
- Genus: Laphria
- Species: L. sadales

Binomial name
- Laphria sadales Walker, 1849

Synonyms
- Laphria pubescens Williston, 1883

= Laphria sadales =

Species of fly

Laphria sadales is a species of robber flies in the family Asilidae.
