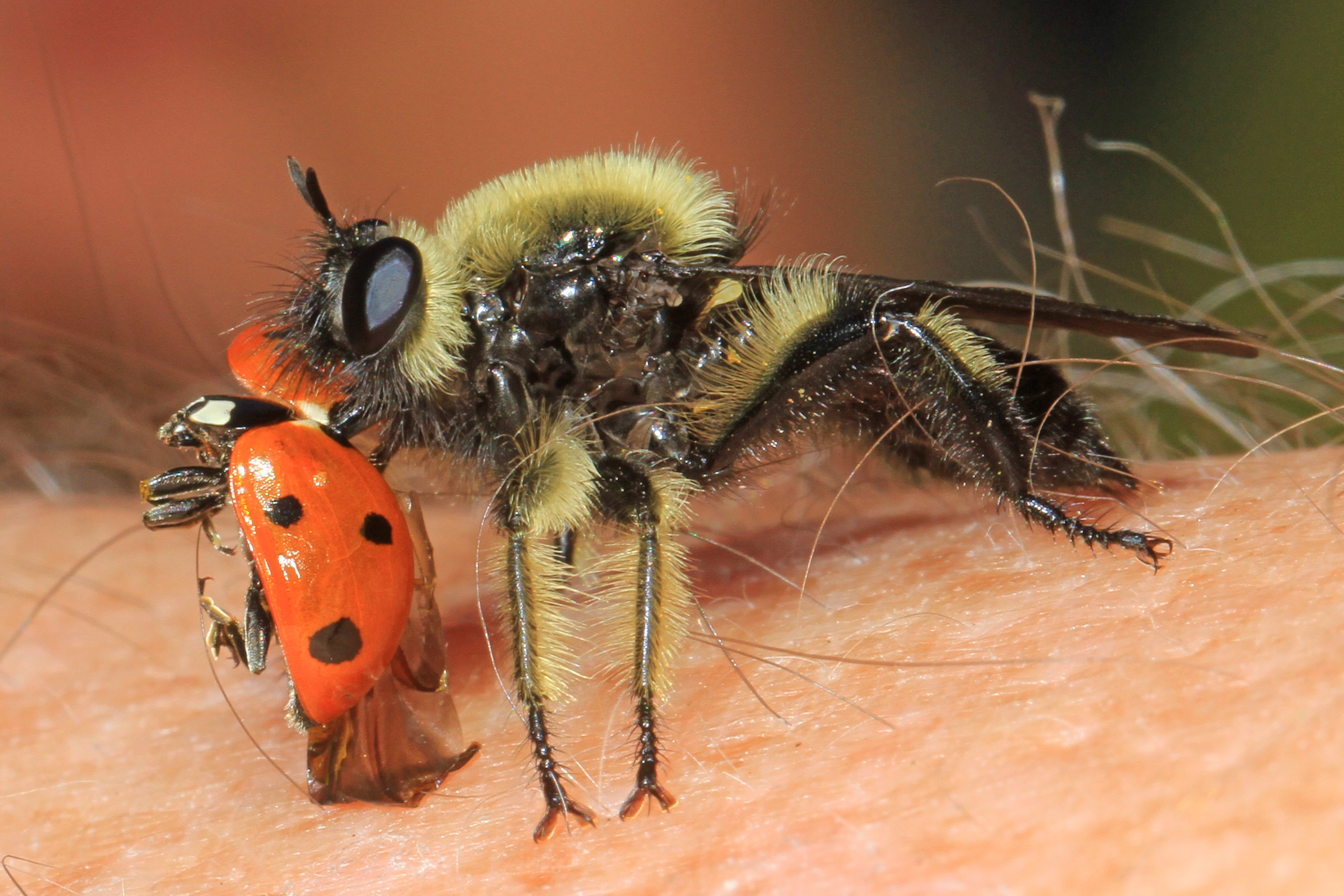

Scientific classification
- Domain: Eukaryota
- Kingdom: Animalia
- Phylum: Arthropoda
- Class: Insecta
- Order: Diptera
- Family: Asilidae
- Genus: Laphria
- Species: L. affinis

Binomial name
- Laphria affinis Macquart, 1855

= Laphria affinis =

Species of fly

Laphria affinis is a species of robber flies in the family Asilidae.
