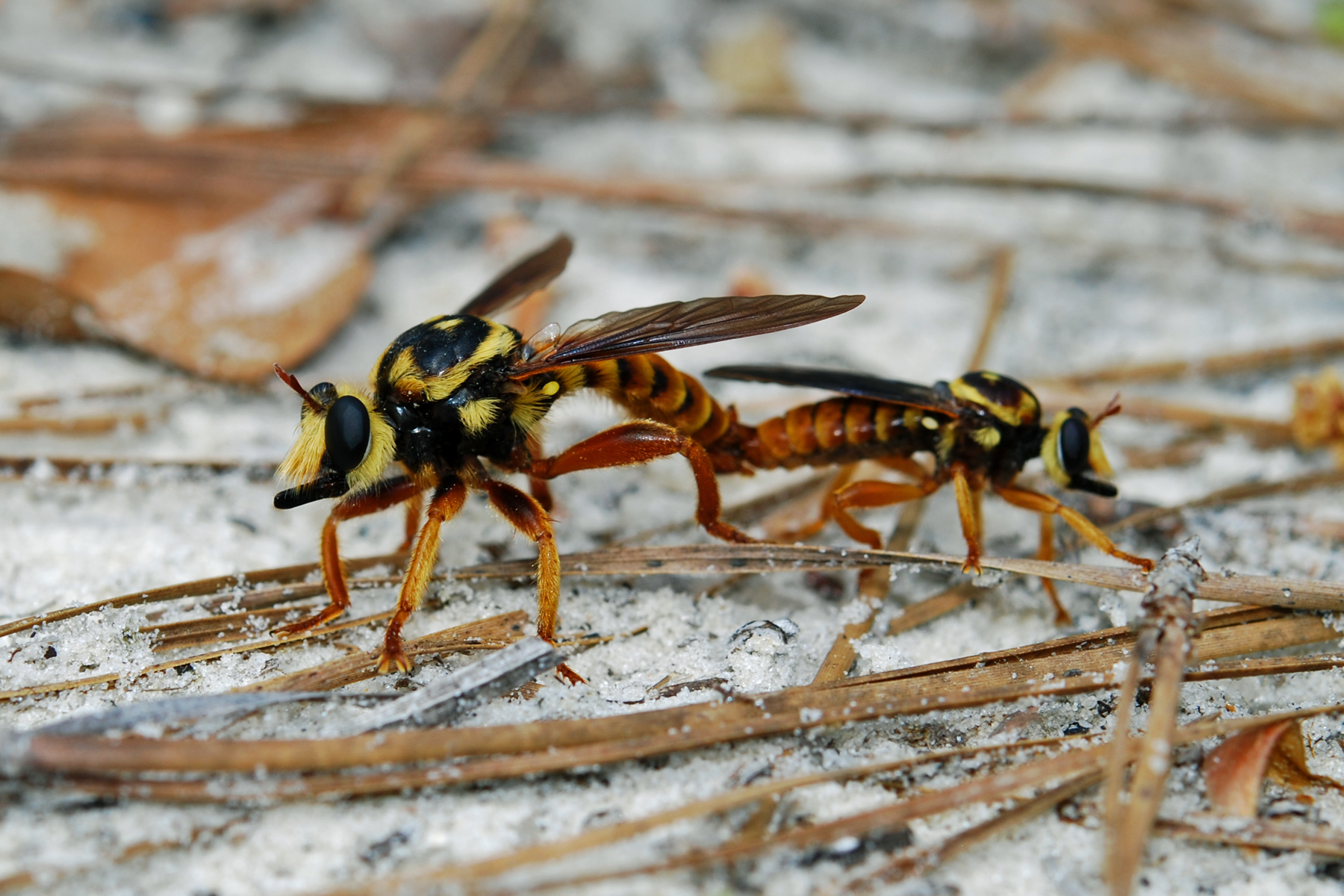

Scientific classification
- Domain: Eukaryota
- Kingdom: Animalia
- Phylum: Arthropoda
- Class: Insecta
- Order: Diptera
- Family: Asilidae
- Genus: Laphria
- Species: L. saffrana

Binomial name
- Laphria saffrana Fabricius, 1805

= Laphria saffrana =

Species of fly

Laphria saffrana is a species of robber flies in the family Asilidae.
