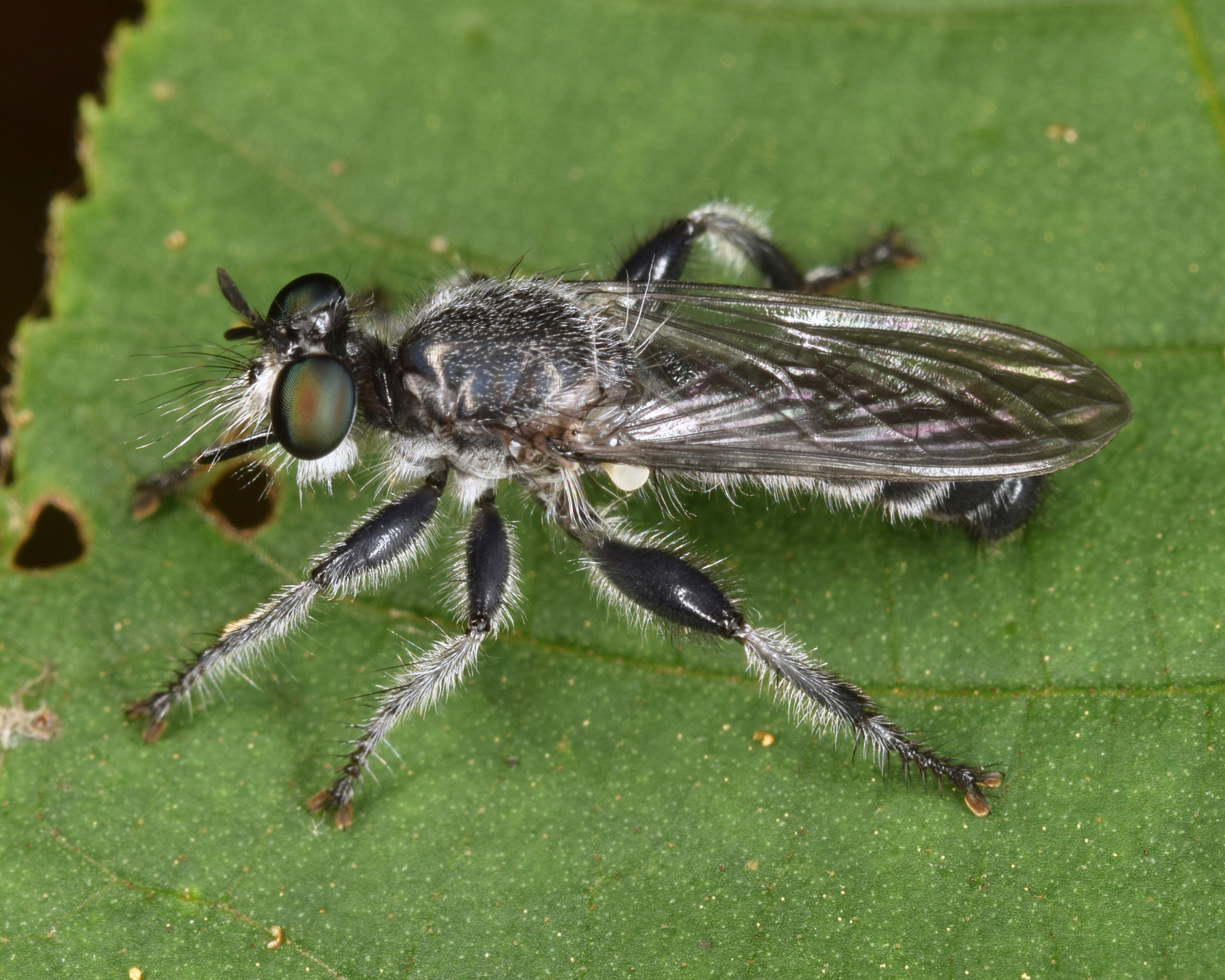

Scientific classification
- Domain: Eukaryota
- Kingdom: Animalia
- Phylum: Arthropoda
- Class: Insecta
- Order: Diptera
- Family: Asilidae
- Genus: Laphria
- Species: L. canis

Binomial name
- Laphria canis Williston, 1883

Synonyms
- Laphria dispar Banks, 1911; Laphria disparella Banks, 1913

= Laphria canis =

Species of fly

Laphria canis is a species of robber flies in the family Asilidae.
