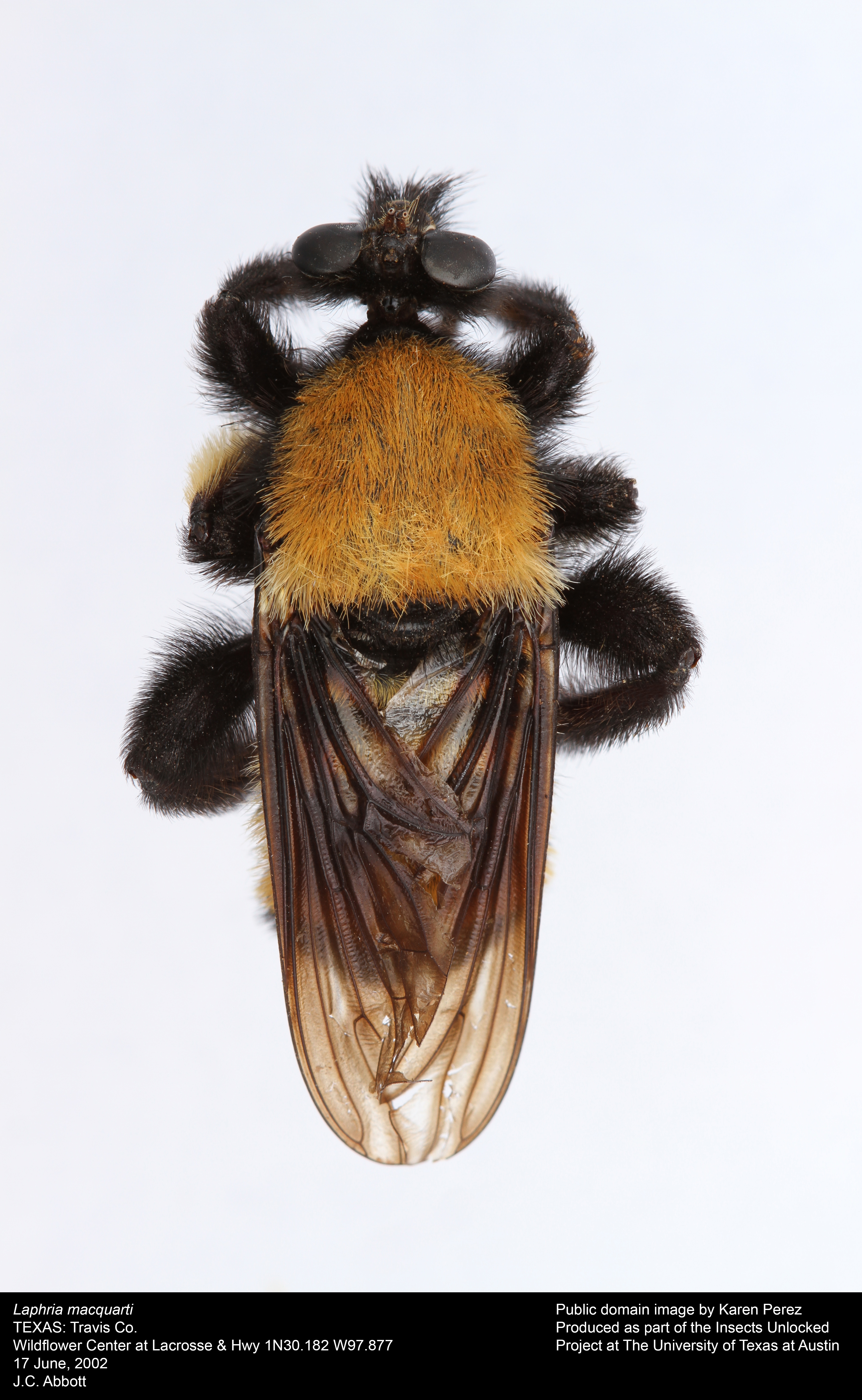

Scientific classification
- Domain: Eukaryota
- Kingdom: Animalia
- Phylum: Arthropoda
- Class: Insecta
- Order: Diptera
- Family: Asilidae
- Genus: Laphria
- Species: L. macquarti

Binomial name
- Laphria macquarti (Banks, 1917)

Synonyms
- Dasyllis macquarti Banks, 1917

= Laphria macquarti =

Species of fly

Laphria macquarti is a species of robber flies in the family Asilidae.
