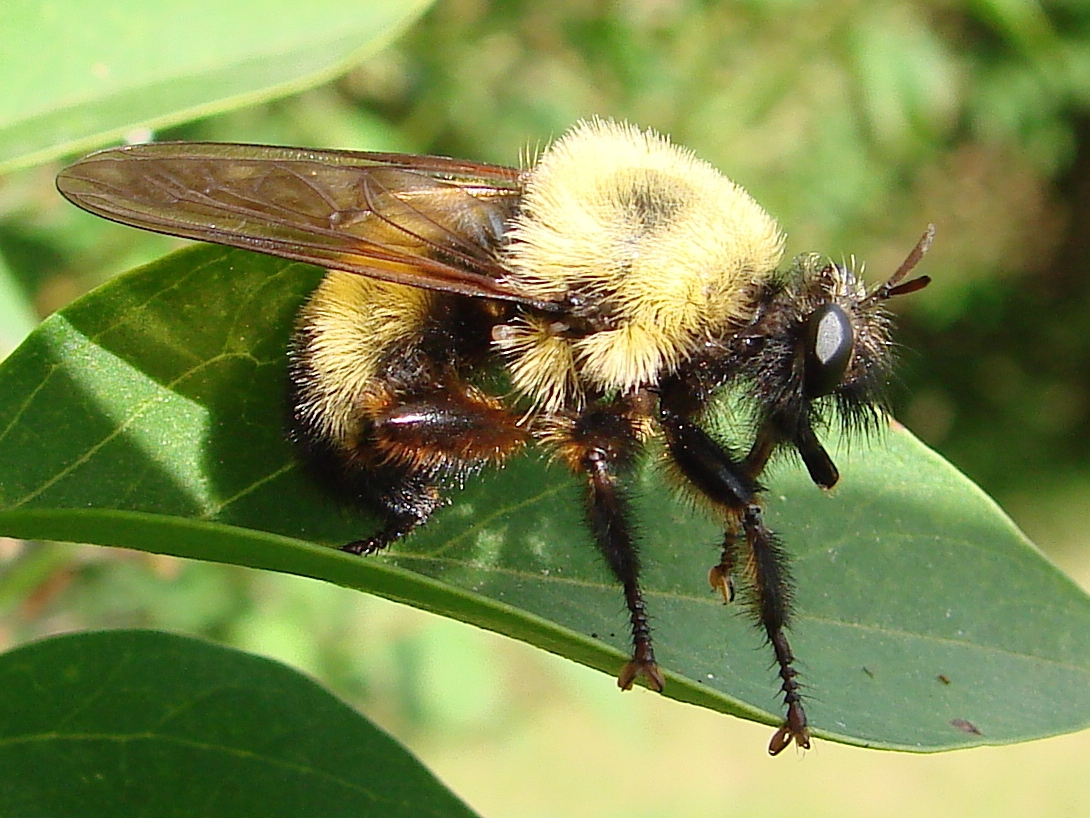

Scientific classification
- Domain: Eukaryota
- Kingdom: Animalia
- Phylum: Arthropoda
- Class: Insecta
- Order: Diptera
- Family: Asilidae
- Genus: Laphria
- Species: L. thoracica

Binomial name
- Laphria thoracica Fabricius, 1805

Synonyms
- Laphria alcanor Walker, 1849; Laphria fulvithorax Fabricius, 1805

= Laphria thoracica =

Species of fly

Laphria thoracica is a species of robber flies in the family Asilidae.

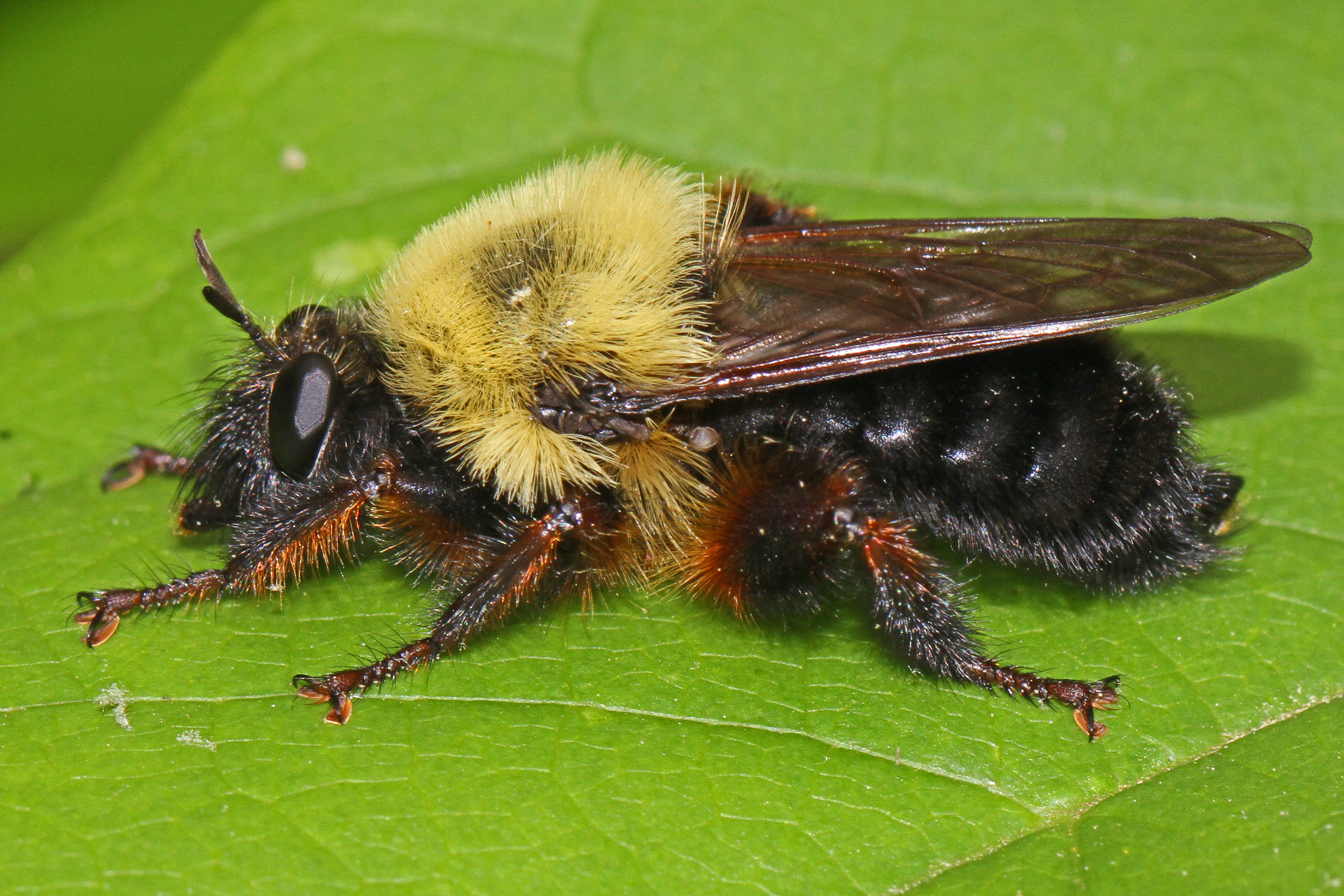

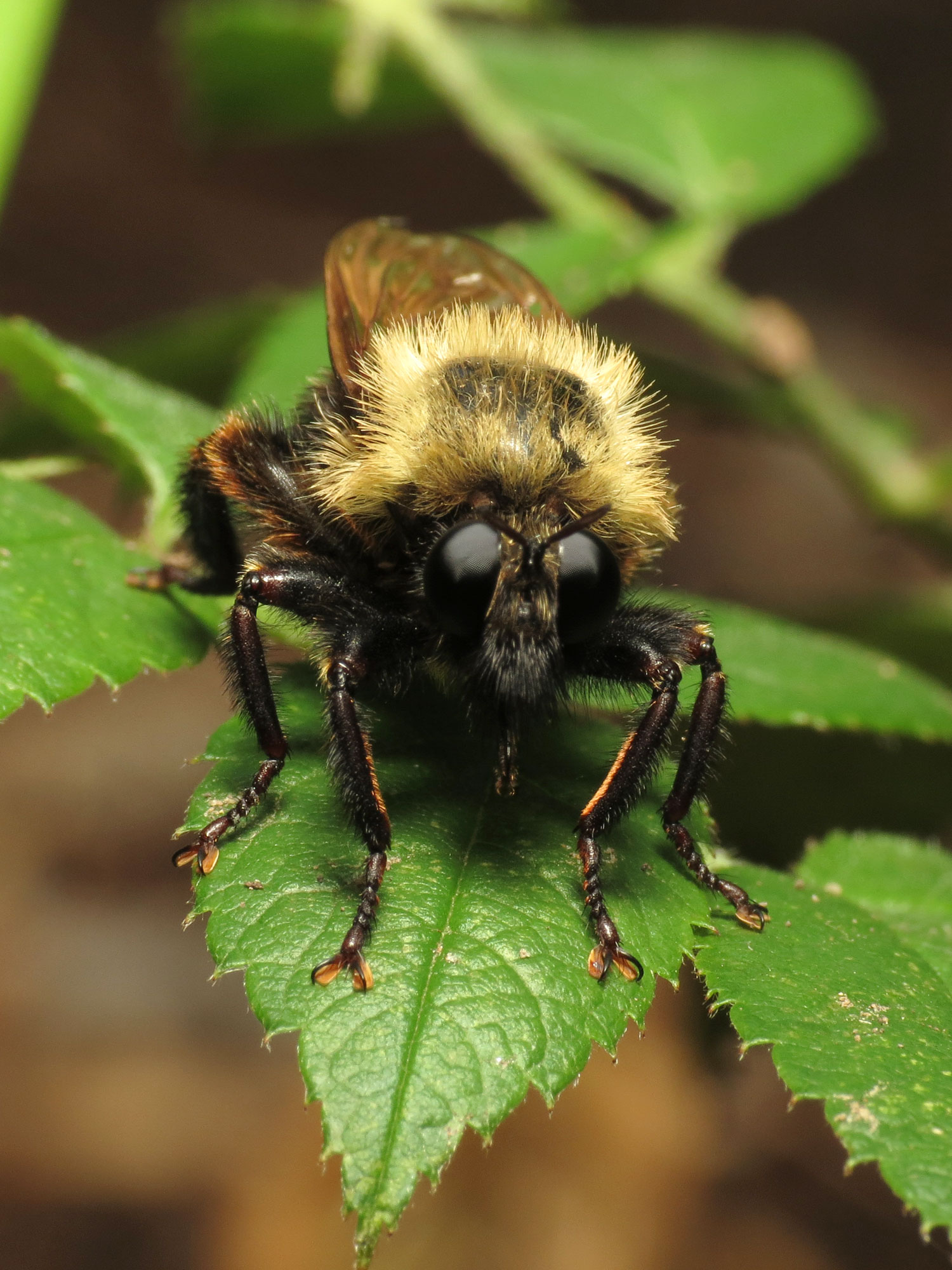

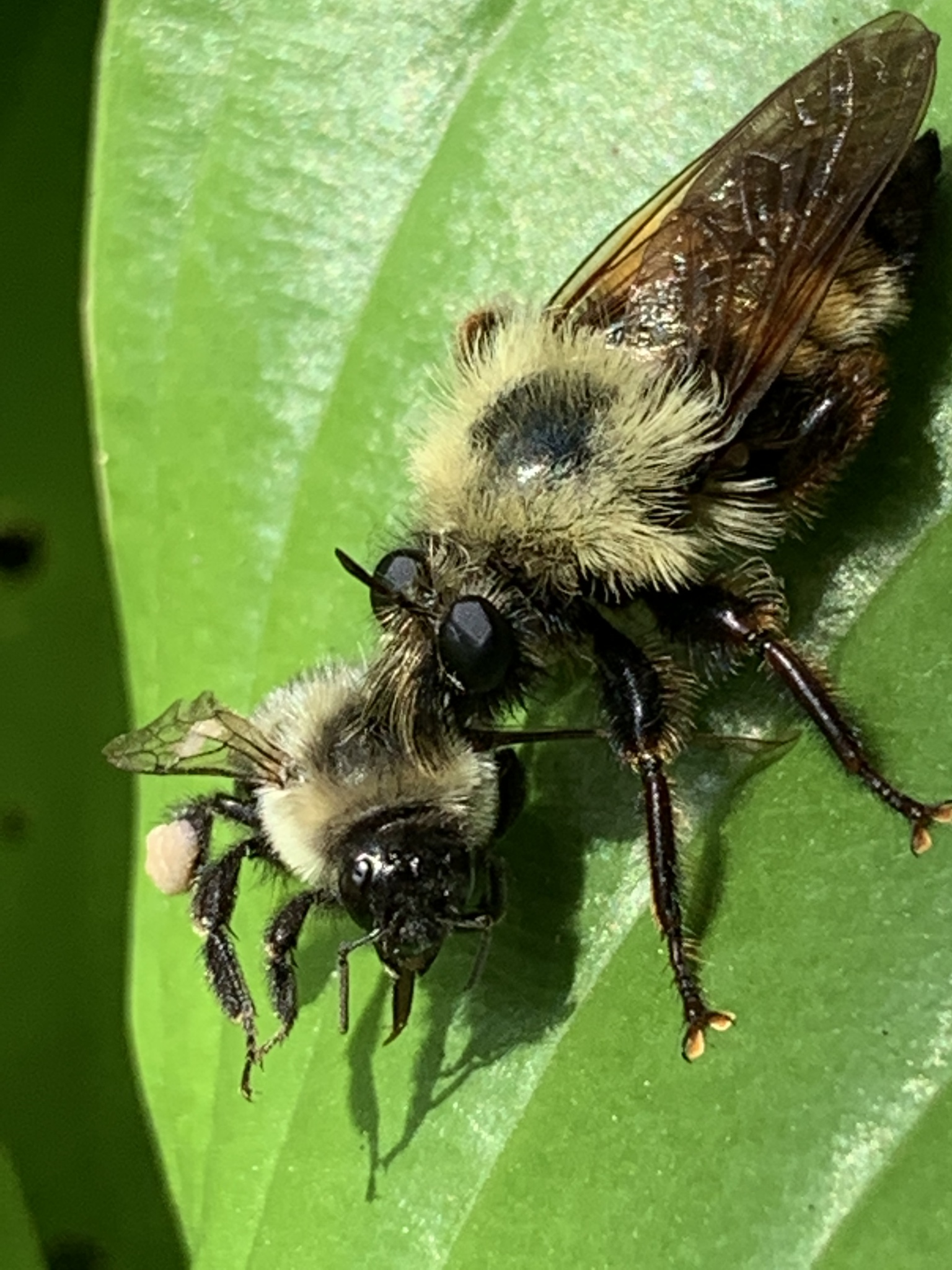
Eating a common eastern bumblebee
