= Laphria ventralis =

Scientific classification
- Domain: Eukaryota
- Kingdom: Animalia
- Phylum: Arthropoda
- Class: Insecta
- Order: Diptera
- Family: Asilidae
- Genus: Laphria
- Species: L. ventralis

Binomial name
- Laphria ventralis Williston, 1885

Species of fly

Laphria ventralis is a species of robber flies in the family Asilidae.
