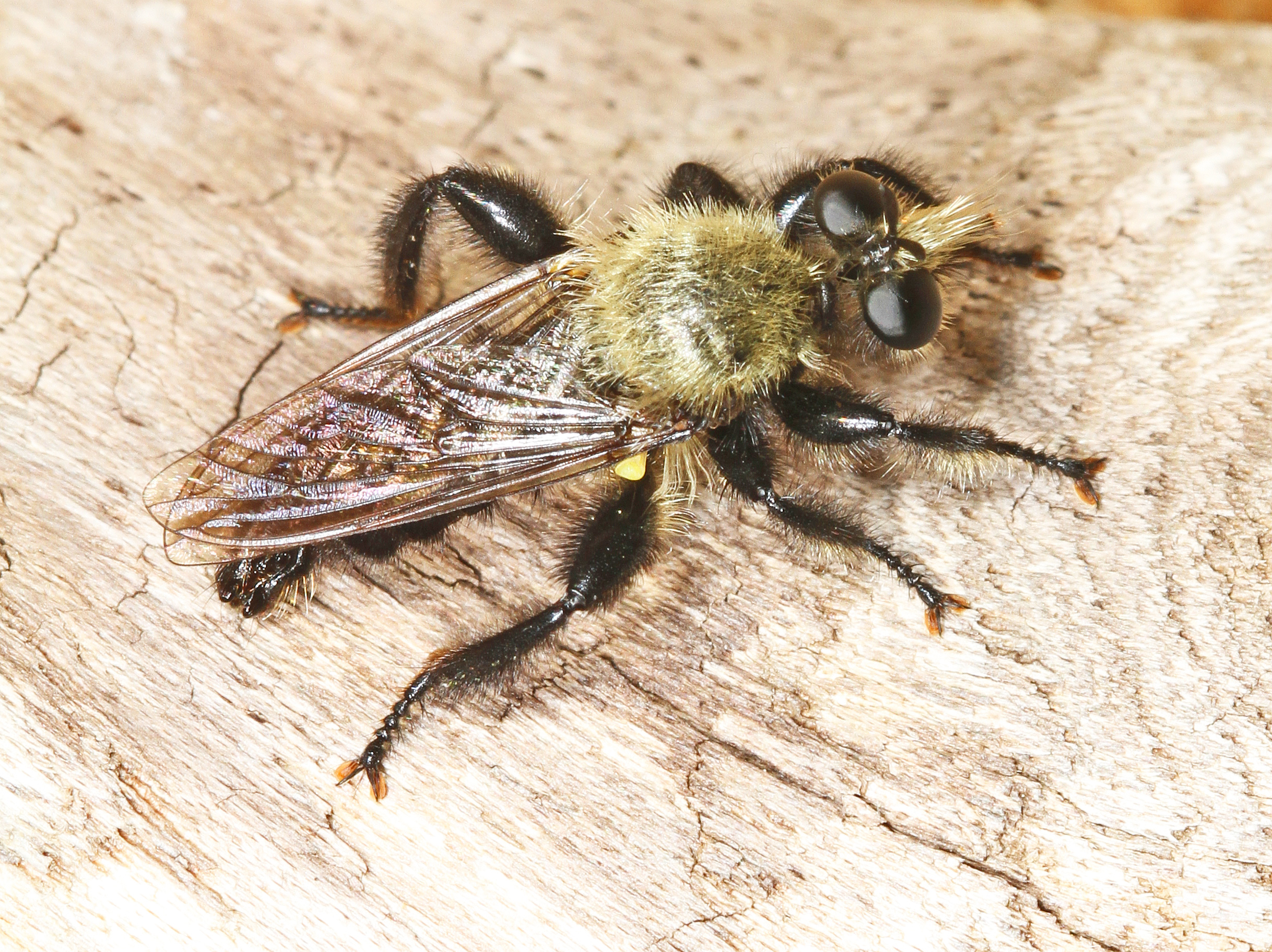

Scientific classification
- Domain: Eukaryota
- Kingdom: Animalia
- Phylum: Arthropoda
- Class: Insecta
- Order: Diptera
- Family: Asilidae
- Genus: Laphria
- Species: L. flavicollis

Binomial name
- Laphria flavicollis Say, 1824

Synonyms
- Laphria melanopogon Wiedemann, 1828

= Laphria flavicollis =

Species of fly

Laphria flavicollis is a species of robber flies in the family Asilidae. It can be found in deciduous woods.

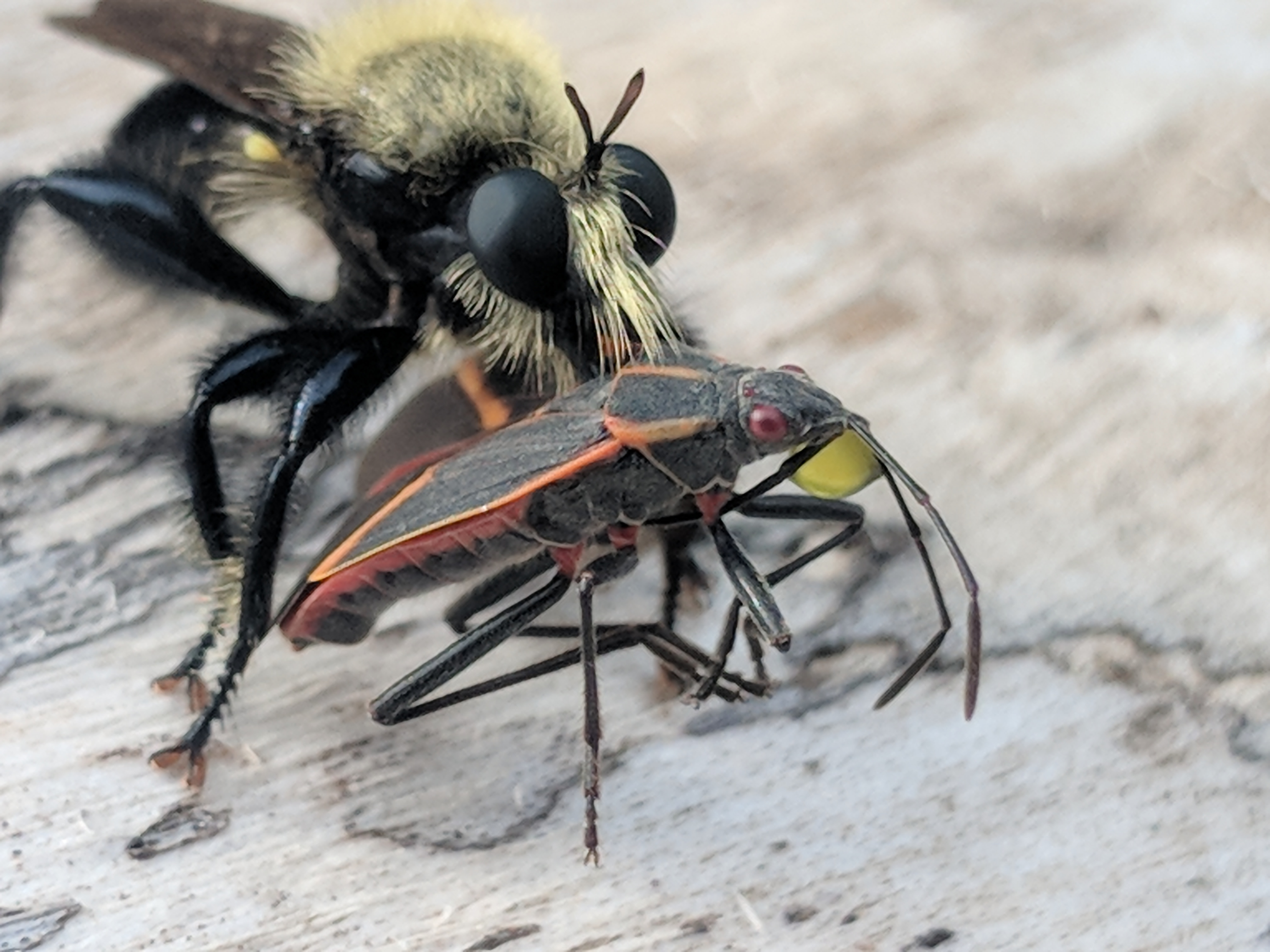
Female Laphria flavicollis eating a boxelder bug
