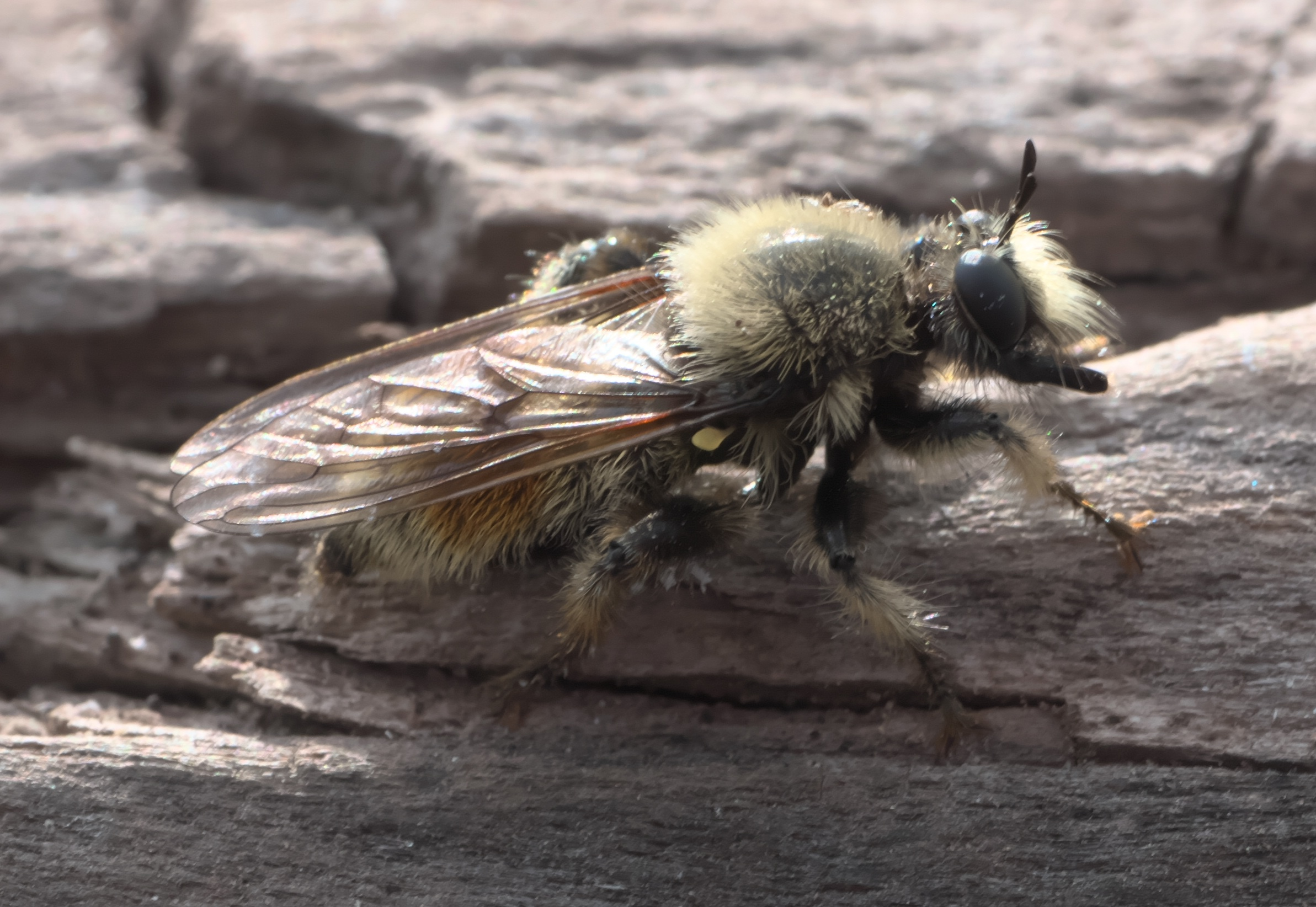

Scientific classification
- Domain: Eukaryota
- Kingdom: Animalia
- Phylum: Arthropoda
- Class: Insecta
- Order: Diptera
- Family: Asilidae
- Genus: Laphria
- Species: L. fernaldi

Binomial name
- Laphria fernaldi (Back, 1904)

Synonyms
- Dasyllis fernaldi Back, 1904

= Laphria fernaldi =

Species of fly

Laphria fernaldi is a species of robber flies in the family Asilidae.

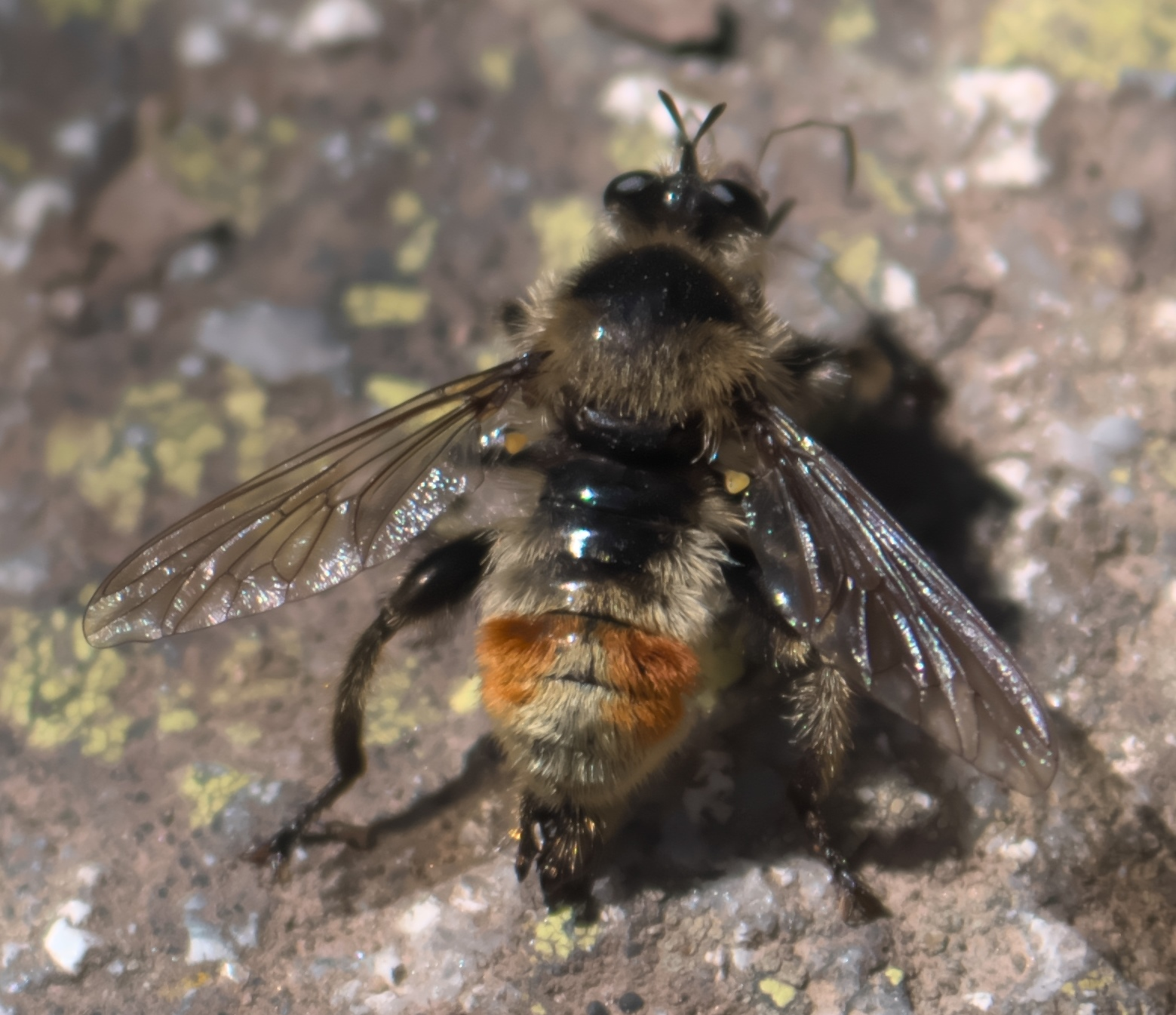
