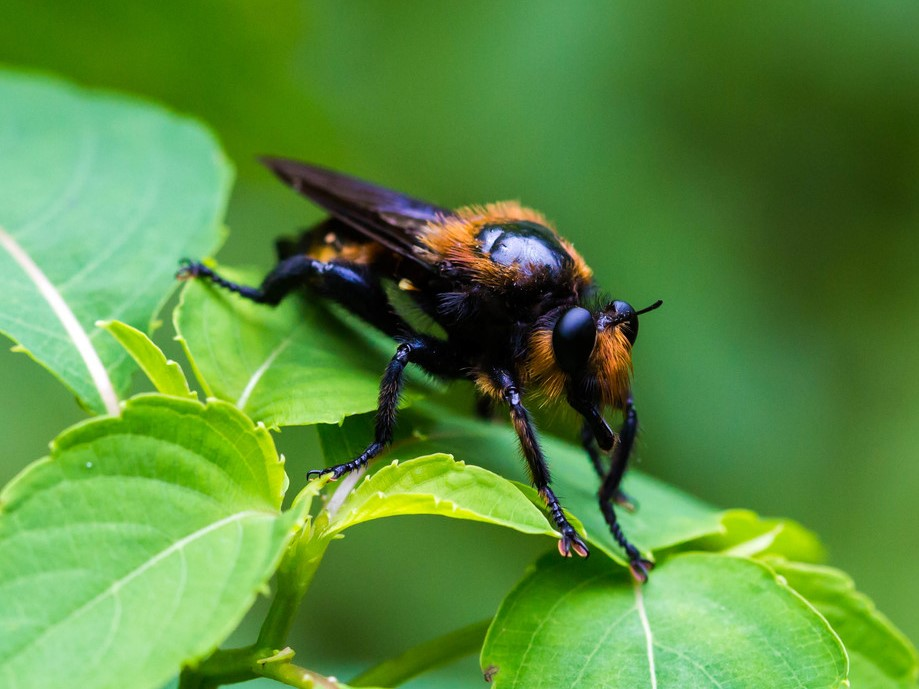

Scientific classification
- Domain: Eukaryota
- Kingdom: Animalia
- Phylum: Arthropoda
- Class: Insecta
- Order: Diptera
- Family: Asilidae
- Genus: Laphria
- Species: L. apila

Binomial name
- Laphria apila (Bromley, 1951)

Synonyms
- Bombomima apila Bromley, 1951

= Laphria apila =

Species of fly

Laphria apila is a species of robber fly in the family Asilidae.
