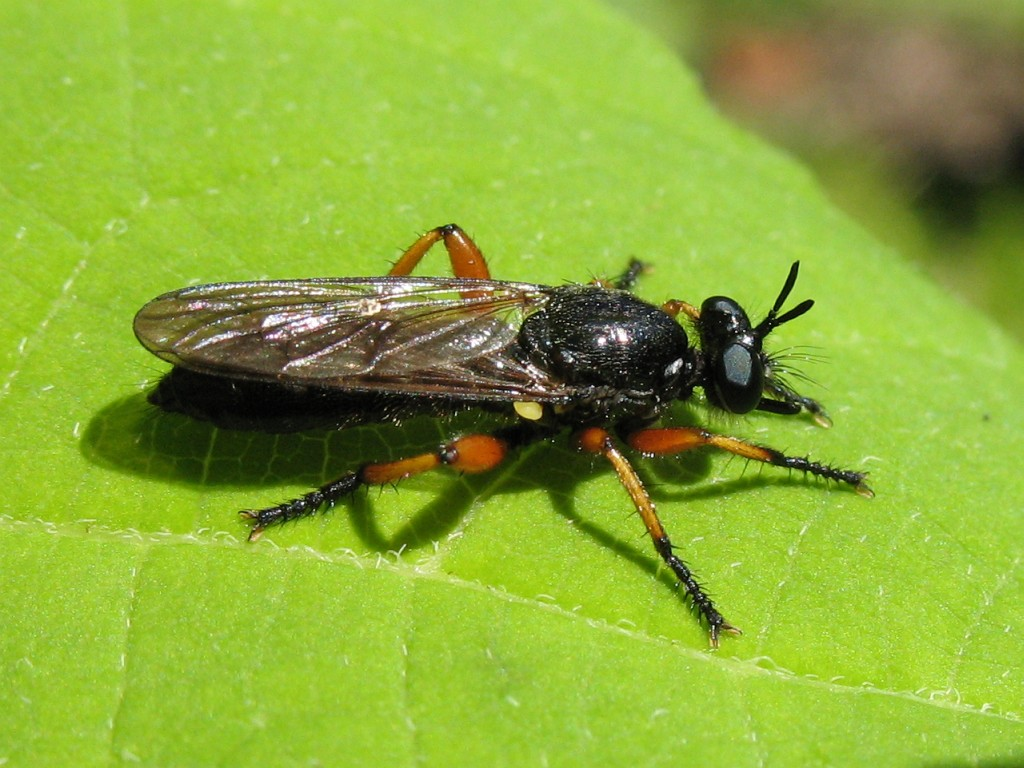
- Laphria sadales

Scientific classification
- Kingdom: Animalia
- Phylum: Arthropoda
- Class: Insecta
- Order: Diptera
- Family: Asilidae
- Subfamily: Laphriinae
- Genus: Laphria; Meigen, 1803

= Laphria (fly) =

Genus of flies

Laphria is a genus described by Johann Wilhelm Meigen in 1803, belonging to the family Asilidae, subfamily Laphriinae. Members of this genus are known as bee-like robber flies. This genus has a Holarctic distribution, occurring in Europe, Asia, and North America.

== Diet ==
They prey on a variety of insects, including other robber flies, bees, wasps and beetles. Like other asilids, they use their proboscis to penetrate the body of their prey and inject enzymes which dissolve the tissues.

== Description ==
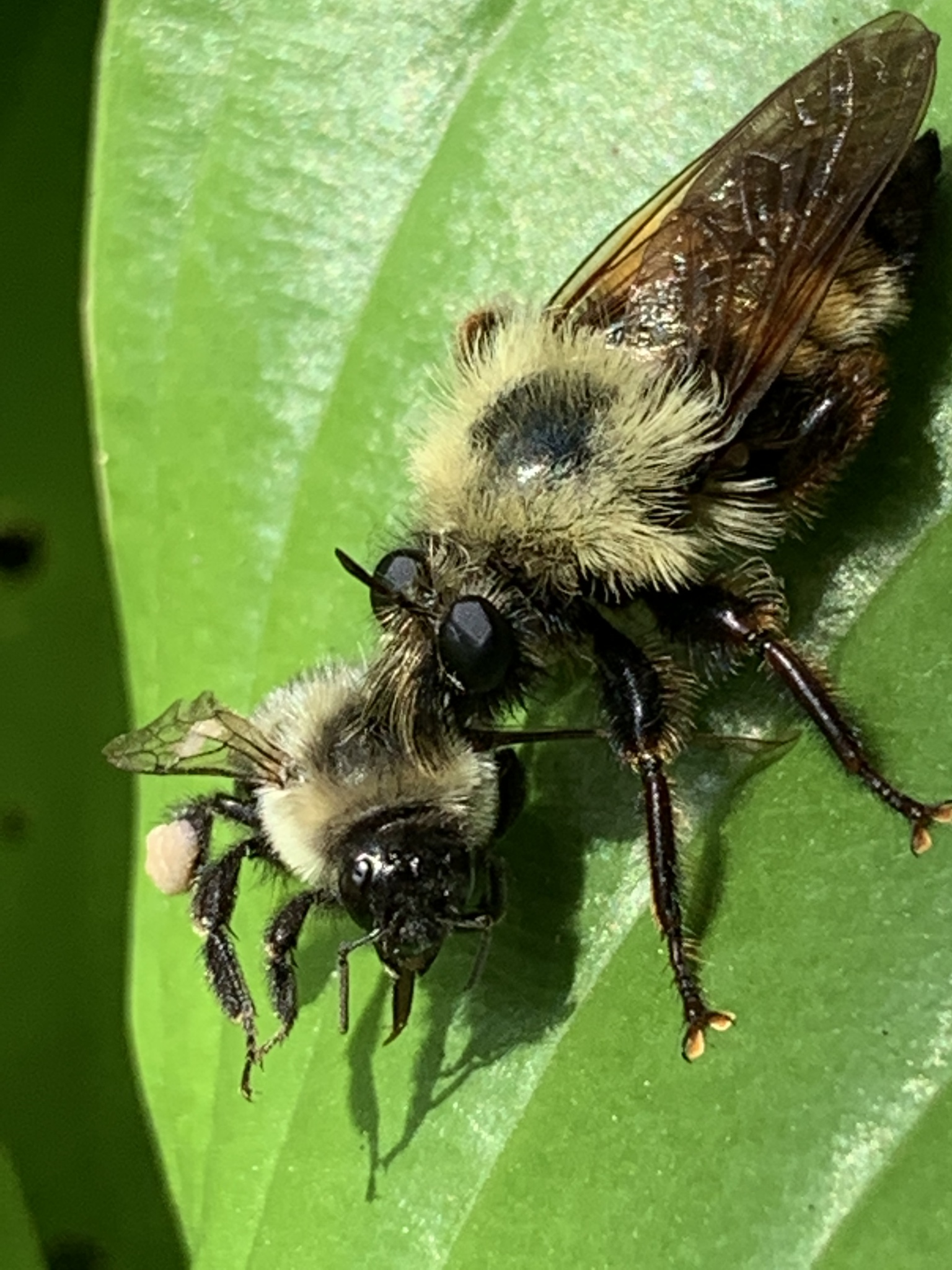
Laphria thoracica eating a common eastern bumblebee

These large flies measure 15–25 mm (0.59–0.98 in) in length. Most Laphria species are quite hairy and black in color. Some have bee-mimicking markings with black and yellow stripes and pollen hairs (like Laphria thoracica).

== Species ==
Select species include:

- Laphria affinis Macquart, 1855
- Laphria aktis Mcatee, 1919
- Laphria altitudinum Bromley, 1924
- Laphria apila (Bromley, 1951)
- Laphria aurea (Fabricius, 1794)
- Laphria canis Williston, 1883
- Laphria ephippium (Fabricius, 1781)
- Laphria fernaldi (Back, 1904)
- Laphria flava (Linnaeus, 1761)
- Laphria flavescens Macquart, 1838
- Laphria flavicollis Say, 1824
- Laphria gilva (Linnaeus, 1758)
- Laphria ithypyga Mcatee, 1919
- Laphria ivorina Oldroyd, 1968
- Laphria kistjakovskiji Paramonov, 1929
- Laphria sadales Walker, 1849
- Laphria saffrana Fabricius, 1805
- Laphria sapporensis Matsumura, 1911
- Laphria thoracica Fabricius, 1805
- Laphria tibialis Meigen, 1820
- Laphria venezuelensis Macquart, 1846
- Laphria ventralis Williston, 1885
- Laphria violacea Macquart, 1846
- Laphria vulpina Meigen, 1820
- Laphria xanthothrix Hermann, 1914
- Laphria yamatonis Matsumura, 1916
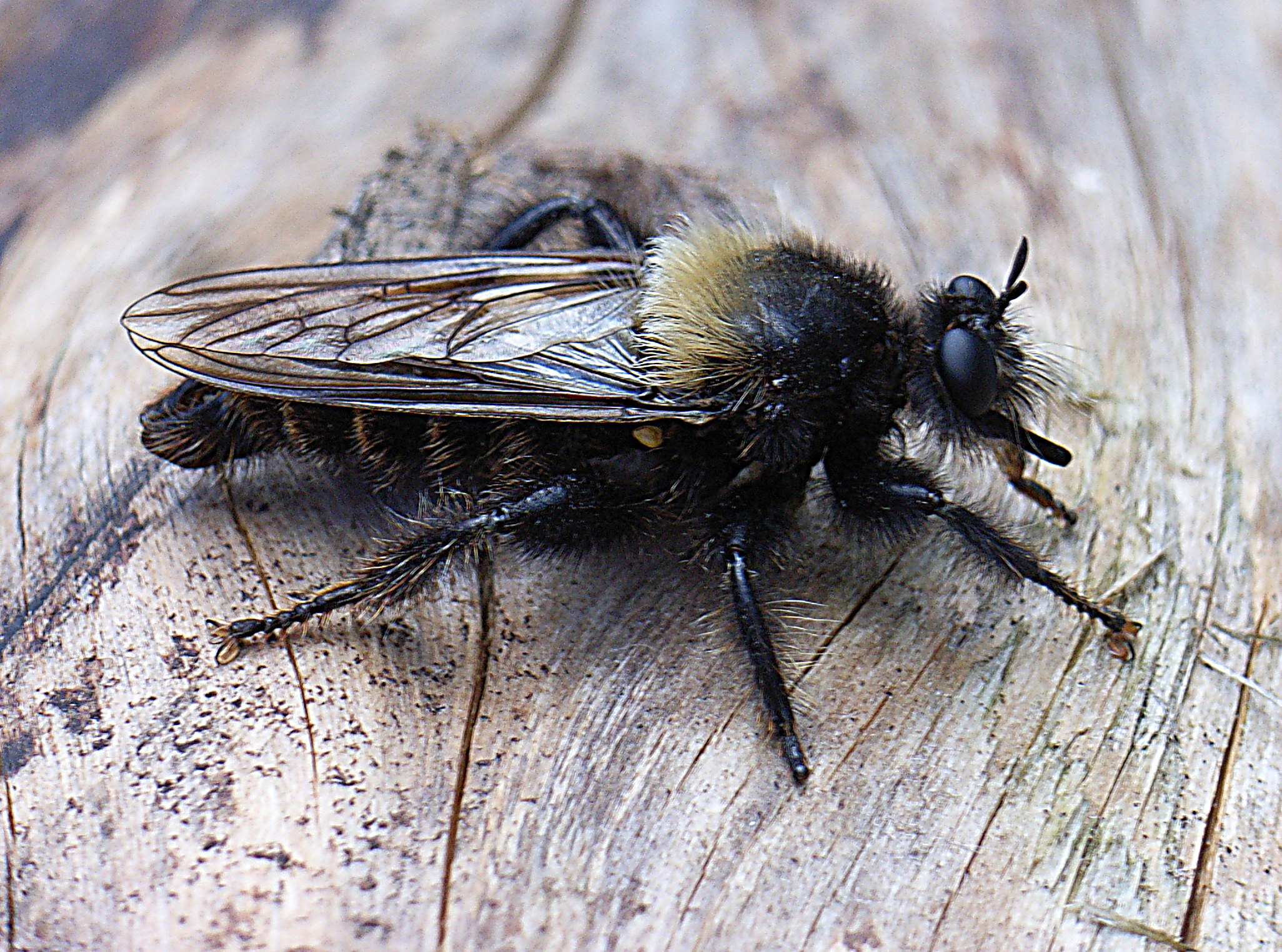
Laphria ephippium

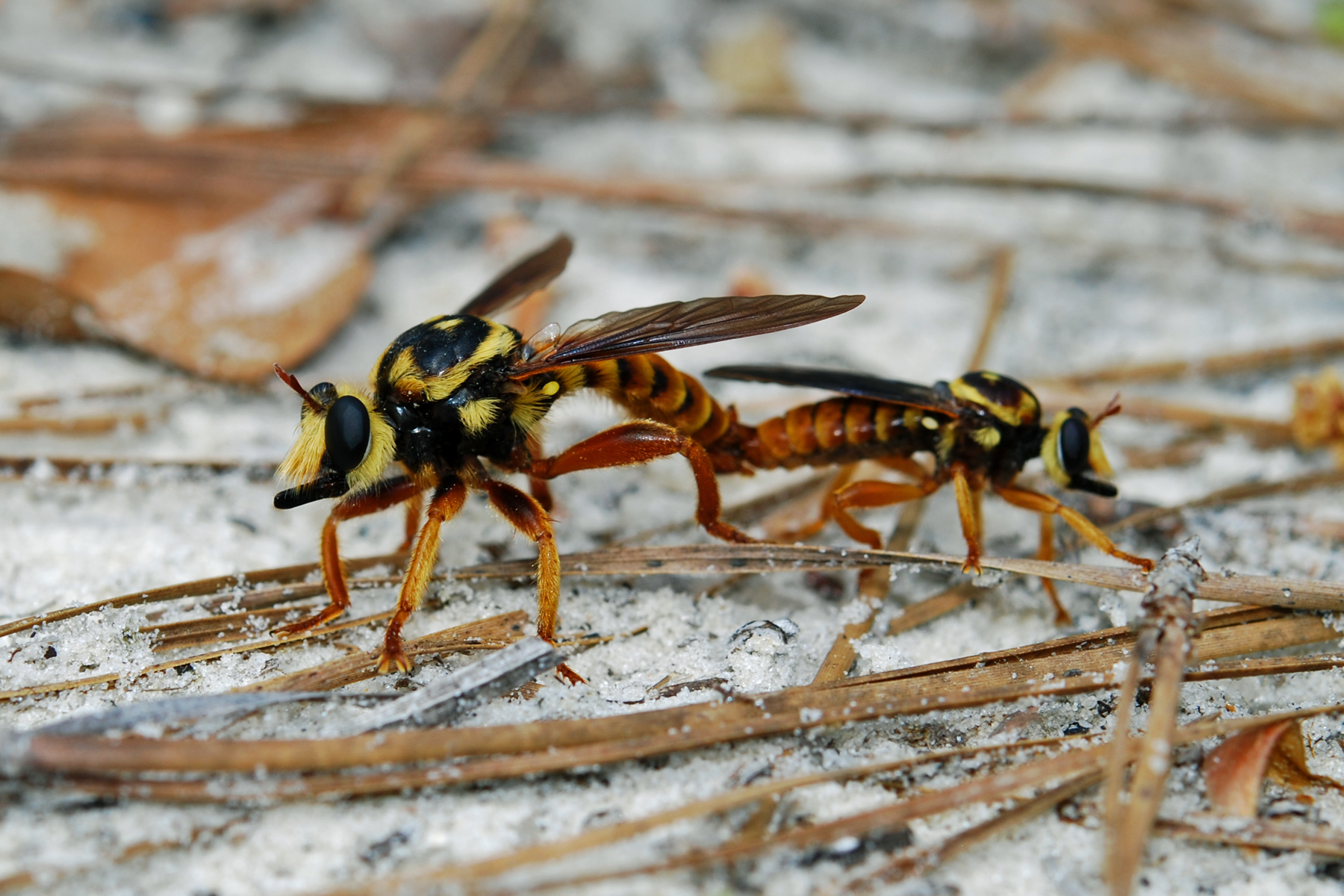
Laphria saffrana

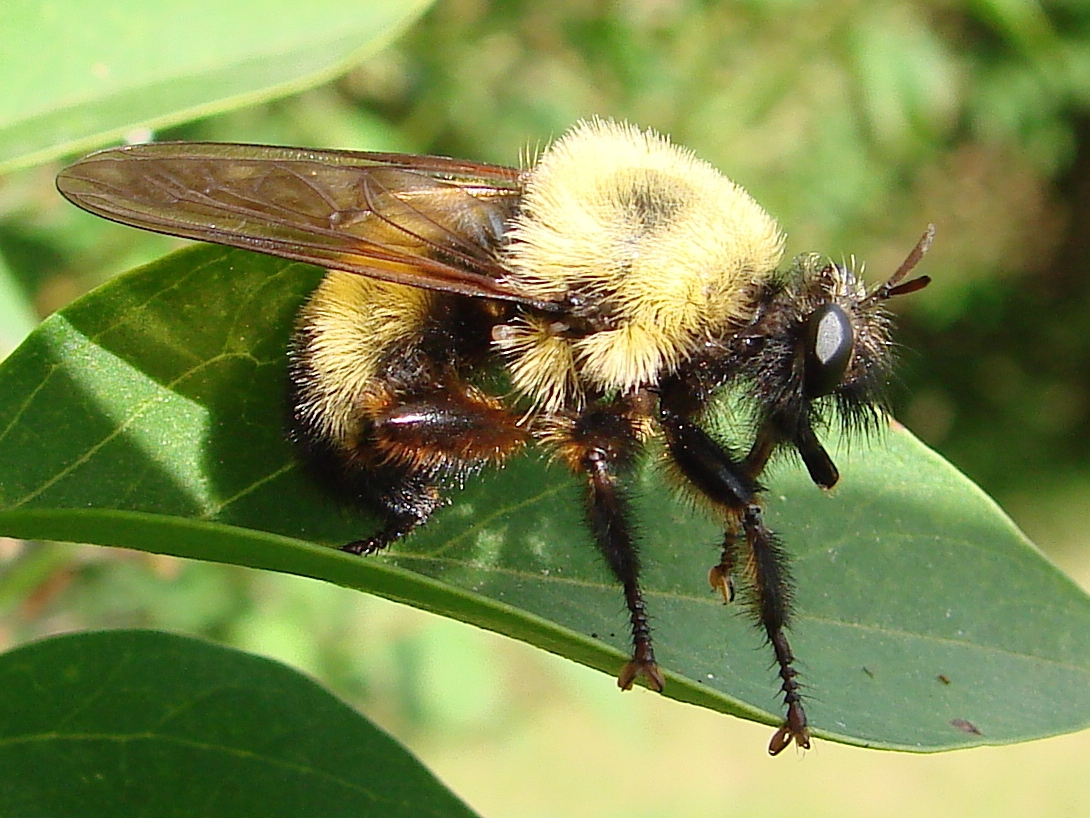
Laphria thoracica

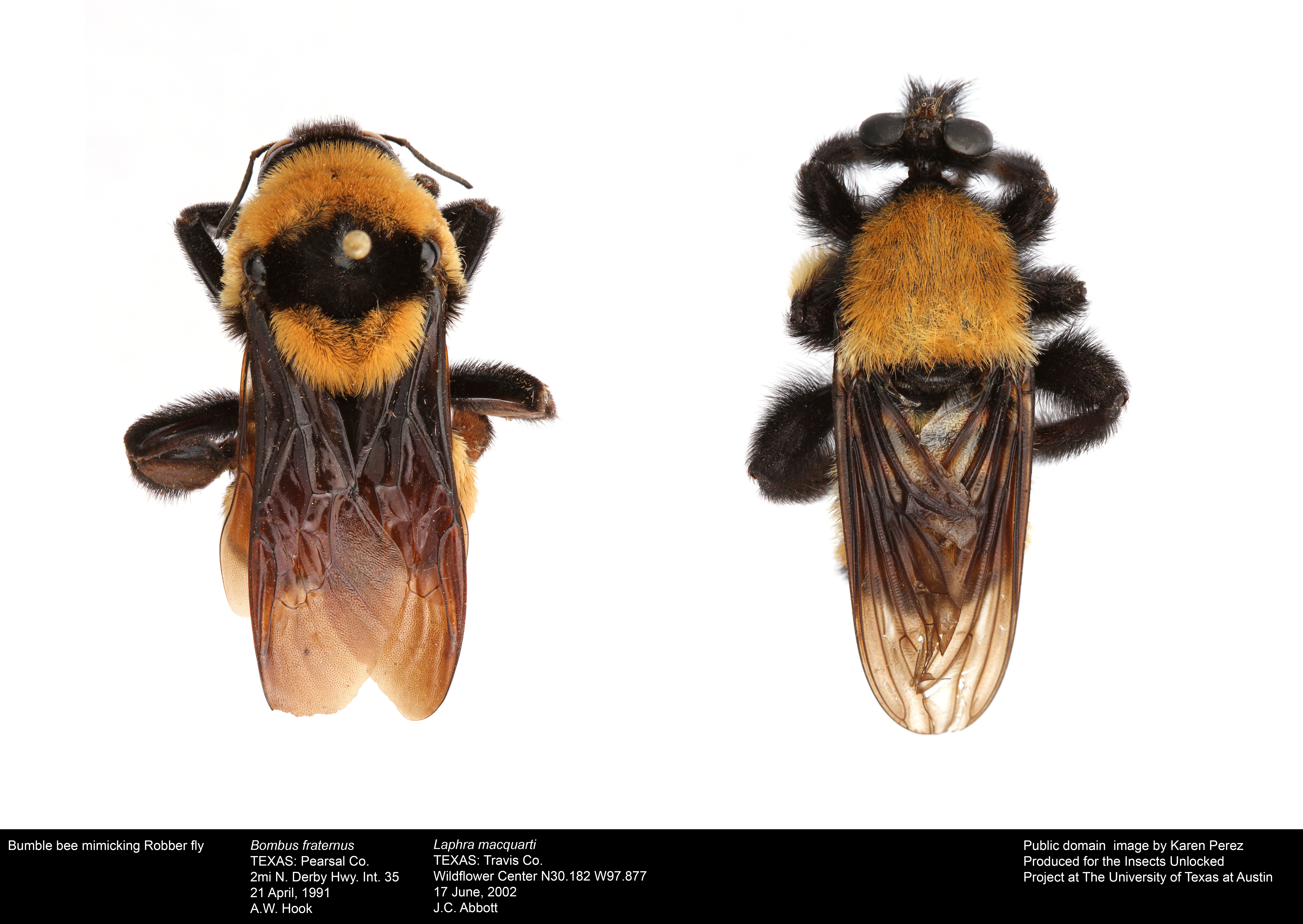
Laphria macquarti and a Bombus model
