= List of Asilidae species: D =

This article lists described species of the family Asilidae start with letter D.

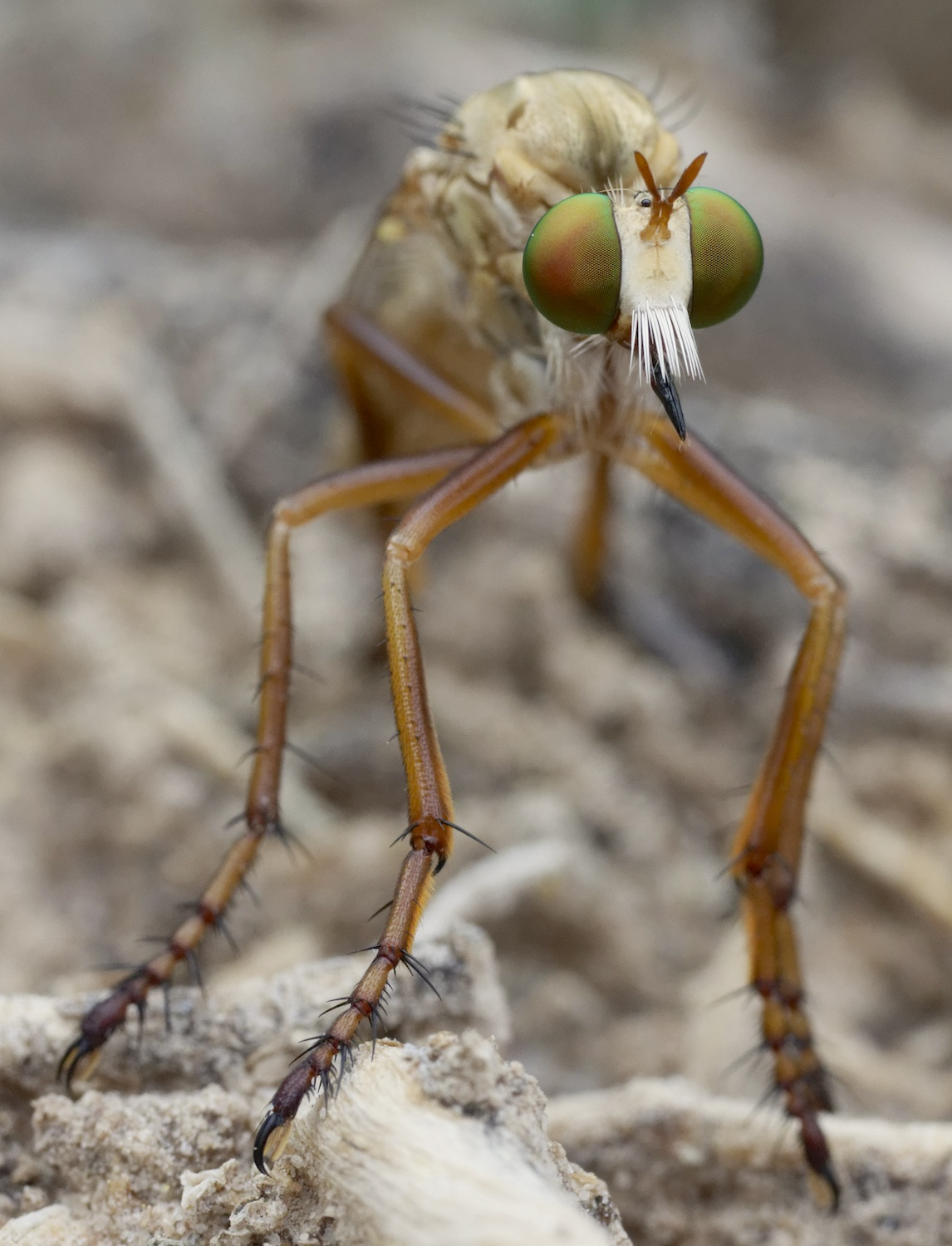
Front view of Diogmites angustipennis showing a genus character: the claw-like black spine at the end of the first tibia

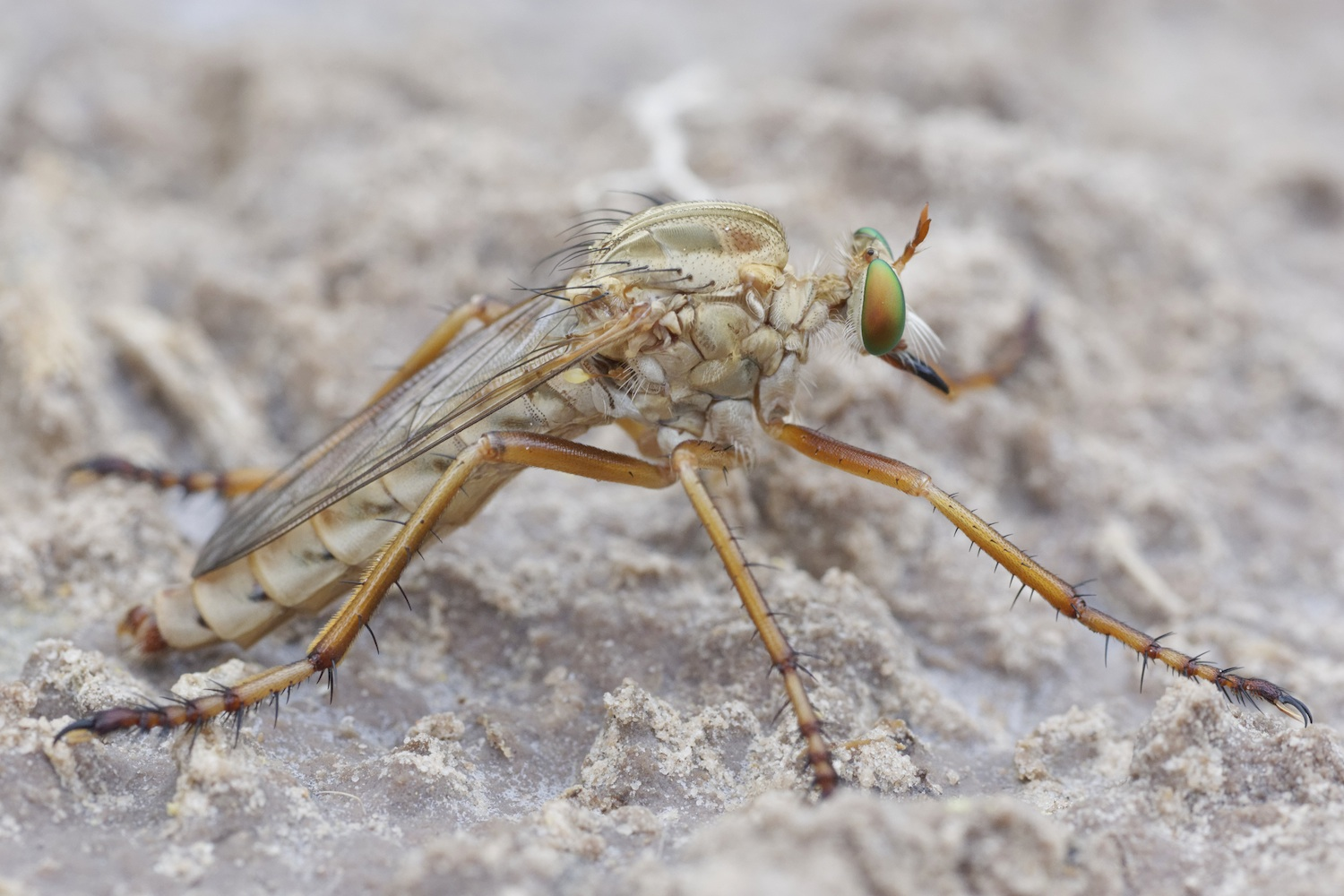
Side view of a male Diogmites angustipennis

A • B • C • D • E • F • G • H • I • J • K • L • M • N • O • P • Q • R • S • T • U • V • W • Y • Z

== List of species ==
=== Genus Dakinomyia ===
- Dakinomyia froggattii (Dakin & Fordham, 1922)
- Dakinomyia secuta (Daniels, 1979)

=== Genus Damalina ===
- Damalina bicolora (Tomasovic, 2007)
- Damalina hirsuta (Wulp, 1872)
- Damalina hirtipes (Meijere, 1914)
- Damalina laticeps (Doleschall, 1858)
- Damalina nitida (Hermann, 1914)
- Damalina semperi (Osten-Sacken, 1882)

=== Genus Damalis ===
- Damalis achilles (Londt, 1989)
- Damalis albatus (Scarbrough, 2005)
- Damalis angola (Londt, 1989)
- Damalis artigasi (Joseph & Parui, 1985)
- Damalis basalis (Scarbrough, 2005)
- Damalis beijingensis (Shi, 1995)
- Damalis bicolor (Shi, 1995)
- Damalis brevis (Scarbrough, 2005)
- Damalis calicutensis (Joseph & Parui, 1990)
- Damalis carapacina (Oldroyd, 1972)
- Damalis cederholmi (Joseph & Parui, 1985)
- Damalis centurionis (Oldroyd, 1972)
- Damalis chelomakolon (Londt, 1989)
- Damalis compacta (Hull, 1962)
- Damalis concolor (Walker, 1861)
- Damalis conica (Shi, 1995)
- Damalis conspicua (Curran, 1934)
- Damalis dattai (Joseph & Parui, 1999)
- Damalis dentata (Joseph & Parui, 1987)
- Damalis divisa (Walker, 1855)
- Damalis dorsalis (Walker, 1857)
- Damalis doryphorus (Londt, 1989)
- Damalis dravidica (Joseph & Parui, 1985)
- Damalis drilus (Londt, 1989)
- Damalis dubia (Joseph & Parui, 1995)
- Damalis fascia (Shi, 1995)
- Damalis flaventis (Scarbrough, 2005)
- Damalis floresana (Frey, 1934)
- Damalis formosana (Frey, 1934)
- Damalis fulvus (Scarbrough, 2005)
- Damalis furcula (Londt, 1989)
- Damalis fuscipennis (Macquart, 1846)
- Damalis grossa (Schiner, 1868)
- Damalis himalayaensis (Joseph & Parui, 1987)
- Damalis hirtalula (Shi, 1995)
- Damalis hirtidorsalis (Shi, 1995)
- Damalis indica (Joseph & Parui, 1985)
- Damalis infuscata (Joseph & Parui, 1984)
- Damalis kassebeeri (Geller-Grimm, 1997)
- Damalis keralaensis (Joseph & Parui, 1985)
- Damalis knysna (Londt, 1989)
- Damalis kottayamensis (Joseph & Parui, 1995)
- Damalis londti (Scarbrough, 2005)
- Damalis limipidipennis (Joseph & Parui, 1990)
- Damalis lugens (Walker, 1861)
- Damalis macula (Scarbrough, 2005)
- Damalis monochaetes (Londt, 1989)
- Damalis neavei (Londt, 1989)
- Damalis nigella (Wulp, 1872)
- Damalis nigrabdomina (Shi, 1995)
- Damalis nigripalpis (Shi, 1995)
- Damalis nigriscans (Shi, 1995)
- Damalis pallida (Wulp, 1872)
- Damalis politus (Scarbrough, 2005)
- Damalis pseudoartigasi (Joseph & Parui, 1987)
- Damalis rufoabdominalis (Joseph & Parui, 1985)
- Damalis scrobiculata (Frey, 1934)
- Damalis sphekodes (Londt, 1989)
- Damalis spinifemurata (Shi, 1995)
- Damalis turneri (Londt, 1989)
- Damalis vitalisi (Frey, 1934)
- Damalis xaniomerus (Londt, 1989)

=== Genus Danomyia ===
- Danomyia aethiops (Londt, 1993)
- Danomyia forchhammeri (Londt, 1993)
- Danomyia habra (Londt, 1993)
- Danomyia hepsocrene (Londt, 1993)
- Danomyia pachyphallus (Londt, 1993)
- Danomyia sathos (Londt, 1993)
- Danomyia tanaos (Londt, 1993)

=== Genus Daptolestes ===
- Daptolestes nicholsoni (Hull, 1962)

=== Genus Dasophrys ===
- Dasophrys boslacus (Londt, 1981)
- Dasophrys brevistylus (Londt, 1981)
- Dasophrys bullatus (Londt, 1981)
- Dasophrys carinatus (Londt, 1981)
- Dasophrys compressus (Hull, 1967)
- Dasophrys crenulatus (Londt, 1981)
- Dasophrys croetzeei (Londt, 1985)
- Dasophrys dorattina (Londt, 1981)
- Dasophrys engeli (Londt, 1981)
- Dasophrys fortis (Londt, 1981)
- Dasophrys hypselopterus (Engel, 1929)
- Dasophrys hysnotos (Londt, 1981)
- Dasophrys irwini (Londt, 1981)
- Dasophrys loewi (Londt, 1981)
- Dasophrys minutus (Londt, 1981)
- Dasophrys montanus (Londt, 1981)
- Dasophrys nanus (Londt, 1981)
- Dasophrys natalensis (Ricardo, 1920)
- Dasophrys nigricans (Wiedemann, 1821)
- Dasophrys nigroflavipes (Hobby, 1933)
- Dasophrys nigroseta (Londt, 1981)
- Dasophrys oldroydi (Londt, 1981)
- Dasophrys reburrus (Londt, 1981)
- Dasophrys saliotragus (Londt, 1981)
- Dasophrys silvestris (Londt, 1981)
- Dasophrys swazi (Londt, 1981)
- Dasophrys umbripennis (Londt, 1981)

=== Genus Daspletis ===
- Daspletis hirtus (Ricardo, 1925)
- Daspletis lykos (Londt, 1985)
- Daspletis placodes (Londt, 1983)
- Daspletis stenoura (Londt, 1983)

=== Genus Dasylechia ===
- Dasylechia atrox (Williston, 1883)

=== Genus Dasyllis ===
- Dasyllis albicollis (Bigot, 1878)
- Dasyllis erythrura (Hermann, 1912)

=== Genus Dasypecus ===
- Dasypecus heteroneurus (Philippi, 1865)
- Dasypecus latus (Philippi, 1865)

=== Genus Dasypogon ===
- Dasypogon aequalis (Walker, 1857)
- Dasypogon albonotatus (Macquart, 1847)
- Dasypogon analis (Macquart, 1850)
- Dasypogon arcuatus (Fabricius, 1794)
- Dasypogon atripennis (Macquart, 1834)
- Dasypogon aurarius (Wiedemann, 1821)
- Dasypogon auripilus (Séguy, 1934)
- Dasypogon australis (Macquart, 1838)
- Dasypogon bacescui (Weinberg, 1979)
- Dasypogon brevipennis (Meigen, 1838)
- Dasypogon caffer (Wiedemann, 1828)
- Dasypogon caudatus (Fabricius, 1805)
- Dasypogon caudatus (Bigot, 1881)
- Dasypogon cephicus (Say, 1829)
- Dasypogon costalis (Lynch & Arribálzaga, 1880)
- Dasypogon crassus (Macquart, 1849)
- Dasypogon dorsalis (Macquart, 1848)
- Dasypogon fabricii (Wiedemann, 1820)
- Dasypogon flavipennis (Wiedemann, 1828)
- Dasypogon fossius (Walker, 1849)
- Dasypogon fraternus (Macquart, 1846)
- Dasypogon geradi (Weinberg, 1987)
- Dasypogon gougeleti (Bigot, 1878)
- Dasypogon iberus (Tomasovic, 1999)
- Dasypogon irinelae (Weinberg, 1986)
- Dasypogon lebasii (Macquart, 1838)
- Dasypogon lenticeps (Thomson, 1869)
- Dasypogon longus (Macquart, 1838)
- Dasypogon lugens (Philippi, 1865)
- Dasypogon magisi (Tomasovic, 1999)
- Dasypogon melanopterus (Loew, 1869)
- Dasypogon mexicanus (Macquart, 1846)
- Dasypogon nigripennis (Macquart, 1848)
- Dasypogon nigriventris (Dufour, 1833)
- Dasypogon occlusus (Meijere, 1906)
- Dasypogon olcesci (Bigot, 1878)
- Dasypogon parvus (Rondani, 1850)
- Dasypogon pumilus (Macquart, 1838)
- Dasypogon punctipennis (Macquart, 1838)
- Dasypogon regenstreifi (Weinberg, 1986)
- Dasypogon reinhardi (Wiedemann, 1824)
- Dasypogon rubiginipennis (Macquart, 1838)
- Dasypogon rubiginosus (Bigot, 1878)
- Dasypogon rubinipes (Becker, 1913)
- Dasypogon ruficauda (Fabricius, 1805)
- Dasypogon rufiventris (Wiedemann, 1821)
- Dasypogon rufiventris (Walker, 1854)
- Dasypogon sericeus (Philippi, 1865)
- Dasypogon tenuis (Macquart, 1838)
- Dasypogon tragicus (Wiedemann, 1828)
- Dasypogon tsacasi (Weinberg, 1991)

=== Genus Despotiscus ===
- Despotiscus simmondsi (Bezzi, 1928)

=== Genus Dichaetothyrea ===
- Dichaetothyrea clavifrons (Londt, 1982)

=== Genus Dicolonus ===
- Dicolonus nigricentrus (Adisoemarto & Wood, 1975)
- Dicolonus pulchrum (Adisoemarto & Wood, 1975)
- Dicolonus simplex (Loew, 1866)

=== Genus Dicranus ===
- Dicranus jaliscoensis (Williston, 1901)
- Dicranus nigerrimus (Carrera, 1955)
- Dicranus rutilus (Wiedemann, 1821)
- Dicranus tucma (Lynch & Arribálzaga, 1880)

=== Genus Dicropaltum ===
- Dicropaltum rubicundus (Hine, 1909)

=== Genus Dikowmyia ===
- Dikowmyia mediorus (Londt, 2002)

=== Genus Dioctobroma ===
- Dioctobroma flavoterminatum (Hull, 1962)

=== Genus Dioctria ===
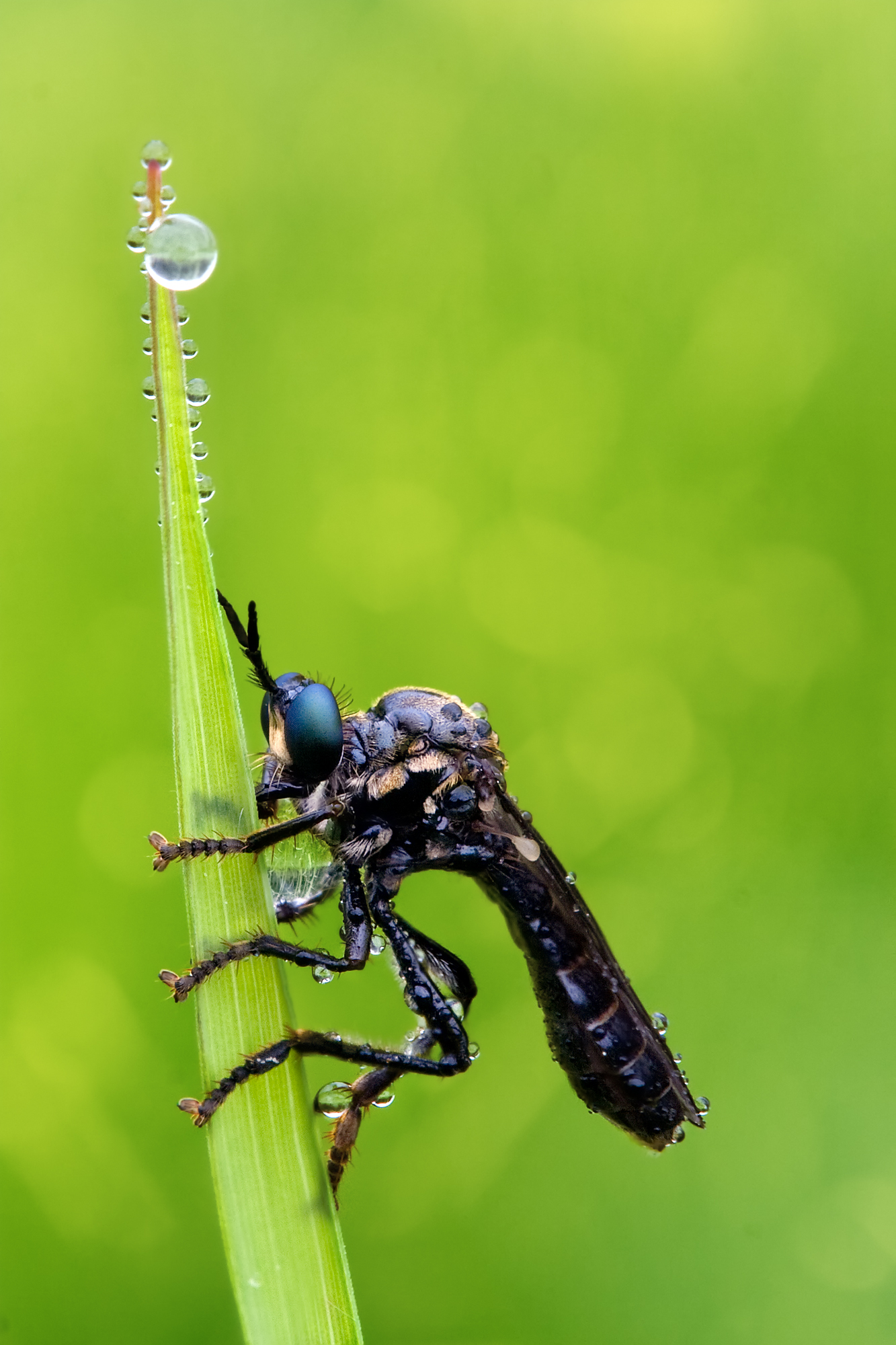
Dioctria atricapilla

Dioctria bicincta

Dioctria cothurnata male

Dioctria hyalipennis

Dioctria linearis

Dioctria rufipes

- Dioctria abdominalis (Becker, 1923)
- Dioctria annulata (Meigen, 1820)
- Dioctria arbustorum (Lehr, 1965)
- Dioctria arcana (Richter, 1966)
- Dioctria arnoldii (Richter, 1964)
- Dioctria arthritica (Loew, 1871)
- Dioctria atricapilla (Meigen, 1804)
- Dioctria atrorubens (Séguy, 1930)
- Dioctria berlandi (Séguy, 1927)
- Dioctria bicincta (Meigen, 1820)
- Dioctria bigoti (Costa, 1884)
- Dioctria bithynica (Janssens, 1968)
- Dioctria bulgarica (Hradský & Moucha, 1964)
- Dioctria caesia (Wiedemann, 1818)
- Dioctria calceata (Meigen, 1820)
- Dioctria claripennis (Villeneuve, 1908)
- Dioctria clavifrons (Enderlein, 1934)
- Dioctria concoloris (Esipenko, 1971)
- Dioctria conspicua (Becker, 1923)
- Dioctria contraria (Becker, 1923)
- Dioctria cornuta (Lehr, 2002)
- Dioctria cothurnata (Meigen, 1820)
- Dioctria cretensis (Becker, 1923)
- Dioctria danica (Schrank, 1803)
- Dioctria dispar (Loew, 1871)
- Dioctria flavicincta (Meigen, 1820)
- Dioctria freidbergi (Theodor, 1980)
- Dioctria gussakovskii (Lehr, 1965)
- Dioctria hermonensis (Theodor, 1980)
- Dioctria hohlbecki (Lehr, 1965)
- Dioctria humeralis (Zeller, 1840)
- Dioctria hyalipennis (Fabricius, 1794)
- Dioctria keremza (Richter, 1970)
- Dioctria kowarzi (Frivaldszky, 1877)
- Dioctria lata (Loew, 1853)
- Dioctria leleji (Lehr, 1999)
- Dioctria lenta (Becker, 1923)
- Dioctria linearis (Fabricius, 1787)
- Dioctria liturata (Loew, 1873)
- Dioctria longicornis (Meigen, 1820)
- Dioctria lugens (Loew, 1873)
- Dioctria maslovi (Esipenko, 1971)
- Dioctria meridionalis (Bezzi, 1898)
- Dioctria mixta (Becker, 1923)
- Dioctria nakanensis (Matsumura, 1916)
- Dioctria navasi (Séguy, 1929)
- Dioctria niedli (Moucha & Hradský, 1963)
- Dioctria nigribarba (Loew, 1871)
- Dioctria nigronitida (Lehr, 1965)
- Dioctria notha (Séguy, 1941)
- Dioctria ochrifacies (Becker, 1906)
- Dioctria parvula (Coquillett, 1893)
- Dioctria pilithorax (Richter, 1960)
- Dioctria pleuralis (Banks, 1917)
- Dioctria podagrica (Schrank, 1781)
- Dioctria pollinosa (Loew, 1870)
- Dioctria popovi (Lehr, 1965)
- Dioctria puerilis (Becker, 1923)
- Dioctria pusio (Osten-Sacken, 1877)
- Dioctria rufa (Strobl, 1906)
- Dioctria rufipes (De Geer, 1776)
- Dioctria rufithorax (Loew, 1853)
- Dioctria rufonigra (Theodor, 1980)
- Dioctria rungsi (Timon-David, 1951)
- Dioctria samarana (Becker, 1923)
- Dioctria scopini (Lehr, 1965)
- Dioctria segmentaria (Becker, 1923)
- Dioctria stigmatizans (Fabricius, 1805)
- Dioctria striata (Theodor, 1980)
- Dioctria sudetica (Duda, 1940)
- Dioctria valida (Loew, 1856)
- Dioctria variabilis (Lehr, 1965)
- Dioctria vera (Back, 1909)
- Dioctria vulpecula (Richter, 1973)
- Dioctria wiedemanni (Meigen, 1820)
- Dioctria wilcoxi (Adisoemarto & Wood, 1975)
- Dioctria zhelochovtzevi (Lehr, 1965)

=== Genus Diogmites ===
- Diogmites aberrans (Wiedemann, 1821)
- Diogmites affinis (Bellardi, 1861)
- Diogmites alvesi Carrera, 1949 the species author is not Curran, contrary to an error in multiple web databases
- Diogmites amethistinus Carrera, 1953
- Diogmites angustipennis Loew, 1866
- Diogmites anomalus Carrera, 1947
- Diogmites atriapex Carrera, 1953
- Diogmites aureolus Carrera & Papavero, 1962
- Diogmites basalis (Walker, 1851)
- Diogmites bellardi (Bromley, 1929)
- Diogmites bicolor (Jaennicke, 1867)
- Diogmites bifasciatus Carrera, 1949
- Diogmites bilineatus (Loew, 1866)
- Diogmites bilobatus Barnes, 2010
- Diogmites bimaculatus (Bromley, 1929)
- Diogmites bromleyi Carrera, 1949
- Diogmites brunneus (Fabricius, 1787)
- Diogmites castaneus (Macquart, 1838)
- Diogmites coffeatus (Wiedemann, 1819)
- Diogmites coloradensis (James, 1933)
- Diogmites contortus Bromley, 1936
- Diogmites craveri (Bellardi, 1861)
- Diogmites crudelis Bromley, 1936
- Diogmites cuantlensis (Bellardi, 1861)
- Diogmites discolor Loew, 1866
- Diogmites dubius (Bellardi, 1861)
- Diogmites duillius (Walker, 1849)
- Diogmites esuriens Bromley, 1936
- Diogmites fasciatus (Macquart, 1834)
- Diogmites ferrugineus (Lynch & Arribálzaga, 1880)
- Diogmites fragilis Bromley, 1936
- Diogmites goniostigma Bellardi, 1861
- Diogmites grossus (Bromley, 1936)
- Diogmites herennius (Walker, 1849)
- Diogmites heydenii (Jaennicke, 1867)
- Diogmites imitator Carrera, 1953
- Diogmites inclusus (Walker, 1851)
- Diogmites intactus (Wiedemann, 1828)
- Diogmites jalapensis Bellardi, 1861
- Diogmites lindigii (Schiner, 1868)
- Diogmites lineola (Bromley, 1934)
- Diogmites litoralis (Curran, 1930)
- Diogmites maculatus Curran, 1934
- Diogmites memnon Osten-Sacken, 1887
- Diogmites misellus Loew, 1866
- Diogmites missouriensis Bromley, 1951
- Diogmites neoternatus (Bromley, 1931)
- Diogmites nigripennis (Macquart, 1847)
- Diogmites nigripes (Bellardi, 1861)
- Diogmites nigritarsis (Macquart, 1846)
- Diogmites notatus Bigot, 1878
- Diogmites obscurus Carrera, 1949
- Diogmites perplexus Back, 1909
- Diogmites platypterus Loew, 1866
- Diogmites pritchardi Bromley, 1936
- Diogmites properans Bromley, 1936
- Diogmites pseudojalapensis (Bellardi, 1862)
- Diogmites pulcher (Back, 1909)
- Diogmites reticulatus (Fabricius, 1805)
- Diogmites rubescens (Bellardi, 1861)
- Diogmites rubrodorsatus (Artigas, 1966)
- Diogmites rufibasis Bigot, 1878
- Diogmites rufipalpis (Macquart, 1838)
- Diogmites sallei (Bellardi, 1861)
- Diogmites salutans Bromley, 1936
- Diogmites superbus Carrera, 1953
- Diogmites symmachus (Loew, 1872)
- Diogmites tau Osten-Sacken, 1887
- Diogmites teresita Lamas, 1972
- Diogmites ternatus Loew, 1866
- Diogmites texanus Bromley, 1934
- Diogmites tricolor (Bellardi, 1861)
- Diogmites unicolor Hull, 1958
- Diogmites virescens (Bellardi, 1861)
- Diogmites vulgaris Carrera, 1947
- Diogmites winthemi (Wiedemann, 1821)
- Diogmites wygodzinskyi Carrera, 1949
- Diogmites vulgaris (Carrera, 1947)
- Diogmites winthemi (Wiedemann, 1821)
- Diogmites wygodzinskyi (Carrera, 1949)

=== Genus Diplosynapsis ===
- Diplosynapsis argentifascia (Enderlein, 1914)
- Diplosynapsis cellatus (Schiner, 1868)
- Diplosynapsis halterata (Enderlein, 1914)
- Diplosynapsis remus (Tomasovic, 2002)

=== Genus Dissmeryngodes ===
- Dissmeryngodes amapa (Artigas & Papavero, 1991)
- Dissmeryngodes iracema (Artigas & Papavero, 1991)

=== Genus Dogonia ===
- Dogonia nigra (Oldroyd, 1970)
- Dogonia saegeri (Oldroyd, 1970)

=== Genus Dolopus ===
- Dolopus genitalis (Hardy, 1920)
- Dolopus mirus (Daniels, 1987)
- Dolopus silvestris (Daniels, 1987)
- Dolopus simulans (Daniels, 1987)

=== Genus Dysmachus ===
- Dysmachus albiseta (Becker, 1907)
- Dysmachus albisetosus (Macquart, 1850)
- Dysmachus albovestitus (Villeneuve, 1930)
- Dysmachus americanus (Macquart, 1846)
- Dysmachus antipai (Weinberg, 1968)
- Dysmachus appendiculatus (Schiner, 1867)
- Dysmachus atripes (Loew, 1871)
- Dysmachus basalis (Loew, 1848)
- Dysmachus bequaerti (Tomasovic, 2001)
- Dysmachus bidentatus (Becker, 1923)
- Dysmachus bilobus (Loew, 1871)
- Dysmachus bulbosus (Theodor, 1980)
- Dysmachus cephalenus (Loew, 1871)
- Dysmachus dasyproctus (Loew, 1871)
- Dysmachus dentiger (Richter, 1962)
- Dysmachus digitulus (Becker, 1923)
- Dysmachus echinurus (Richter, 1962)
- Dysmachus elapsus (Villeneuve, 1933)
- Dysmachus evanescens (Villeneuve, 1912)
- Dysmachus femoratellus (Loew, 1871)
- Dysmachus fraudator (Lehr, 1966)
- Dysmachus gratiosus (Richter, 1973)
- Dysmachus harpagonis (Séguy, 1929)
- Dysmachus hermonensis (Theodor, 1980)
- Dysmachus hiulcus (Pandellé, 1905)
- Dysmachus kasachstanicus (Lehr, 1966)
- Dysmachus kiritschenkoi (Lehr, 1966)
- Dysmachus kuznetzovi (Lehr, 1996)
- Dysmachus medius (Lehr, 1966)
- Dysmachus monticola (Lehr, 1966)
- Dysmachus montium (Richter, 1962)
- Dysmachus obtusus (Becker, 1923)
- Dysmachus olympicus (Janssens, 1958)
- Dysmachus ornatus (Theodor, 1980)
- Dysmachus putoni (Séguy, 1927)
- Dysmachus rectus (Becker, 1923)
- Dysmachus safranboluticus (Hasbenli & Geller-Grimm, 1999)
- Dysmachus schurovenkovi (Lehr, 1972)
- Dysmachus setiger (Loew, 1848)
- Dysmachus setipyga (Becker, 1923)
- Dysmachus strigitibia (Curran, 1931)
- Dysmachus suludereae (Hasbenli & Geller-Grimm, 1999)
- Dysmachus transcaucasicus (Richter, 1962)
- Dysmachus trilobus (Strobl, 1898)
- Dysmachus uschinskii (Lehr, 1966)
- Dysmachus zaitzevi (Lehr, 1996)
