= Dioctria pusio =

Scientific classification
- Domain: Eukaryota
- Kingdom: Animalia
- Phylum: Arthropoda
- Class: Insecta
- Order: Diptera
- Family: Asilidae
- Genus: Dioctria
- Species: D. pusio

Binomial name
- Dioctria pusio Osten Sacken, 1877

Species of fly

Dioctria pusio is a species of robber flies in the family Asilidae.
