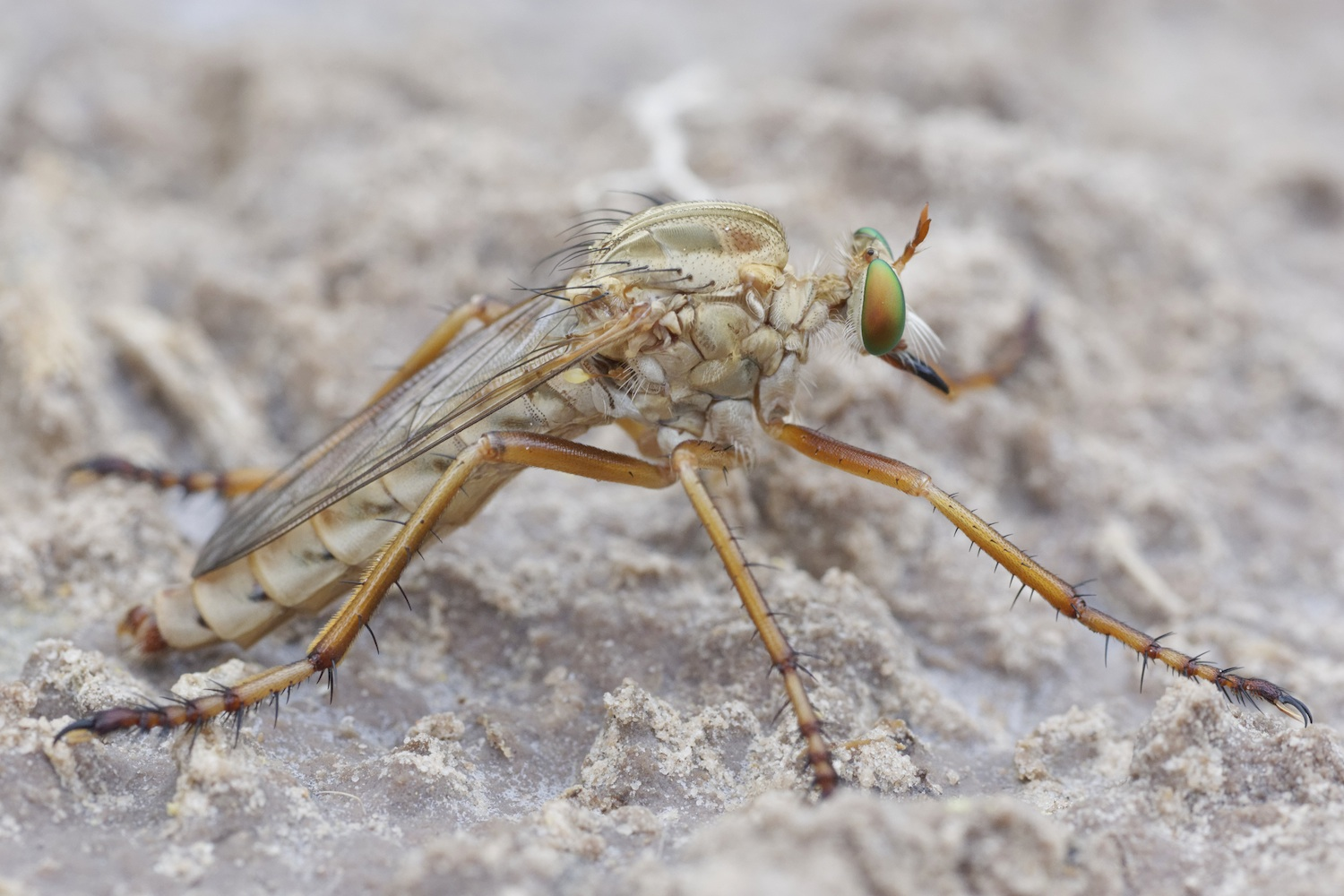
- A male of Diogmites angustipennis from eastern New Mexico

Scientific classification
- Domain: Eukaryota
- Kingdom: Animalia
- Phylum: Arthropoda
- Class: Insecta
- Order: Diptera
- Family: Asilidae
- Subfamily: Dasypogoninae
- Tribe: Dasypogonini
- Genus: Diogmites; Loew, 1866

Type species
- Diogmites platypterus Loew, 1866

Species
- Over 70, see text

= Diogmites =

Genus of flies

Diogmites is a genus of mainly neotropical flies in the family Asilidae or robber flies.

== Description ==
Medium to large-sized robber flies (17–48 mm) with mostly minute body hair, thoracal bristles are mostly confined to a row on the mesonotum and two bristles on the scutellum. The mystax is of relatively modest size and is made up of comparatively few bristles, which do not or barely overlap the beak in side view. The antennae have a relatively slender third article that forms over half of the antennal length and carries a single, minute apical hair. Face narrower than the width of one eye. Abdomen slender and sometimes slightly constricted, its posterior end reaches the wing tips or extends past these. Wings are usually clear or only slightly tinted. Body coloration often predominantly straw-yellowish to orange-reddish, in some species darker brown to black. Eye coloration of live animals often includes iridescent green.

Legs comparatively long with prominent bristles, the length of the hind legs often roughly equals the length of the entire body. Forelegs about two-thirds as long as hind legs, with a short but distinctive curved spine at the anterior edge of each tibia. The claws of the hind legs are less than twice as long as the pulvilli. As is typical for Dasypogoninae, the harder cuticle of the prosternum is separated from the neck by an area of flexible cuticle that presumably allows for greater freedom of movement of the forelegs. This feature also occurs in some members of other asilid subfamilies.

As with most asilids, known pupae of Diogmites species have prominent tooth- or hook-like anterior protrusions of the cuticle, which are technically referred to as antennal processes. In this genus there is one undivided pair of anterior antennal processes without any basal bristles, plus three posterior antennal processes

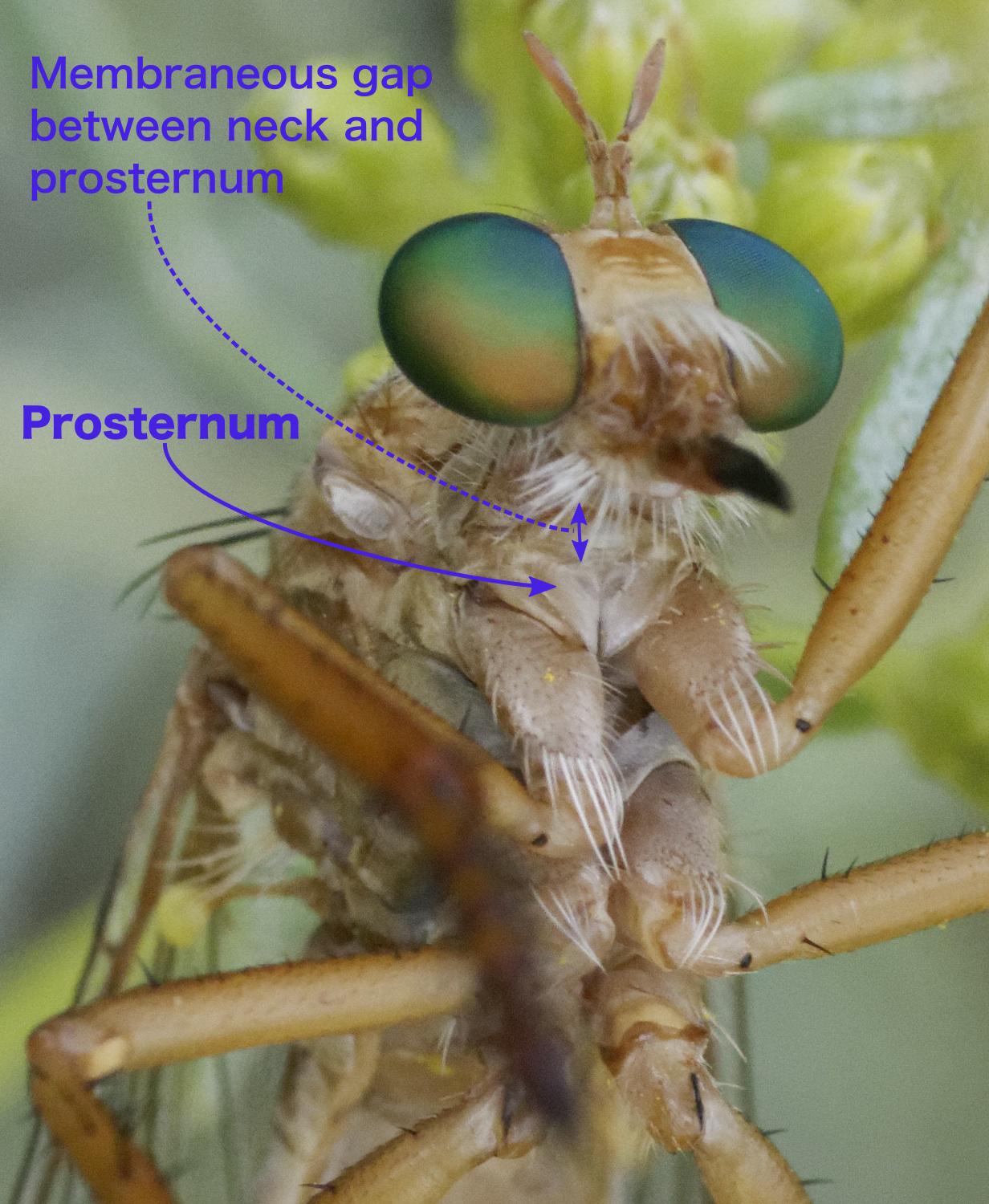
Ventral view of the prothorax in Diogmites angustipennis showing the reduced prosternum typical of the subfamily Dasypogoninae

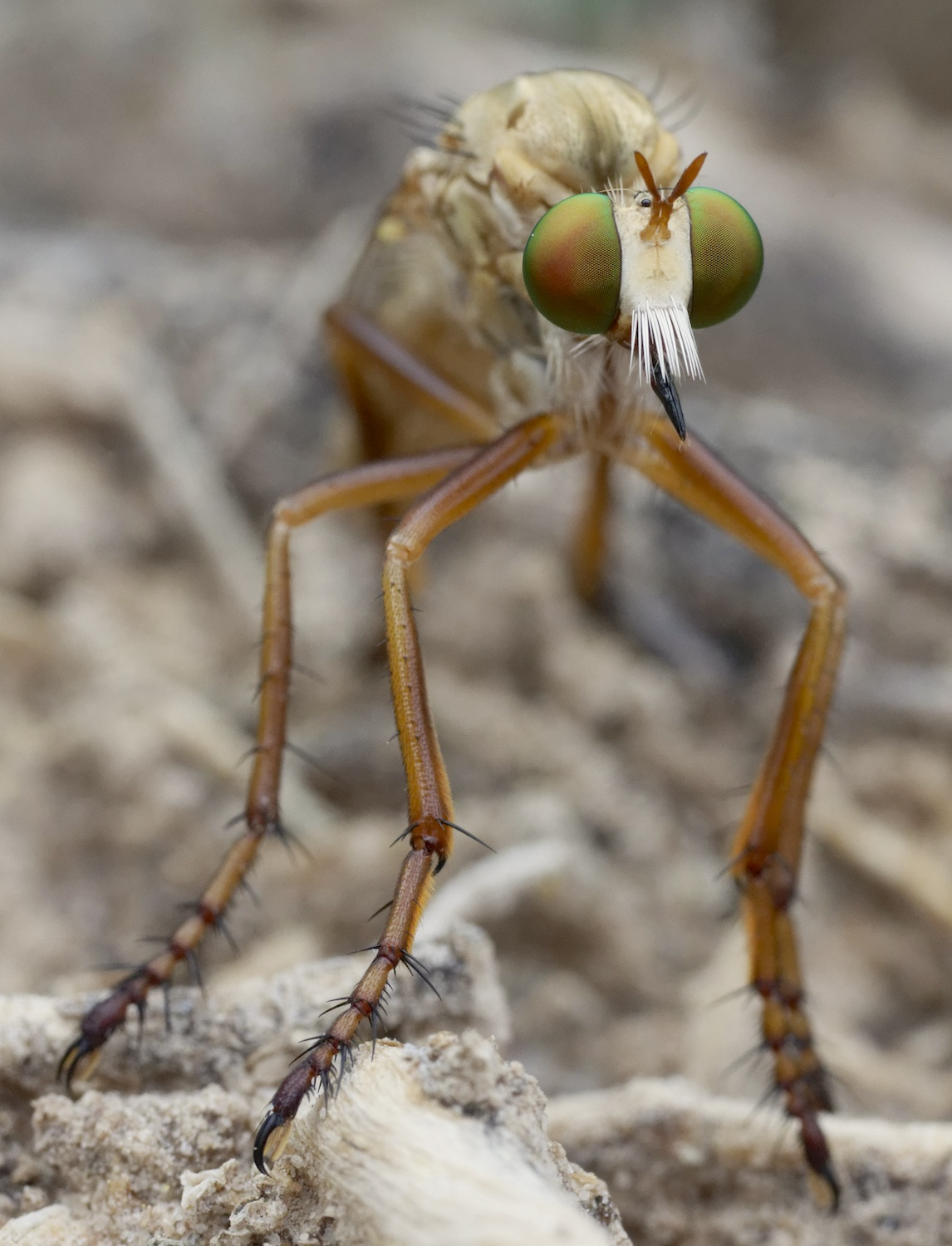
Front view of Diogmites angustipennis with claw-like spine at end of first tibia, a character typical for the genus. Another useful identifying character is the narrow face that is clearly less wide than each eye.

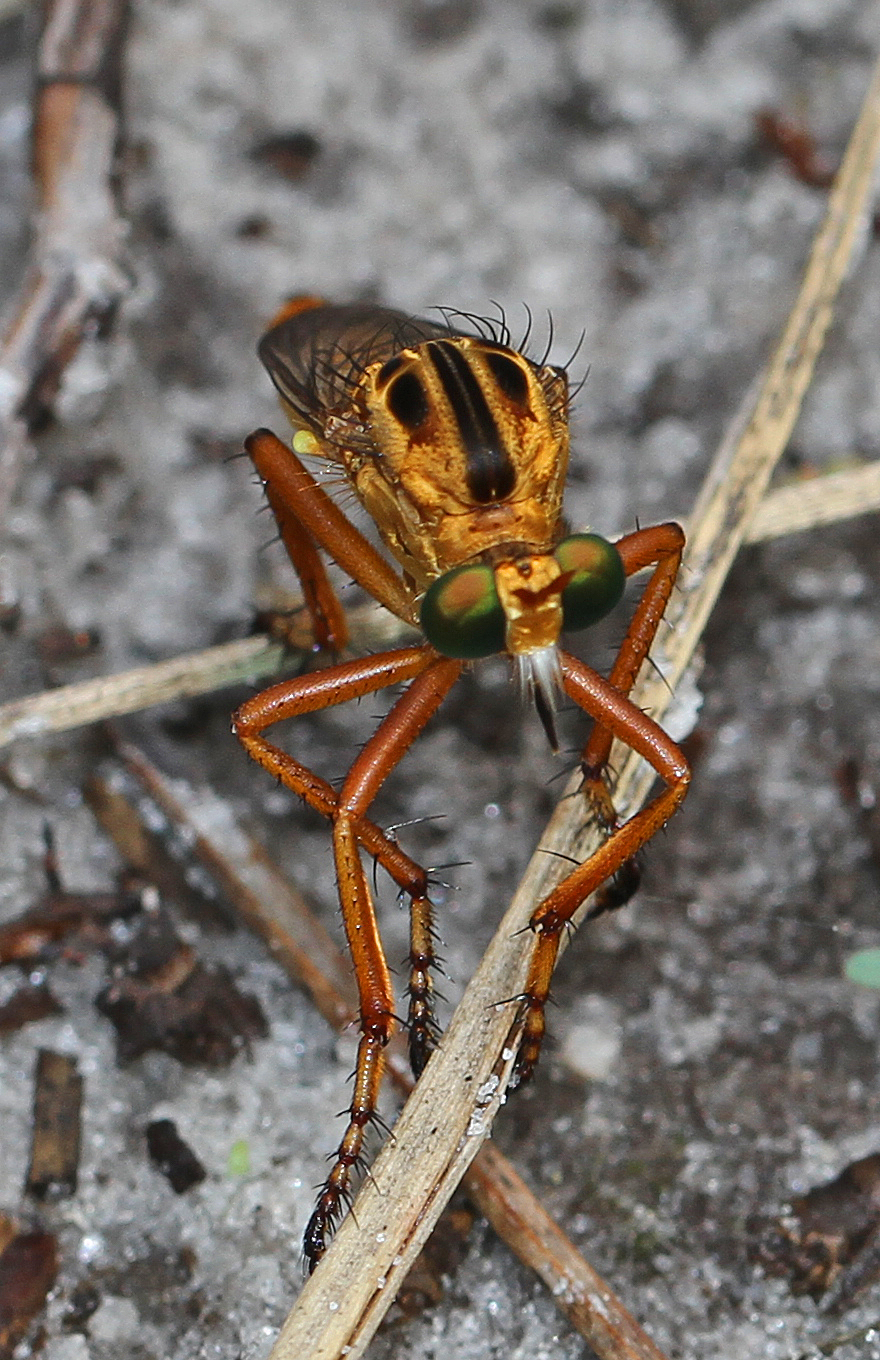
Hanging Thief - Diogmites properans from Okeefenokee Swamp National Wildlife Refuge, showing the tibial spine and narrow face typical for the genus

== Biology ==
Adults of Diogmites species hunt as ambush predators, taking off from a resting position on the ground or on branches to intercept other flying insects, or to pounce on perching/crawling prey. After prey capture, these flies will feed in a characteristic posture that has earned this genus the common name of Hanging Thieves: they will hang from plant stems or leaves suspended by one or both front legs, with the other legs holding and manipulating the prey while feeding. Presumably the relatively long legs and reduced prosternum of the genus are part of adaptations to facilitate feeding during this suspended posture.

Hanging thieves should not be confused with predatory scorpionflies of the family Bittacidae which are commonly called Hangingflies and which actually capture flying prey in a suspended posture.

Many observations of the suspended feeding posture of Diogmites were caught on camera, for example Herschel Raney's webpage for Dasypogoninae includes images of D. angustipennis, D. platypterus and D. missouriensis feeding on a variety of insects. Chris Thawley has an interesting video of a feeding adult manipulating a large prey wasp while in hanging posture. Observations of the moment of prey capture are unfortunately not recorded yet in any literature or web resources. Some species can assume an unusual flight posture, with the first and last leg pairs raised high while the middle legs are extended downwards (personal observation of low-flying D. angustipennis males and females in central New Mexico). This might represent a peculiar type of hunting-related behavior more commonly referred to as orientation flights, or perhaps might serve purposes unrelated to hunting, such as a defensive posture to reduce odds of capture by dragonflies or other robberflies, or behavior intended to facilitate latching onto plant stems and leaves for landing.

Robert Lavigne's Predator-Prey Database for the family Asilidae has 443 records of observations for at least 20 species of Diogmites feeding on a wide range of prey, including other asilids as well as dragonflies. Particular species can be selective in prey choice however, for example D. crudelis was observed to feed on Diptera or Hymenoptera in 89 of 93 cases. Very little is known about larval biology, but D. misellus and D. neoternatus larvae were respectively observed and surmised to feed on scarabaeid grubs. Larvae appear to live and pupate in soil, adults emerge after the pupae break through the soil surface to expose the anterior body. Whitney Cranshaw has captured emergence of an adult D. angustipennis in a series of remarkable photographs available at Zipcodezoo. Norman Lavers' Illustrated Field Guide to The Robber Flies of Crowley's Ridge, Arkansas details egg-laying behavior of D. platypterus and includes a more detailed photo of a protruding pupal cuticle.

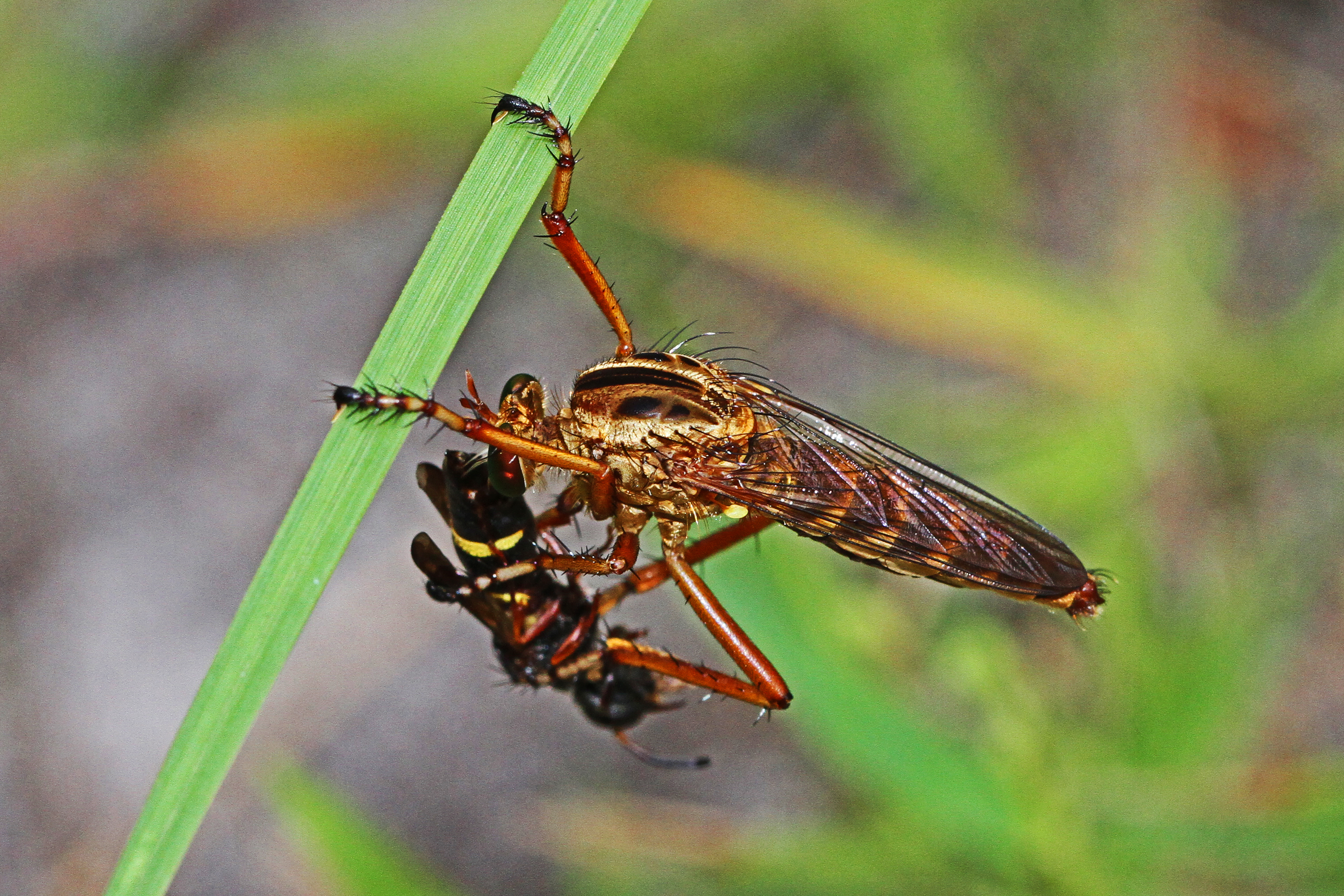
Diogmites properans (?) demonstrating the suspended feeding posture of a typical Hanging Thief

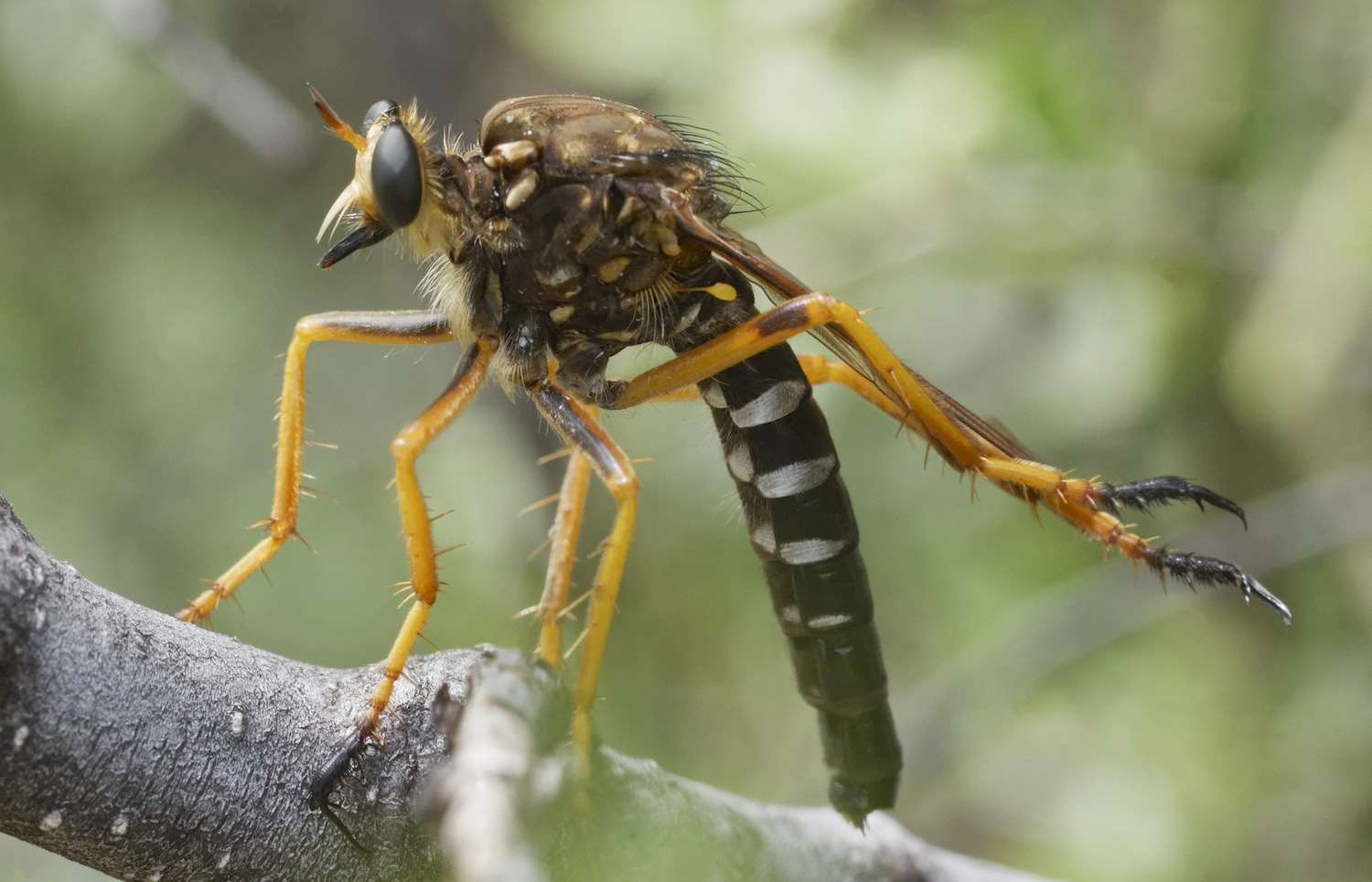
Compare and contrast: this looks like Diogmites but is actually an extra large Caenarolia species from central Argentina. Note absence of the tibial spine on forelegs and absence of pulvilli below the dagger-like tarsal claws.

== Taxonomy ==
Depending on the source, 73 to 77 species are currently recognized in Diogmites:

- Diogmites aberrans (Wiedemann, 1821)
- Diogmites affinis (Bellardi, 1861)
- Diogmites alvesi Carrera, 1949 the author for this species is not Curran, contrary to an erratum that was copied across multiple web databases
- Diogmites amethistinus Carrera, 1953
- Diogmites angustipennis Loew, 1866
- Diogmites atriapex Carrera, 1953 classified instead as Neodiogmites by Alvim et al (2014)
- Diogmites aureolus Carrera & Papavero, 1962
- Diogmites basalis (Walker, 1851)
- Diogmites bellardi (Bromley, 1929)
- Diogmites bicolor (Jaennicke, 1867)
- Diogmites bifasciatus Carrera, 1949
- Diogmites bilineatus (Loew, 1866)
- Diogmites bilobatus Barnes, 2010 classified instead as Leptogaster by geller-grimm.de but not GBIF
- Diogmites bimaculatus (Bromley, 1929)
- Diogmites bromleyi Carrera, 1949
- Diogmites brunneus (Fabricius, 1787)
- Diogmites castaneus (Macquart, 1838)
- Diogmites coffeatus (Wiedemann, 1819)
- Diogmites coloradensis (James, 1933)
- Diogmites contortus Bromley, 1936
- Diogmites craveri (Bellardi, 1861)
- Diogmites crudelis Bromley, 1936
- Diogmites cuantlensis (Bellardi, 1861)
- Diogmites discolor Loew, 1866
- Diogmites dubius (Bellardi, 1861)
- Diogmites duillius (Walker, 1849)
- Diogmites esuriens Bromley, 1936
- Diogmites fasciatus (Macquart, 1834)
- Diogmites ferrugineus (Lynch & Arribálzaga, 1880)
- Diogmites fragilis Bromley, 1936
- Diogmites goniostigma Bellardi, 1861
- Diogmites grossus (Bromley, 1936)
- Diogmites herennius (Walker, 1849)
- Diogmites heydenii (Jaennicke, 1867)
- Diogmites imitator Carrera, 1953
- Diogmites inclusus (Walker, 1851)
- Diogmites intactus (Wiedemann, 1828)
- Diogmites jalapensis Bellardi, 1861
- Diogmites lindigii (Schiner, 1868)
- Diogmites lineola (Bromley, 1934)
- Diogmites litoralis (Curran, 1930)
- Diogmites maculatus Curran, 1934
- Diogmites memnon Osten-Sacken, 1887
- Diogmites misellus Loew, 1866
- Diogmites missouriensis Bromley, 1951
- Diogmites neoternatus (Bromley, 1931)
- Diogmites nigripennis (Macquart, 1847)
- Diogmites nigripes (Bellardi, 1861)
- Diogmites nigritarsis (Macquart, 1846)
- Diogmites notatus Bigot, 1878 classified instead as Laphystia by geller-grimm.de but not GBIF
- Diogmites obscurus Carrera, 1949
- Diogmites perplexus Back, 1909
- Diogmites platypterus Loew, 1866
- Diogmites pritchardi Bromley, 1936
- Diogmites properans Bromley, 1936
- Diogmites pseudojalapensis (Bellardi, 1862)
- Diogmites pulcher (Back, 1909)
- Diogmites reticulatus (Fabricius, 1805)
- Diogmites rubescens (Bellardi, 1861)
- Diogmites rubrodorsatus (Artigas, 1966)
- Diogmites rufibasis Bigot, 1878
- Diogmites rufipalpis (Macquart, 1838)
- Diogmites sallei (Bellardi, 1861)
- Diogmites salutans Bromley, 1936
- Diogmites superbus Carrera, 1953
- Diogmites symmachus (Loew, 1872)
- Diogmites tau Osten-Sacken, 1887
- Diogmites teresita Lamas, 1972
- Diogmites ternatus Loew, 1866
- Diogmites texanus Bromley, 1934
- Diogmites tricolor (Bellardi, 1861)
- Diogmites unicolor Hull, 1958
- Diogmites virescens (Bellardi, 1861)
- Diogmites vulgaris Carrera, 1947
- Diogmites winthemi (Wiedemann, 1821)
- Diogmites wygodzinskyi Carrera, 1949

== Phylogeny ==
Although Diogmites is usually considered a member of the subfamily Dasypogoninae, combined analysis of morphological and molecular characters places Diogmites tristis in a clade corresponding to the subfamily Stenopogoninae instead, without however providing direct support for monophyly of this subfamily.
