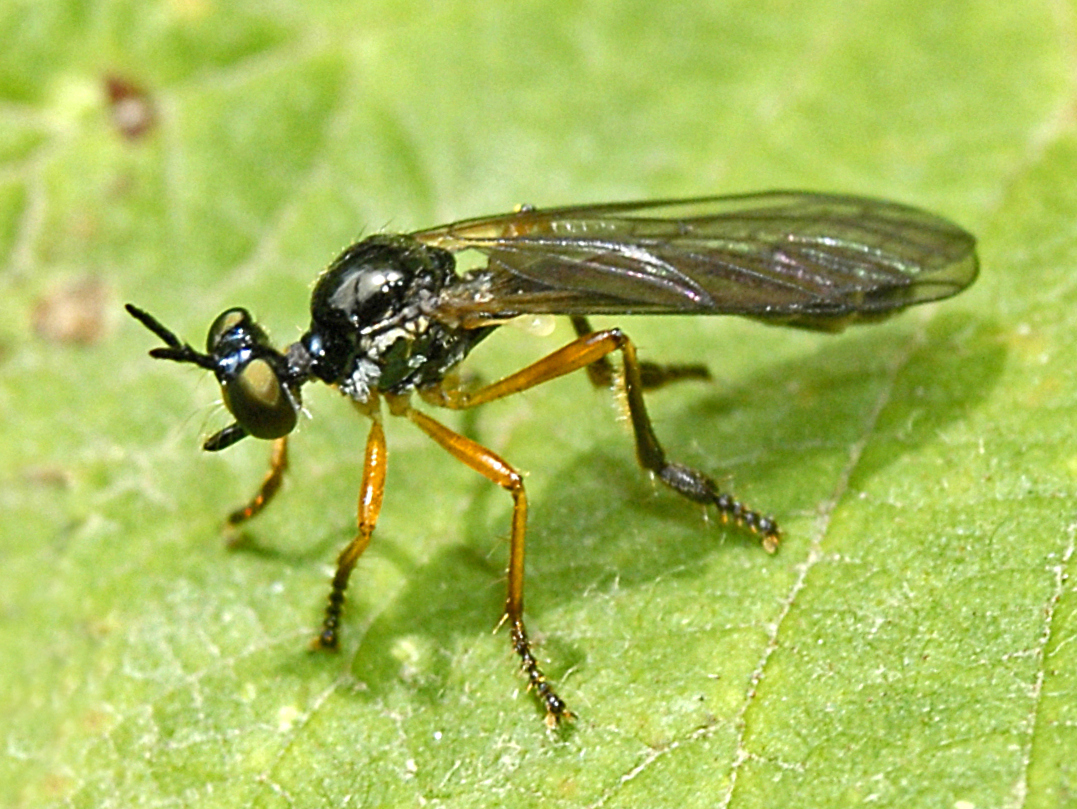

Scientific classification
- Kingdom: Animalia
- Phylum: Arthropoda
- Class: Insecta
- Order: Diptera
- Family: Asilidae
- Genus: Dioctria
- Species: D. bicincta

Binomial name
- Dioctria bicincta Meigen, 1820

Synonyms
- Dioctria infuscata Meigen, 1820

= Dioctria bicincta =

Species of fly

Dioctria bicincta is a species of robber fly classified in the subfamily Dasypogoninae of the family Asilidae.

Video clip

== Distribution ==
This species can be found in most of Europe (Austria, Belgium, Croatia, France, Germany, Greece, Italy, Poland, Spain, Switzerland, Netherlands and former Yugoslavia). It is not present in the British Islands.

== Description ==
Dioctria bicincta can reach a body length of about 7–9 mm (0.28–0.35 in). These robber flies have a more or less shiny black thorax. Also the abdomen is usually black, sometimes with partly reddish marks on the middle tergites. In males the hind metatarsi are very swollen. The front and middle tibia and femora are mainly yellowish. This species is rather similar to Dioctria linearis (drawing of the abdomen and color of the legs are almost identical) and to Dioctria gracilis (females of these two species cannot be easily separated).

== Biology ==
Adults can be found from the end of May to mid-July. These insects are predators on other insects that they hunt from leaves of bushes and trees.
