= Dicolonus =

Scientific classification
- Domain: Eukaryota
- Kingdom: Animalia
- Phylum: Arthropoda
- Class: Insecta
- Order: Diptera
- Family: Asilidae
- Subfamily: Stenopogoninae
- Genus: Dicolonus; Loew, 1866

Genus of flies

Dicolonus is a genus of robber flies in the family Asilidae. There are about five described species in Dicolonus.

== Species ==
These five species belong to the genus Dicolonus:

- Dicolonus argentatus Matsumura, 1916^{c g}
- Dicolonus medius Adisoemarto and Wood, 1975^{i c g}
- Dicolonus nigricentrus Adisoemarto and Wood, 1975^{i c g}
- Dicolonus simplex Loew, 1866^{i c g b}
- Dicolonus sparsipilosus Back, 1909^{i c g}

Data sources: i = ITIS, c = Catalogue of Life, g = GBIF, b = Bugguide.net
