= Dakinomyia froggattii =

Scientific classification
- Domain: Eukaryota
- Kingdom: Animalia
- Phylum: Arthropoda
- Class: Insecta
- Order: Diptera
- Family: Asilidae
- Genus: Dakinomyia
- Species: D. froggattii

Binomial name
- Dakinomyia froggattii Dakin & Fordham, 1922

Species of fly

Dakinomyia froggattii is a species of fly in the family Asilidae. Dakinomyia froggattii was described in 1922 by Dakin & Fordham. This species is found in the Australasian realm of Western Australia and South Australia.
