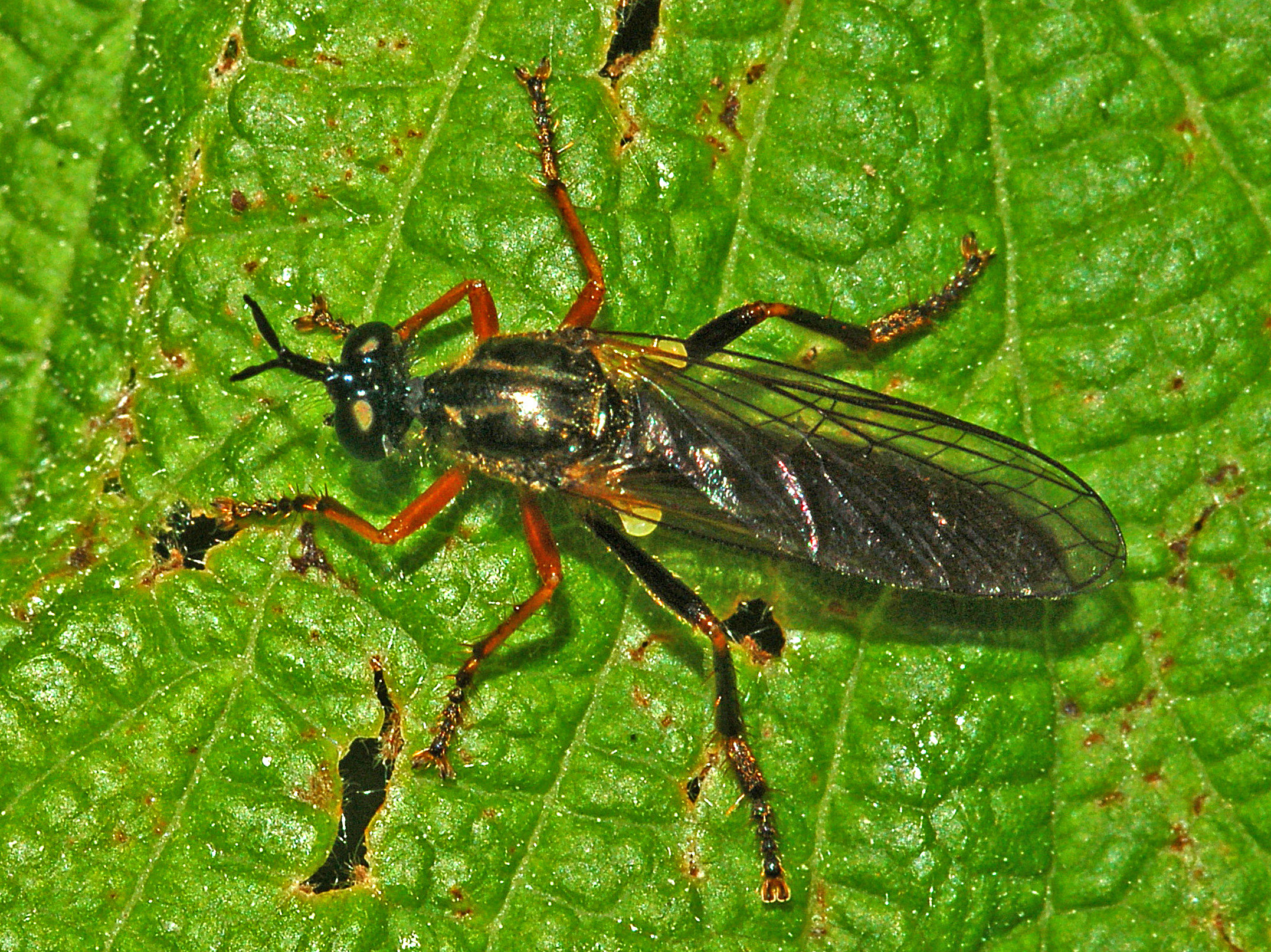
- Dioctria rufipes

Scientific classification
- Domain: Eukaryota
- Kingdom: Animalia
- Phylum: Arthropoda
- Class: Insecta
- Order: Diptera
- Family: Asilidae
- Subfamily: Dasypogoninae
- Tribe: Dioctriini
- Genus: Dioctria; Meigen, 1803

= Dioctria =

Genus of flies

Dioctria is a genus of robber fly classified in the subfamily Dasypogoninae in the family Asilidae. Together with the genus Bohartia, Dicolonus, Echthodopa, Eudioctria and Metadioctria it forms the tribe Dioctriini.

== Species ==
Species include:

- D. annulata Meigen, 1820
- D. arthritica Loew, 1871
- D. atricapilla Meigen, 1804
- D. berlandi Séguy, 1927
- D. bicincta Meigen, 1820
- D. bigoti A. Costa, 1884
- D. bulgarica Hradský & Moucha, 1964
- D. caesia Wiedemann, 1818
- D. calceata Meigen, 1820
- D. claripennis Villeneuve, 1908
- D. conspicua Becker, 1923
- D. contraria Becker, 1923
- D. cothurnata Meigen, 1820
- D. cretensis Becker, 1923
- D. engeli Noskiewicz, 1953
- D. flavicincta Meigen, 1820
- D. flavipennis Meigen, 1820
- D. fuscipes Macquart, 1834
- D. gagates Wiedemann in Meigen, 1820
- D. gracilis Meigen, 1820
- D. harcyniae Loew, 1844
- D. humeralis Zeller, 1840
- D. hyalipennis (Fabricius, 1794)
- D. kowarzi Frivaldszky, 1877
- D. lata Loew, 1853
- D. lateralis Meigen, 1804
- D. linearis (Fabricius, 1787)
- D. liturata Loew, 1873
- D. longicornis Meigen, 1820
- D. meridionalis Bezzi, 1898
- D. meyeri Nowicki, 1867
- D. mixta Becker, 1923
- D. navasi Séguy, 1929
- D. nigribarba Loew, 1871
- D. oelandica (Linnaeus, 1758)
- D. pollinosa Loew, 1870
- D. puerilis Becker, 1923
- D. rufa Strobl, 1906
- D. rufipes (De Geer, 1776)
- D. rufithorax Loew, 1853
- D. speculifrons Wiedemann, 1820
- D. sudetica Duda, 1940
- D. wiedemanni Meigen, 1820

== Gallery ==
Dioctria hyalipennis

Dioctria linearis

Dioctria rufipes
