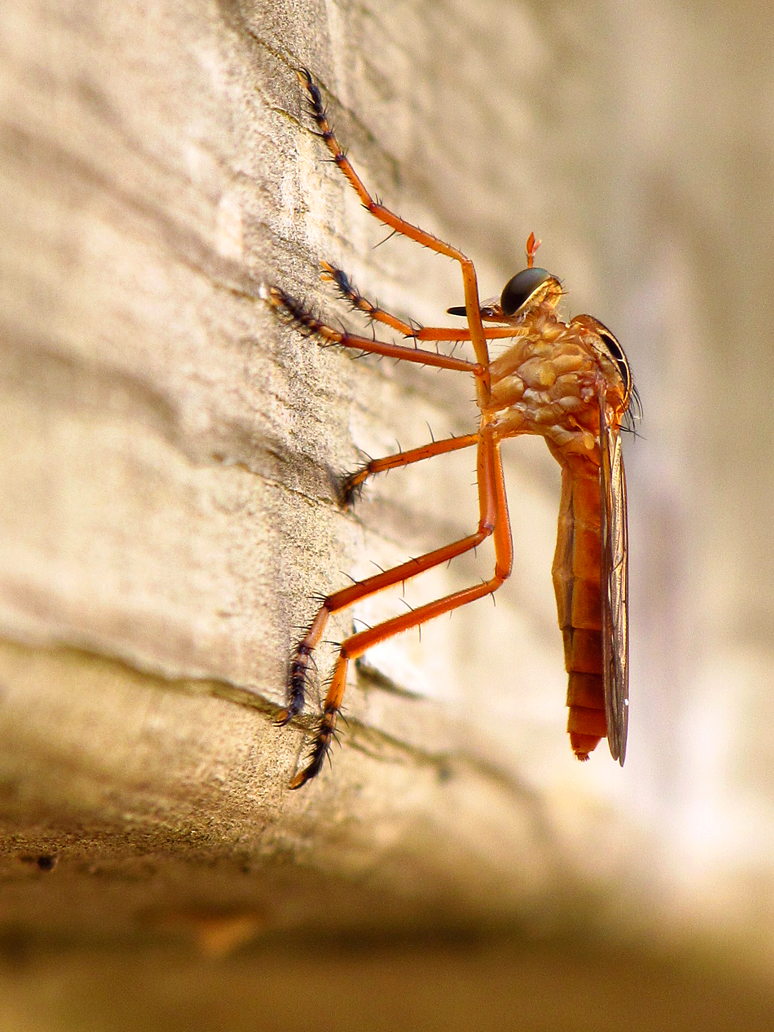

Scientific classification
- Kingdom: Animalia
- Phylum: Arthropoda
- Clade: Pancrustacea
- Class: Insecta
- Order: Diptera
- Family: Asilidae
- Genus: Diogmites
- Species: D. neoternatus

Binomial name
- Diogmites neoternatus (Bromley, 1951)

Synonyms
- Deromyia neoternata Bromley, 1931

= Diogmites neoternatus =

Species of fly

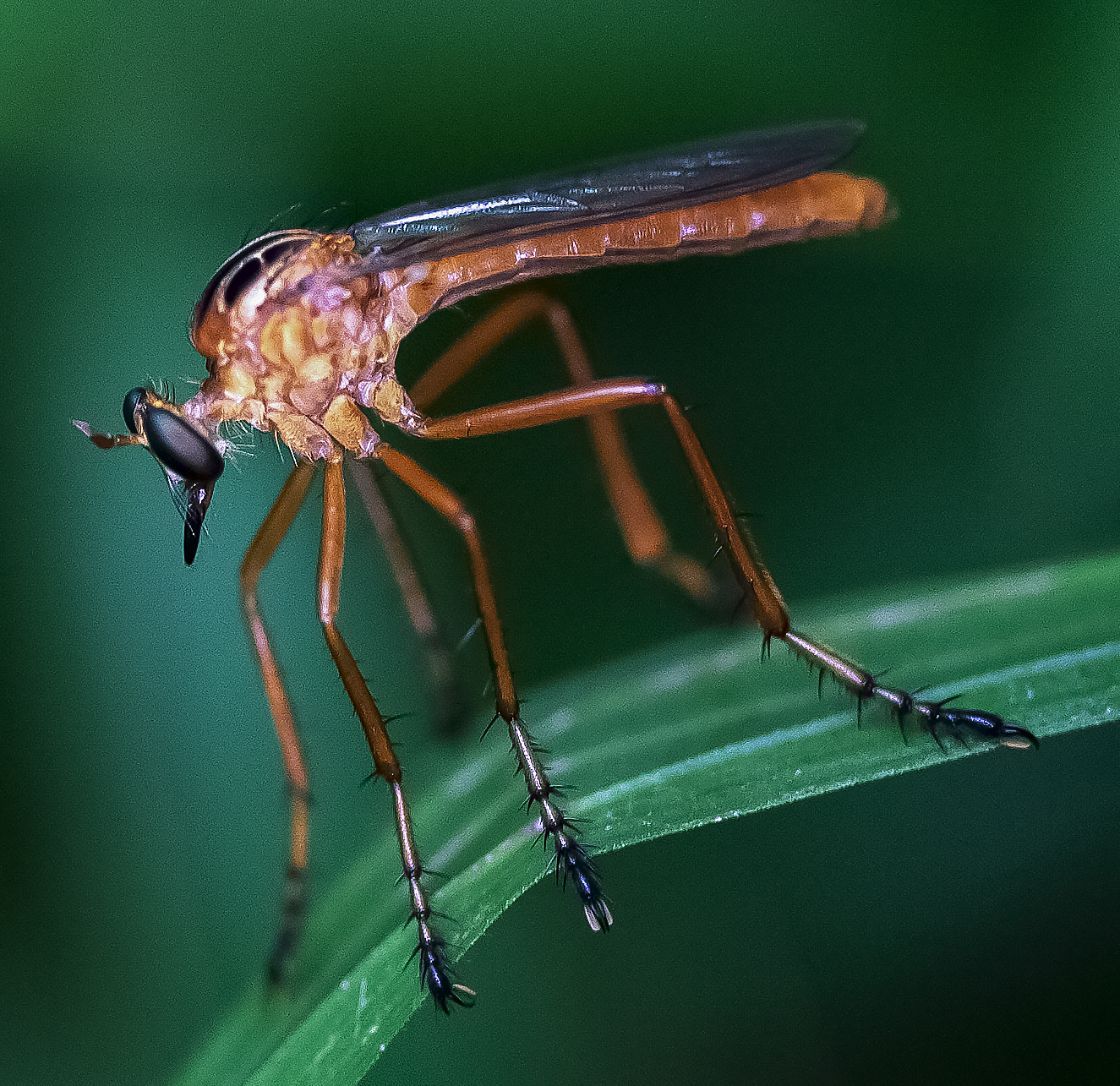
Hanging Thief Diogmites neoternatus

Diogmites neoternatus, the plain tailed hanging thief, is a species of robber fly in the family Asilidae. Its genus name, Diogmites, refers to the peculiar habit of hanging by its foreleg while consuming prey.

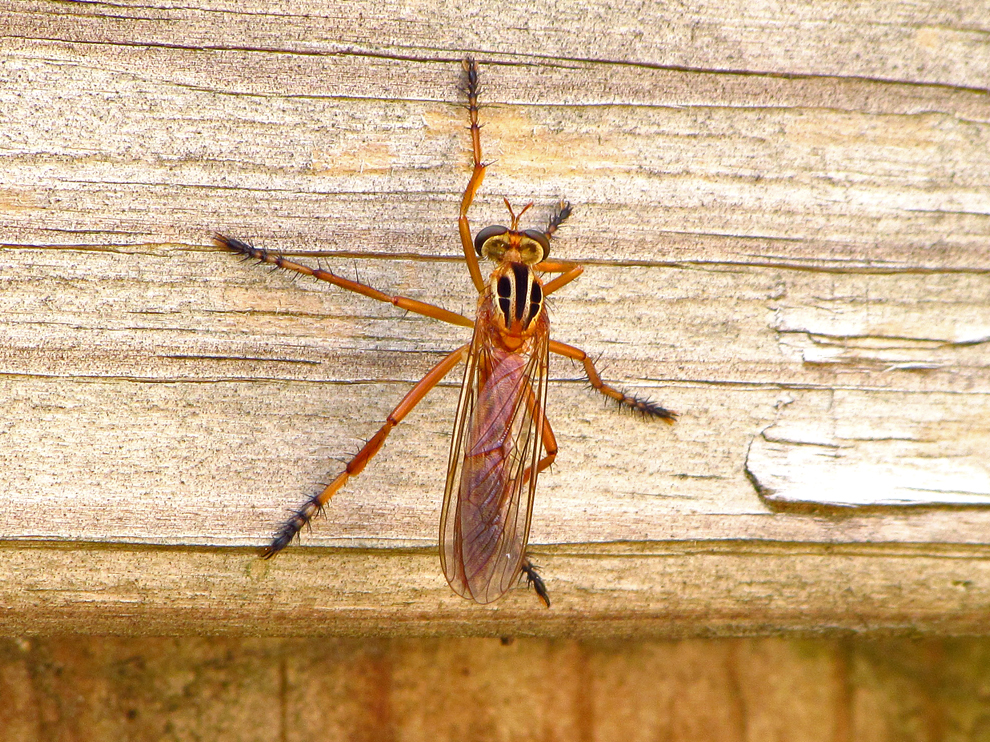
