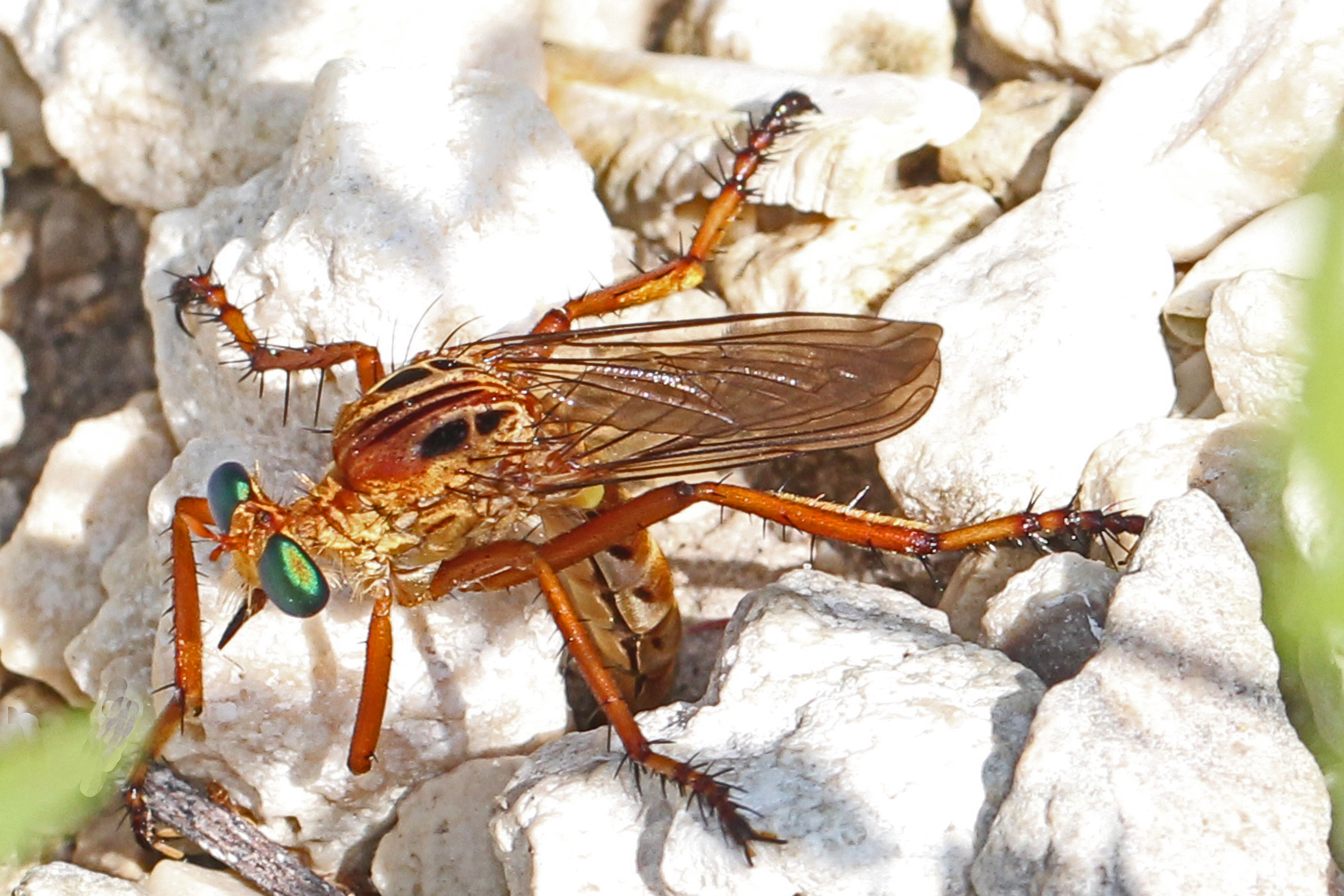
- Hanging-thief Robber Fly - Diogmites esuriens? - Merritt Island National Wildlife Refuge, Florida.

Scientific classification
- Domain: Eukaryota
- Kingdom: Animalia
- Phylum: Arthropoda
- Class: Insecta
- Order: Diptera
- Family: Asilidae
- Genus: Diogmites
- Species: D. esuriens

Binomial name
- Diogmites esuriens Bromley, 1936

Synonyms
- Diogmites rubrodorsatus Artigas, 1966

= Diogmites esuriens =

Species of fly

Diogmites esuriens is a species of robber flies in the family Asilidae.
