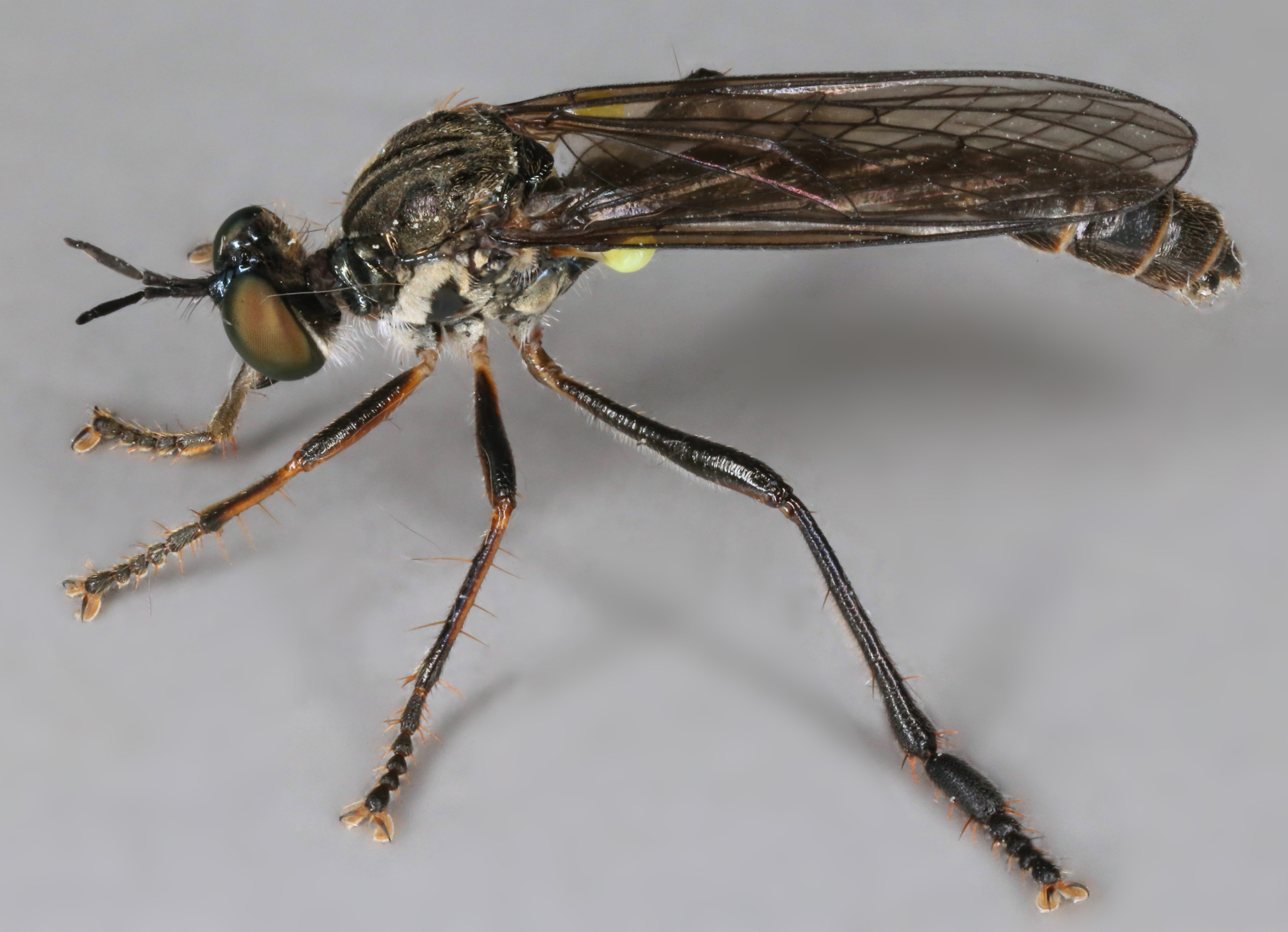
- Dioctria hyalipennis as Dioctria baumhaueri, Marford Quarry, North Wales

Scientific classification
- Kingdom: Animalia
- Phylum: Arthropoda
- Clade: Pancrustacea
- Class: Insecta
- Order: Diptera
- Family: Asilidae
- Genus: Dioctria
- Species: D. hyalipennis

Binomial name
- Dioctria hyalipennis (Fabricius, 1794)

Synonyms
- Dioctria baumhaueri Meigen, 1820

= Dioctria hyalipennis =

Species of fly

Dioctria hyalipennis is a Holarctic species of robber fly in the family Asilidae.

== Description ==
10 to 14 mm. The upper head and vertex are shiny black. The lower face has a silvery-white pile. The mystax is white and the short proboscis black. The antennae appears Y-shaped with the segments about equal in length. They are black with short black hair. The neck is obvious and the thorax is raised or humped. It is black with two long indented lines and a faint covering of light yellow pile. Segment 2 (scutellum) is small with a line of yellow pile at the base. The thorax sides have a wide stripe of whitish pollen extending along the thorax down to the front leg. The wings are hyaline, but appear darker when folded over the body. The veins are brown. Halteres light yellow. The front and middle legs are mostly yellow with black streaks on the top side and dark tips. The feet are black with grey piles and yellow spines and toes. The hind legs are black with a swollen 1st foot segment. The abdomen is shining black. The lower margin of segments has a thin whitish line. The first 4 male segments are very narrow and constricted (appear wavy); the last few segments gradually widen to the tip. Female abdomen flat on top side, rounded and orange on the underside; much wider and thicker than male, but shorter.

== Identification ==
Difficult to distinguish from other Dioctria. Wolff, Gebel and Geller-Grimm (2021), Majer (1997), van den Broek (1979), Stubbs and Drake (2001) all provide keys, descriptions and illustrations. Older works are also useful eg. Seguy (1920), Verrall (1909), Oldroyd (1969).

=== Similar species ===
Eudioctria albius male has all dark legs.

== Biology ==
The habitats include meadows, hedgerows, forest and field edges with large shrubs and spruce or cedar trees. Adults feed on mostly small wasps and bees like the Lasioglossum and Hylaeus. Also reported feeding on small Diptera and pygmy grasshoppers Tetrigidae. Flies May to July

== Synonyms and types ==
Dioctria anomala, Dioctria flavipes, Dioctria frontalis, Dioctria varipes, Dioctria baumhaueri, Dioctria strandi

- Holotype as Asilus hyalipennis by Fabricius, 1794. Type Locality: Denmark. Fabricius’ collection is in the University of Copenhagen Zoological Museum, Copenhagen, Denmark.
- Holotype as Dioctria anomala by Macquart, 1826. Type Locality: Unknown. Many Macquart types are in Bigot's collection which is divided between the University Museum at Oxford and the British Museum of Natural History, London, England. Also, Macquart types are scattered among a number of museums, with his personal collection deposited in Lille.
- Holotype as Dioctria flavipes by Meigen, 1804. Type Locality: Netherlands. Baumhauer's collection is split between the Liege and the Leiden Museum, Netherlands.
- Holotype as Dioctria frontalis by Meigen, 1804. Type Locality: Unknown. Most of the Meigen collection is now in the Museum National d'Histoire Naturelle in Paris, France.
- Holotype as Dioctria varipes by Meigen, 1820. Type Locality: Unknown. Most of the Meigen collection is now in the Museum National d'Histoire Naturelle in Paris, France.
- Holotype as Dioctria baumhaueri by Meigen, 1820. Type Locality: Netherlands. Baumhauer's collection is split between the Liege and the Leiden Museum, Netherlands.
- Holotype as Dioctria strandi by Duda, 1940. Type Locality: Unknown. Museum unknown.

== Notes ==
Introduced to Boston, Massachusetts area around 1916 from England.
