= Diogmites sallei =

Scientific classification
- Kingdom: Animalia
- Phylum: Arthropoda
- Clade: Pancrustacea
- Class: Insecta
- Order: Diptera
- Family: Asilidae
- Genus: Diogmites
- Species: D. sallei

Binomial name
- Diogmites sallei (Bellardi, 1861)

Synonyms
- Dasypogon sallei Bellardi, 1861

Species of fly

Diogmites sallei is a species of robber flies in the family Asilidae.
