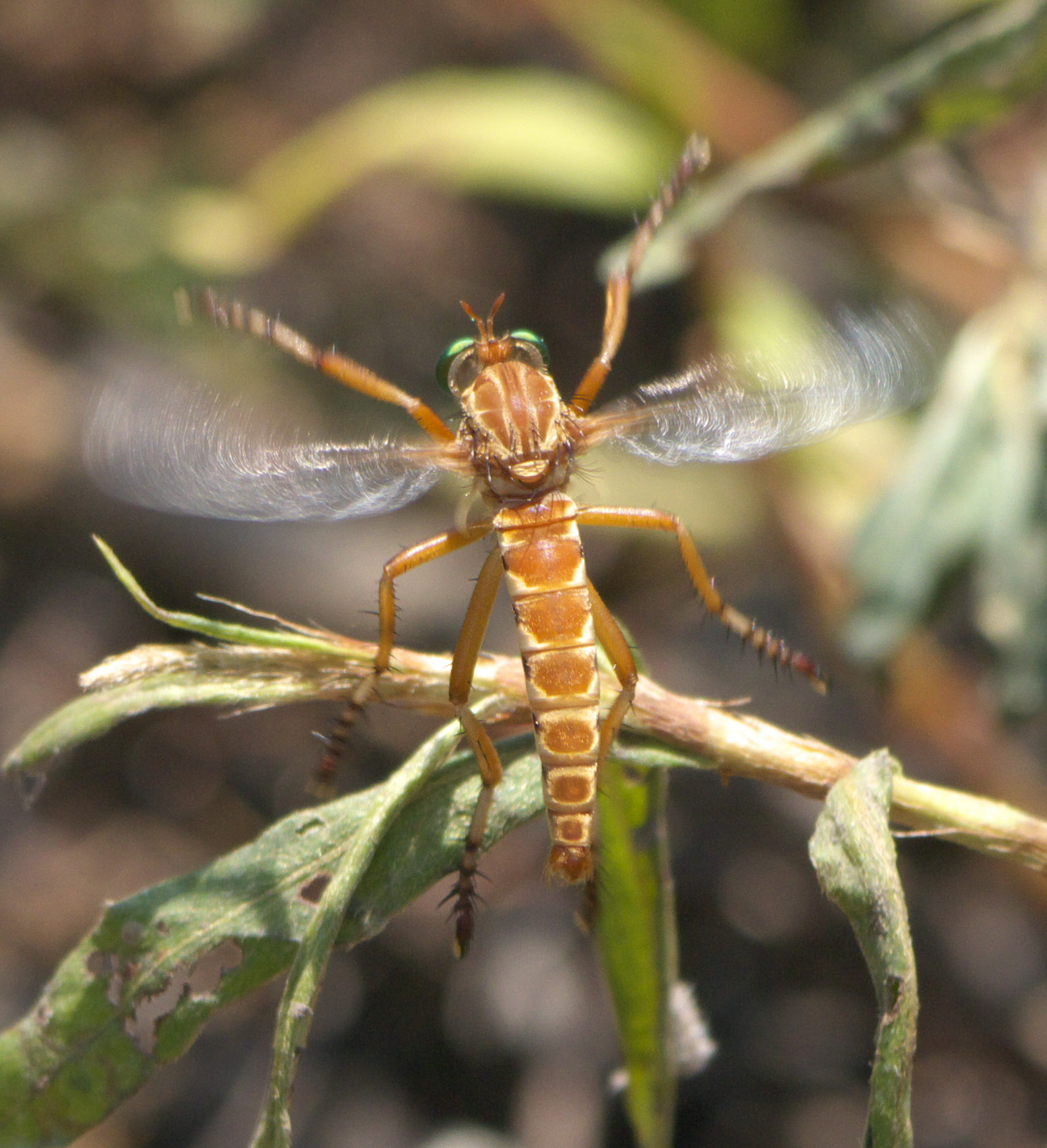

Scientific classification
- Domain: Eukaryota
- Kingdom: Animalia
- Phylum: Arthropoda
- Class: Insecta
- Order: Diptera
- Family: Asilidae
- Genus: Diogmites
- Species: D. angustipennis

Binomial name
- Diogmites angustipennis Loew, 1866

= Diogmites angustipennis =

Species of fly

Diogmites angustipennis, commonly known as the prairie robber fly, is a species of robber flies in the family Asilidae.

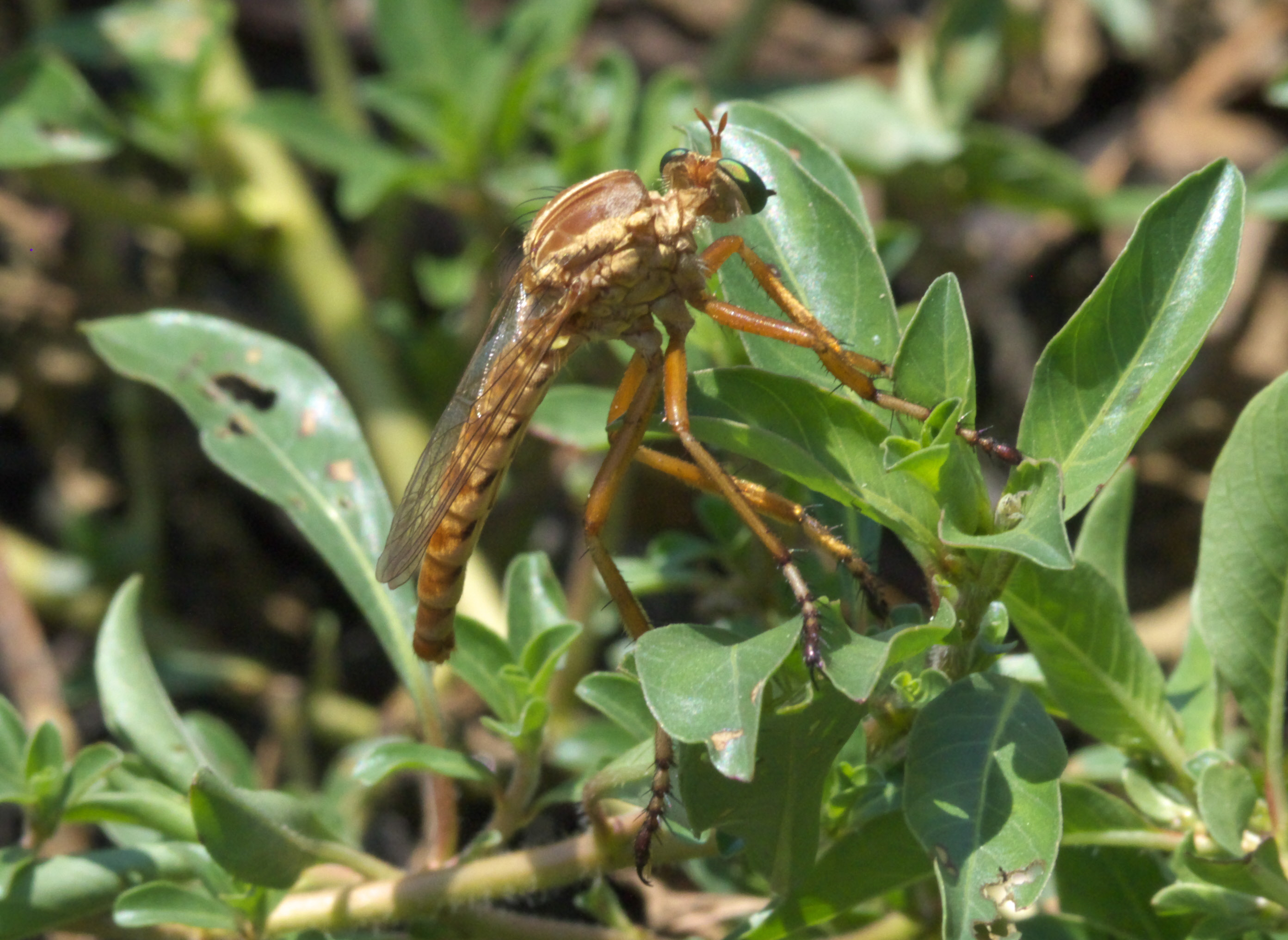
Prairie robber fly, Diogmites angustipennis
