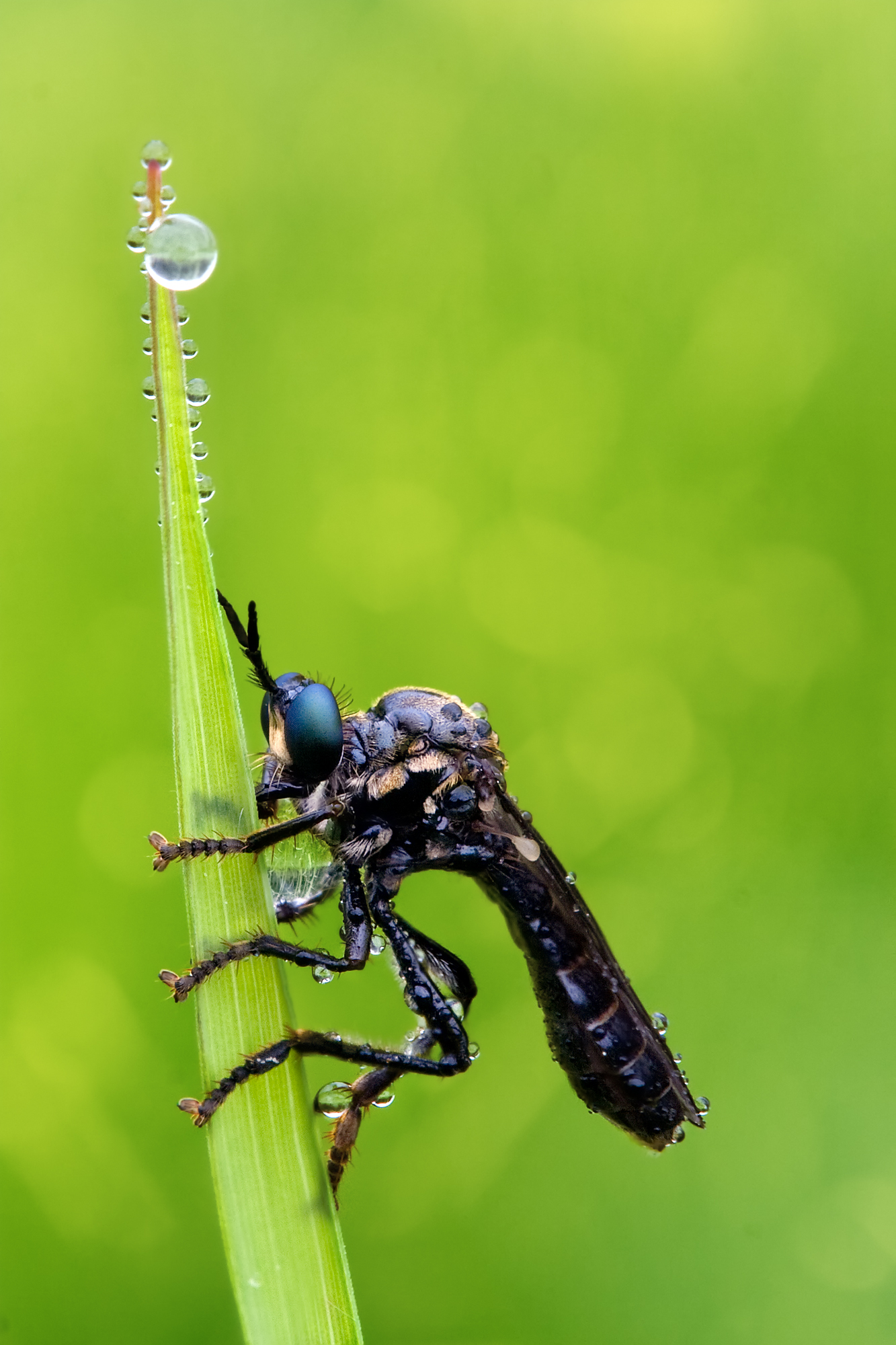

Scientific classification
- Kingdom: Animalia
- Phylum: Arthropoda
- Clade: Pancrustacea
- Class: Insecta
- Order: Diptera
- Family: Asilidae
- Genus: Dioctria
- Species: D. atricapilla

Binomial name
- Dioctria atricapilla Meigen, 1804

Synonyms
- Dioctria fuscipennis Fallén, 1814

= Dioctria atricapilla =

Species of fly

D. atricapilla in copula

Dioctria atricapilla, the violet black-legged robber fly, is a species of robber fly in the subfamily Dasypogoninae. This 9- to 12-millimeter long insect has a wingspan of roughly 7 to 9 mm and short, three-segmented antennae. It's a predatory insect, feeding mainly on smaller flies and predatory hymenopterans. It primarily thrives in grassland, and is seen from May to July.

== Habitat and behavior ==
Like all robber flies, the violet black-legged robber fly feed by perching on lower stems of grasses and attack prey as it flies by. The larvae usually grow up in dung piles or decaying organic matter, but they can also be in regular soil.

Courting behavior involves the male leading the courtship dance in front of the female. If she isn't impressed, she'll rapidly move her wings or fly away; otherwise the male will begin copulating.

== Natural status ==
There are 24 locations in the United Kingdom where it's a protected species, mostly in England. It can be found throughout European and east Palearctic grasslands.

== Identification ==
Difficult to distinguish from other Dioctria. Wolff, Gebel and Geller-Grimm (2021), (Majer (1997), van den Broek (1979), Stubbs and Drake (2001) all provide keys, descriptions and illustrations. Older works are also useful eg. Seguy (1920)
