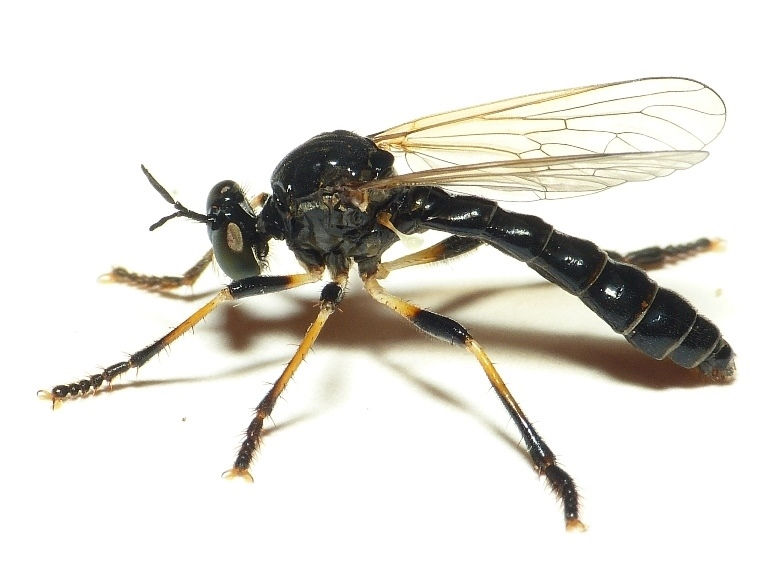
- Dioctria cothurnata Wageningen, The Netherlands

Scientific classification
- Kingdom: Animalia
- Phylum: Arthropoda
- Clade: Pancrustacea
- Class: Insecta
- Order: Diptera
- Family: Asilidae
- Genus: Dioctria
- Species: D. cothurnata

Binomial name
- Dioctria cothurnata Meigen, 1820

= Dioctria cothurnata =

Species of fly

Dioctria cothurnata is a Palearctic species of robber fly in the family Asilidae.

== Identification ==
Difficult to distinguish from other Dioctria. Wolff, Gebel and Geller-Grimm (2021), ( Majer (1997), van den Broek (1979), Stubbs and Drake (2001) all provide keys, descriptions and illustrations. Older works are also useful eg. Seguy (1920)
