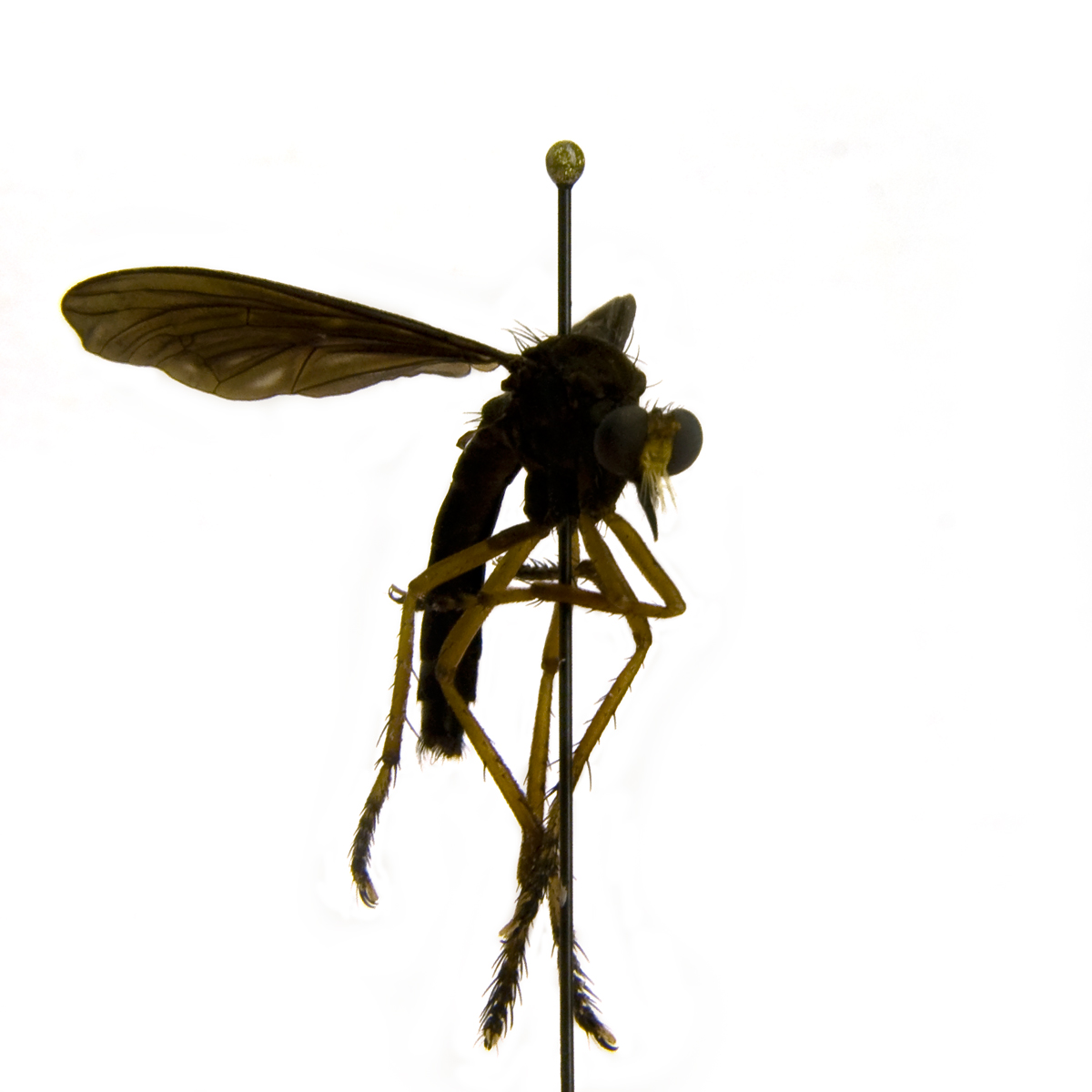

Scientific classification
- Kingdom: Animalia
- Phylum: Arthropoda
- Clade: Pancrustacea
- Class: Insecta
- Order: Diptera
- Family: Asilidae
- Genus: Diogmites
- Species: D. platypterus

Binomial name
- Diogmites platypterus Loew, 1866

= Diogmites platypterus =

Species of fly

Diogmites platypterus, also known as the Black Hanging Thief, is a species of robber fly in the family Asilidae. This species of robber fly is dark brown to black, has a slender body, and broad wings. The wings of this species are darker, wider, and longer than any other species within the genus.

== Range ==
Diogmites platypterus can be found in the eastern United States. While more common within the midwest and south, there are a few records of the species as far east as Georgia and South Carolina.
