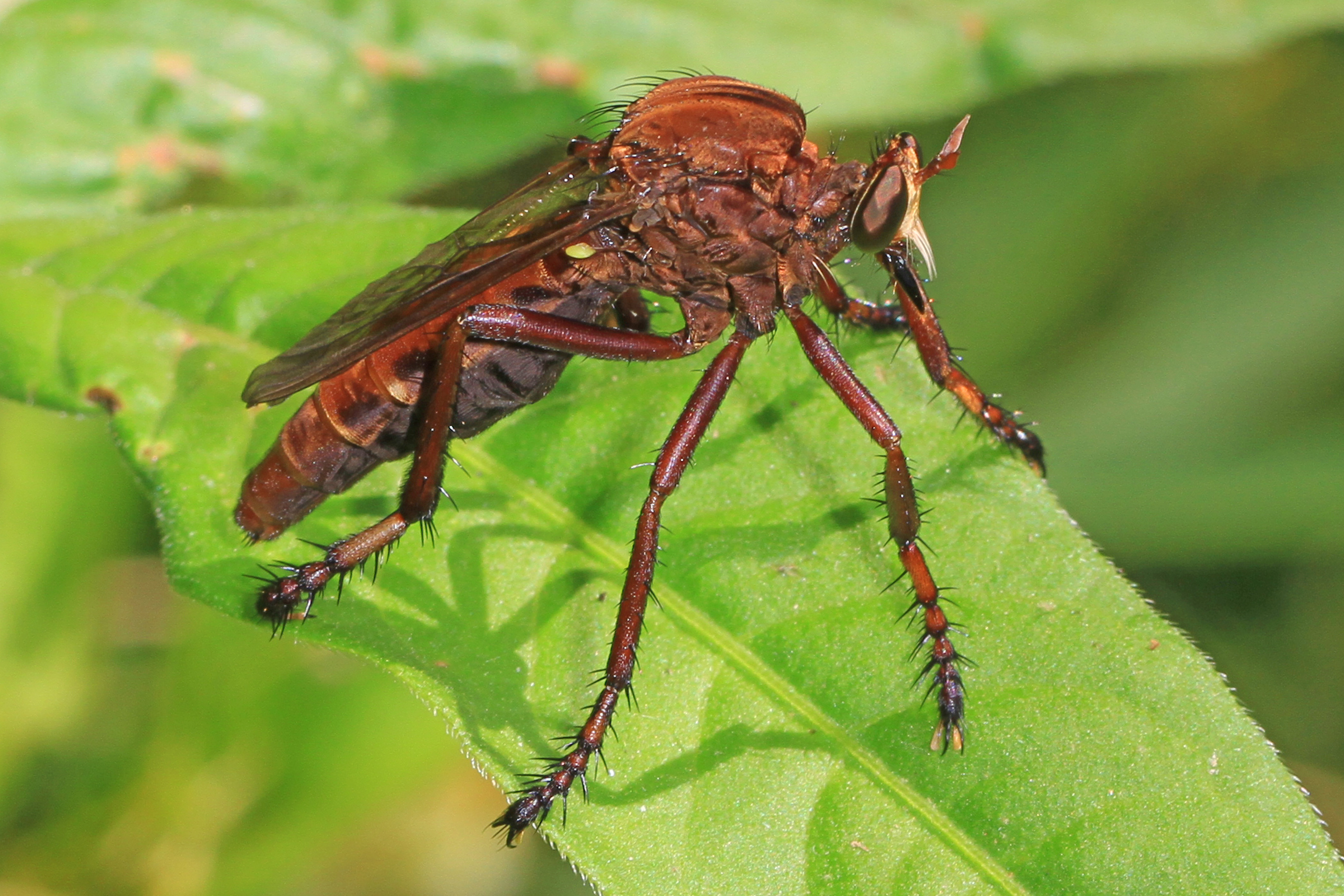

Scientific classification
- Kingdom: Animalia
- Phylum: Arthropoda
- Class: Insecta
- Order: Diptera
- Family: Asilidae
- Genus: Diogmites
- Species: D. basalis

Binomial name
- Diogmites basalis (Walker, 1851)

Synonyms
- Dasypogon basalis Walker, 1851; Diogmites umbrinus Loew, 1866

= Diogmites basalis =

Species of fly

Diogmites basalis, the New York bee killer, is a species of robber flies in the family Asilidae.
