= Diogmites ternatus =

Scientific classification
- Domain: Eukaryota
- Kingdom: Animalia
- Phylum: Arthropoda
- Class: Insecta
- Order: Diptera
- Family: Asilidae
- Genus: Diogmites
- Species: D. ternatus

Binomial name
- Diogmites ternatus Loew, 1866

Species of fly

Diogmites ternatus is a species of robber flies in the family Asilidae.
