= Dicolonus simplex =

Scientific classification
- Domain: Eukaryota
- Kingdom: Animalia
- Phylum: Arthropoda
- Class: Insecta
- Order: Diptera
- Family: Asilidae
- Genus: Dicolonus
- Species: D. simplex

Binomial name
- Dicolonus simplex Loew, 1866

Species of fly

Dicolonus simplex is a species of robber flies in the family Asilidae.
