= Diogmites texanus =

Scientific classification
- Domain: Eukaryota
- Kingdom: Animalia
- Phylum: Arthropoda
- Class: Insecta
- Order: Diptera
- Family: Asilidae
- Genus: Diogmites
- Species: D. texanus

Binomial name
- Diogmites texanus Bromley, 1934

Species of fly

Diogmites texanus is a species of robber flies in the family Asilidae.
