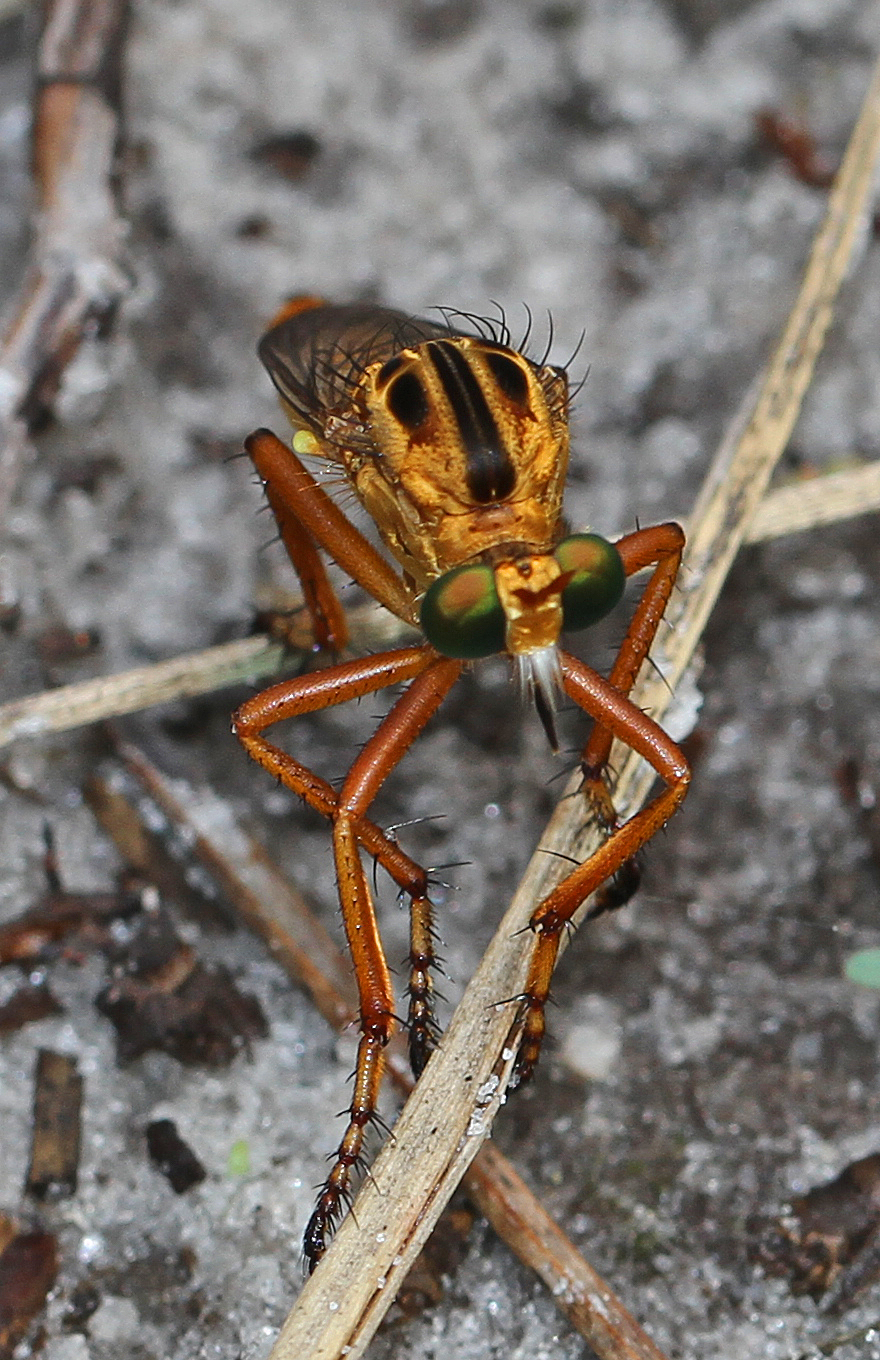

Scientific classification
- Domain: Eukaryota
- Kingdom: Animalia
- Phylum: Arthropoda
- Class: Insecta
- Order: Diptera
- Family: Asilidae
- Genus: Diogmites
- Species: D. properans

Binomial name
- Diogmites properans Bromley, 1936

= Diogmites properans =

Species of fly

Diogmites properans is a species of robber flies in the family Asilidae.
