= Diogmites misellus =

Scientific classification
- Domain: Eukaryota
- Kingdom: Animalia
- Phylum: Arthropoda
- Class: Insecta
- Order: Diptera
- Family: Asilidae
- Genus: Diogmites
- Species: D. misellus

Binomial name
- Diogmites misellus Loew, 1866

Species of fly

Diogmites misellus is a species of robber flies in the family Asilidae.
