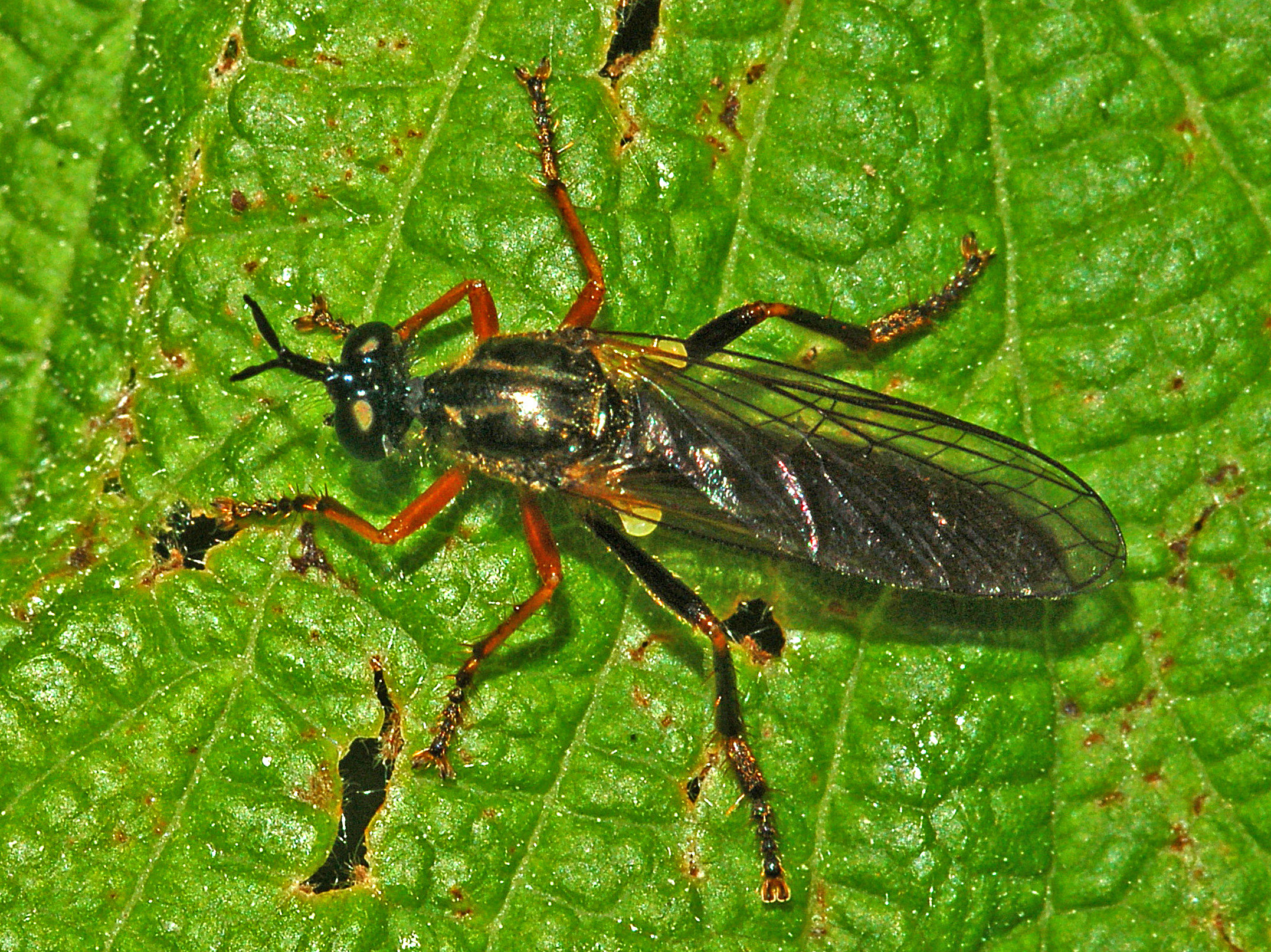
- Dioctria rufipes female, dorsal view
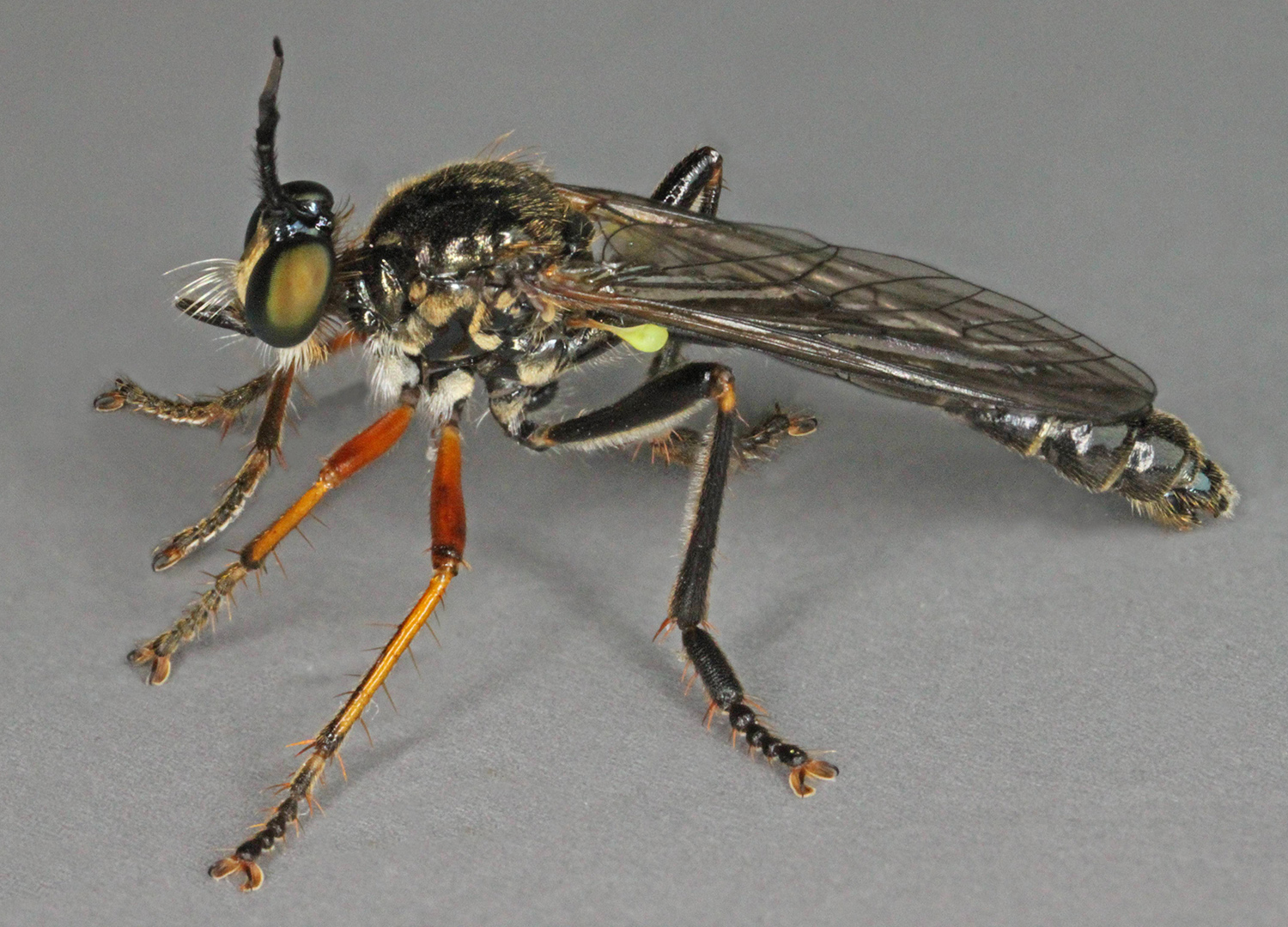
- Side view

Scientific classification
- Kingdom: Animalia
- Phylum: Arthropoda
- Clade: Pancrustacea
- Class: Insecta
- Order: Diptera
- Family: Asilidae
- Genus: Dioctria
- Species: D. rufipes

Binomial name
- Dioctria rufipes (De Geer, 1776)

Synonyms
- Asilus frontalis Fabricius, 1794; Asilus pratensis Olivier, 1789; Asilus venosus Geoffroy, 1785; Dioctria flavipes Fallén, 1814; Sylvicola cursor Harris, 1776

= Dioctria rufipes =

Species of fly

Dioctria rufipes, the common red-legged robberfly, is a species of robber fly in the subfamily Dasypogoninae of the family Asilidae.

== Distribution ==
This species can be found in most of Europe (Austria, Belgium, Bulgaria, the Czech Republic, Denmark, Estonia, France, the Netherlands, the former Yugoslavia, Germany, Poland, Romania, Russia, Slovakia, Sweden, Switzerland, Hungary, Great Britain, and Italy), in the Near East, and in the eastern Palearctic realm.

== Habitat ==
This species mainly inhabit scrubby grassland, well wooded areas, woodland edge and hedgerows.

== Description ==
Dioctria rufipes can reach a body length of about 8–15 mm (0.31–0.59 in) and a wings length of 7.5–9 mm (0.30–0.35 in). These medium-large robber flies have a black head and hard piercing mouthparts. The antennal tubercle is well-developed above the eyes. The mesothorax is black, lightly pubescent, with inconspicuous longitudinal stripes. The abdomen is slender, dorsally wider towards the back. The front legs are completely orange-red, whereas the hind legs are mainly black. They show a complete stripe of pale, short and soft pubescence (tomentum) on the sides of the thorax (pleura), with an additional ventral stripe above middle coxa.

== Biology ==
Adults can be found from May to July–August. These insects are predators on other insects. They mainly feed on parasitic wasps, ichneumonids, sawflies, empidid flies and a few small species (Phora, Oscinis, Opius species). The larvae develop as predators in the ground.

== Identification ==
Difficult to distinguish from other Dioctria. Wolff, Gebel and Geller-Grimm (2021), ( Majer (1997), van den Broek (1979), Stubbs and Drake (2001) all provide keys, descriptions and illustrations. Older works are also useful eg. Seguy (1920)

== Gallery ==
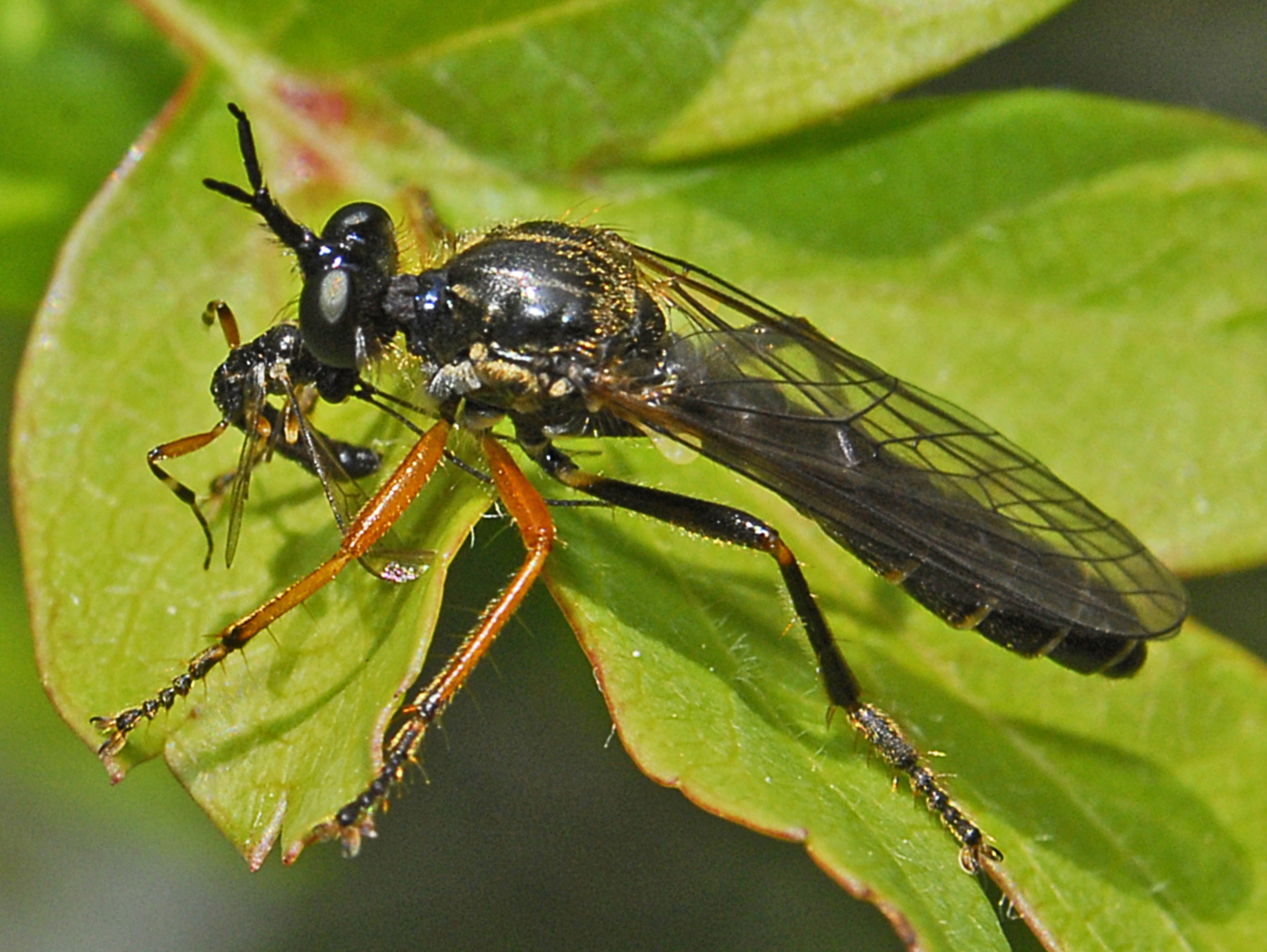
Dioctria rufipes with prey

Video clip
