= Diogmites missouriensis =

Scientific classification
- Domain: Eukaryota
- Kingdom: Animalia
- Phylum: Arthropoda
- Class: Insecta
- Order: Diptera
- Family: Asilidae
- Genus: Diogmites
- Species: D. missouriensis

Binomial name
- Diogmites missouriensis Bromley, 1951

Species of fly

Diogmites missouriensis is a species of robber flies in the family Asilidae.
