= Diogmites discolor =

Scientific classification
- Domain: Eukaryota
- Kingdom: Animalia
- Phylum: Arthropoda
- Class: Insecta
- Order: Diptera
- Family: Asilidae
- Genus: Diogmites
- Species: D. discolor

Binomial name
- Diogmites discolor Loew, 1866

Species of fly

Diogmites discolor is a species of robber flies in the family Asilidae.
