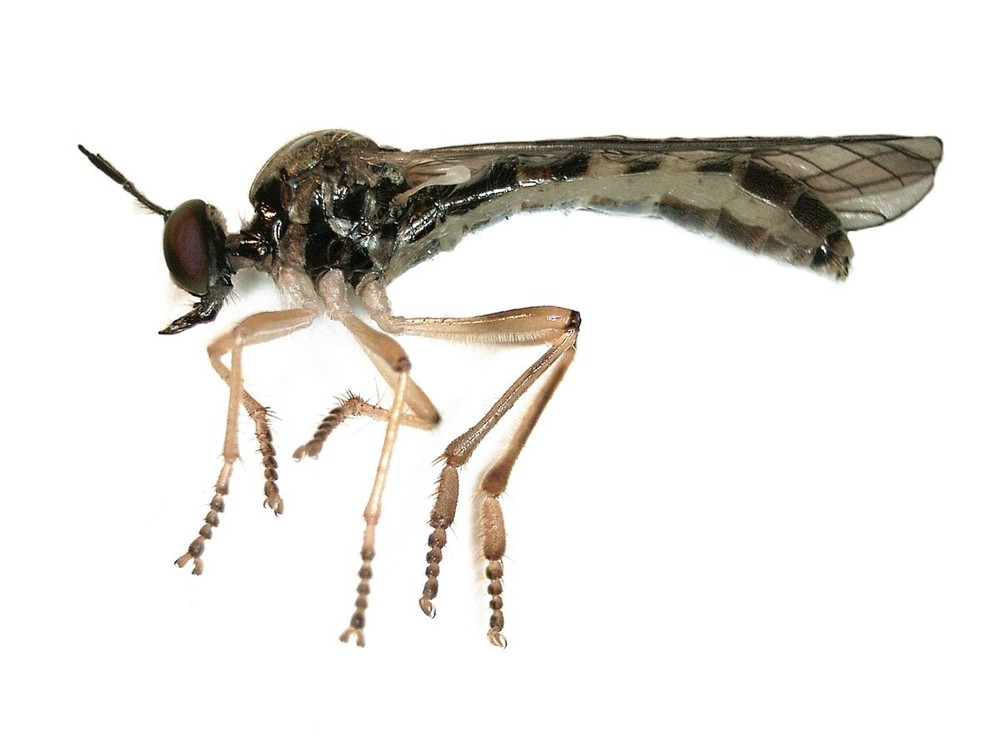
- Dioctria linearis Haulerwijk, the Netherlands

Scientific classification
- Kingdom: Animalia
- Phylum: Arthropoda
- Clade: Pancrustacea
- Class: Insecta
- Order: Diptera
- Family: Asilidae
- Genus: Dioctria
- Species: D. linearis

Binomial name
- Dioctria linearis (Fabricius, 1787)

= Dioctria linearis =

Species of fly

Dioctria linearis is a Palearctic species of robber fly in the family Asilidae.

The species is diurnal.

== Identification ==
Difficult to distinguish from other Dioctria. Wolff, Gebel and Geller-Grimm (2021), ( Majer (1997), van den Broek (1979), Stubbs and Drake (2001) all provide keys, descriptions and illustrations. Older works are also useful eg. Seguy (1920)
