= List of Asilidae species: L =

This article lists described species of the family Asilidae start with letter L.

A • B • C • D • E • F • G • H • I • J • K • L • M • N • O • P • Q • R • S • T • U • V • W • Y • Z

== List of species ==
=== Genus Labarus ===
- Labarus ignota (Londt, 2005)

=== Genus Labromyia ===
- Labromyia albibarbis (Hull, 1962)

=== Genus Lagynogaster ===
- Lagynogaster affinis (Frey, 1937)
- Lagynogaster antennalis (Hsia, 1949)
- Lagynogaster bicolor (Shi, 1993)
- Lagynogaster boettcheri (Frey, 1937)
- Lagynogaster claripennis (Hsia, 1949)
- Lagynogaster destillatoria (Hermann, 1917)
- Lagynogaster dimidiata (Hsia, 1949)
- Lagynogaster fujianensis (Shi, 1995)
- Lagynogaster fuliginosa (Hermann, 1917)
- Lagynogaster inscriptus (Hermann, 1917)
- Lagynogaster princeps (Osten-Sacken, 1882)
- Lagynogaster sauteri (Hermann, 1917)
- Lagynogaster stigmatica (Hermann, 1917)
- Lagynogaster suensoni (Frey, 1937)
- Lagynogaster timorensis (Frey, 1937)
- Lagynogaster vitalisiana (Frey, 1937)

=== Genus Laloides ===
- Laloides auripes (Bromley, 1930)
- Laloides disciplenus (Walker, 1861)
- Laloides justus (Walker, 1858)
- Laloides phalaris (Osten-Sacken, 1882)
- Laloides productus (Walker, 1857)
- Laloides pseudolus (Osten-Sacken, 1882)
- Laloides tigris (Tomosovic & Grootaert, 2003)

=== Genus Lampria ===
- Lampria aurifex (Osten-Sacken, 1887)
- Lampria bicincta (Walker, 1860)
- Lampria cilipes (Walker, 1857)
- Lampria circumdata (Bellardi, 1861)
- Lampria clavipes (Fabricius, 1805)
- Lampria dives (Wiedemann, 1828)
- Lampria fulgida (Schiner, 1868)
- Lampria macquarti (Perty, 1833)
- Lampria mexicana (Macquart, 1847)
- Lampria parvula (Bigot, 1878)
- Lampria pusilla (Macquart, 1838)
- Lampria scapularis (Bigot, 1878)
- Lampria splendens (Macquart, 1834)
- Lampria tolmides (Walker, 1849)

=== Genus Lamyra ===
- Lamyra greatheadi (Oldroyd, 1974)
- Lamyra gulo (Loew, 1851)
- Lamyra rossi (Oldroyd, 1974)

=== Genus Laphria ===
- Laphria abdominalis (Walker, 1855)^{c g}
- Laphria aberrans Wulp, 1898^{c g}
- Laphria aeatus Walker, 1849^{i c g}
- Laphria aeneiventris Costa, 1857^{c g}
- Laphria affinis Macquart, 1855^{i c g b}
- Laphria aimatis McAtee, 1919^{i c g}
- Laphria aktis Mcatee, 1919^{i c g b}
- Laphria albimaculata Macquart, 1838^{c g}
- Laphria albitibialis Macquart, 1847^{c g}
- Laphria alebas Walker, 1849^{c g}
- Laphria alternans Wiedemann, 1828^{c g}
- Laphria altitudinum Bromley, 1924^{i c g b}
- Laphria amabilis Wulp, 1872^{c g}
- Laphria ampla Walker, 1862^{c g}
- Laphria annulata Gimmerthal, 1834^{c g}
- Laphria annulifemur Enderlein, 1914^{c g}
- Laphria anthrax Meigen, 1804^{c g}
- Laphria aperta Walker, 1858^{c g}
- Laphria apila (Bromley, 1951)^{i c g b}
- Laphria appendiculata Macquart, 1846^{g}
- Laphria argentata (Wiedemann, 1828)
- Laphria argentifera Walker, 1861^{c g}
- Laphria asackeni Wilcox, 1965^{i c g b}
- Laphria assamensis Joseph & Parui, 1981^{c g}
- Laphria astur Osten-Sacken, 1877^{i c g b}
- Laphria asturina (Bromley, 1951)^{i c g b}
- Laphria atomentosa Oldroyd, 1960^{c g}
- Laphria aurea (Fabricius, 1794)^{c}
- Laphria aureola Wulp, 1872^{c g}
- Laphria aureopilosa Ricardo, 1900^{c g}
- Laphria auribasis Walker, 1864^{c g}
- Laphria auricincta Wulp, 1872^{c g}
- Laphria auricomata Hermann, 1914^{c g}
- Laphria auricorpus Hobby, 1948^{c g}
- Laphria aurifera Ricardo, 1925^{c g}
- Laphria auriflua Gerstaecker, 1861^{c g}
- Laphria auroria (Wiedemann, 1828)
- Laphria azurea Hermann, 1914^{c g}
- Laphria bancrofti Ricardo, 1913^{c g}
- Laphria barbicrura Rondani, 1875^{c g}
- Laphria basalis Hermann, 1914^{c g}
- Laphria basigutta Walker, 1857^{c g}
- Laphria bella Loew, 1858^{c g}
- Laphria bellifontanea Villeneuve, 1928^{c g}
- Laphria benardi Villeneuve, 1911^{c g}
- Laphria bengalensis (Wiedemann, 1828)
- Laphria bernsteinii Wulp, 1872^{c g}
- Laphria bifasciata (Olivier, 1789)^{c g}
- Laphria bilykovae Paramonov, 1930^{c g}
- Laphria bimaculata (Walker, 1855)^{c g}
- Laphria bipartita Macquart, 1855^{c g}
- Laphria bipenicillata Bigot, 1891^{c g}
- Laphria bomboides Macquart, 1849^{c g}
- Laphria breonii Macquart, 1838^{c g}
- Laphria burnsi Paramonov, 1958^{c g}
- Laphria calvescenta Baker, 1975^{i c g}
- Laphria canis Williston, 1883^{i c g b}
- Laphria carbonaria (Snow, 1896)^{i c g}
- Laphria carolinensis Schiner, 1867^{i c g}
- Laphria caspica Hermann, 1906^{c g}
- Laphria champlainii (Walton, 1910)^{i c g b}
- Laphria chappuisiana (Enderlein, 1914)^{c g}
- Laphria chrysocephala Meigen, 1820^{c g}
- Laphria chrysonota Hermann, 1914^{c g}
- Laphria chrysorhiza Hermann, 1914^{c g}
- Laphria chrysotelus (Walker, 1855)^{c g}
- Laphria cinerea (Back, 1904)^{i c g b}
- Laphria cingulifera Walker, 1856^{c g}
- Laphria claripennis Bigot, 1878^{c g}
- Laphria coarctata Dufour, 1833^{c g}
- Laphria coerulea Boisduval, 1835^{c g}
- Laphria coerulescens Macquart, 1834^{c g}
- Laphria columbica Walker, 1866^{i c g b}
- Laphria comata White, 1918^{c g}
- Laphria complens Walker, 1859^{c g}
- Laphria completa Walker, 1856^{c g}
- Laphria componens Walker, 1860^{c g}
- Laphria comptissima Walker, 1856^{c g}
- Laphria concludens Walker, 1859^{c g}
- Laphria conopoides (Oldroyd, 1972)^{c g}
- Laphria consistens Curran, 1928^{c g}
- Laphria constricta (Walker, 1855)^{c g}
- Laphria contristans Hobby, 1948^{c g}
- Laphria contusa Wiedmann, 1828^{c g}
- Laphria coquilletti McAtee, 1919^{i}
- Laphria coquillettii Mcatee, 1919^{c g b}
- Laphria ctenoventris Oldroyd, 1970^{c g}
- Laphria cyaneogaster Macquart, 1838^{c g}
- Laphria declarata Walker, 1858^{c g}
- Laphria definita Wulp, 1872^{c g}
- Laphria dentipes Fabricius, 1805^{c g}
- Laphria detecta Walker, 1856^{c g}
- Laphria dichroa Wiedemann, 1828^{c g}
- Laphria dimidiata Macquart, 1846^{c g}
- Laphria dimidiatifemur Oldroyd, 1960^{c g}
- Laphria dira (Walker, 1855)^{c g}
- Laphria dispar Coquillett, 1898^{c g}
- Laphria dissimilis Doleschall, 1858^{c g}
- Laphria diversa Wulp, 1881^{c g}
- Laphria divisor (Banks, 1917)^{i c g b}
- Laphria divulsa Walker, 1864^{c g}
- Laphria dizonias Loew, 1847^{c g}
- Laphria dorsalis (De Geer, 1776)^{c g}
- Laphria doryca (Boisduval, 1835)^{c g}
- Laphria egregia Wulp, 1898^{c g}
- Laphria empyrea Gerstaecker, 1861^{c g}
- Laphria engelhardti (Bromley, 1931)^{i c g b}
- Laphria ephippium (Fabricius, 1781)^{c g}
- Laphria falvifacies Macquart, 1850^{c g}
- Laphria fattigi (Bromley, 1951)^{i c g}
- Laphria felis Osten Sacken^{i c g b}
- Laphria fernaldi (Back, 1904)^{i c g b}
- Laphria ferox Williston, 1883^{i c g b}
- Laphria ferruginosa Wulp, 1872^{c g}
- Laphria flagrantissima Walker, 1858^{c g}
- Laphria flammipennis Walker, 1861^{c g}
- Laphria flava (Linnaeus, 1761)^{c g}
- Laphria flavescens Macquart, 1838^{i c g}
- Laphria flavicollis Say, 1824^{i c g b}
- Laphria flavidorsum Matsumura, 1916^{c g}
- Laphria flavifacies (Macquart, 1849)
- Laphria flavifemorata Macquart, 1850^{c g}
- Laphria flavipes Wiedemann, 1821^{c g}
- Laphria flavipila Macquart, 1834^{i c g}
- Laphria formosana Matsumura, 1916^{c g}
- Laphria fortipes Walker, 1857^{c g}
- Laphria franciscana Bigot, 1878^{i c g b}
- Laphria frommeri Joseph & Parui, 1981^{c g}
- Laphria fulvicrura Rondani, 1875^{c g}
- Laphria fulvipes Ricardo, 1913^{c g}
- Laphria fulvithorax Fabricius, 1805^{c g}
- Laphria furva Wulp, 1898^{c g}
- Laphria fuscata (Joseph & Parui, 1997)
- Laphria futilis Wulp, 1872^{c g}
- Laphria galathei Costa, 1857^{c g}
- Laphria georgina Wiedemann, 1821^{i c g}
- Laphria gibbosa (Linnaeus, 1758)^{c g}
- Laphria gigas Macquart, 1838^{c g}
- Laphria gilva (Linnaeus, 1758)^{i c g b}
- Laphria gilvoides Wulp, 1898^{c g}
- Laphria glauca Enderlein, 1914^{c g}
- Laphria gravipes Wulp, 1872^{c g}
- Laphria grossa (Fabricius, 1775)^{i c g b}
- Laphria gulo ^{g}
- Laphria hakiensis Matsumura, 1916^{c g}
- Laphria hecate Gerstaecker, 1861^{c g}
- Laphria hera Bromley, 1935^{c g}
- Laphria hermanni Meijere, 1924^{c g}
- Laphria hirta Ricardo, 1913^{c g}
- Laphria hirticornis Guérin-Méneville, 1835^{c g}
- Laphria histrionica Wulp, 1872^{c g}
- Laphria hobelias (Oldroyd, 1972)^{c g}
- Laphria horrida (Walker, 1855)^{c g}
- Laphria howeana Paramonov, 1958^{c g}
- Laphria hradskyi Young, 2008^{c g}
- Laphria huron (Bromley, 1929)^{i c g b}
- Laphria ignobilis Wulp, 1872^{c g}
- Laphria imbellis Walker, 1857^{c g}
- Laphria inaurea Walker, 1857^{c g}
- Laphria incivilis Walker, 1856^{c g}
- Laphria index Mcatee, 1919^{i c g b}
- Laphria indica Joseph & Parui, 1981^{c g}
- Laphria insignis (Banks, 1917)^{i c g b}
- Laphria interrupta Walker, 1856^{c g}
- Laphria iola Bromley, 1935^{c g}
- Laphria ithypyga Mcatee, 1919^{i c g b}
- Laphria ivorina Oldroyd, 1968^{c g}
- Laphria janus Mcatee, 1919^{i c g b}
- Laphria javana Macquart, 1834^{c g}
- Laphria justa Walker, 1858^{c g}
- Laphria karafutonis Matsumura, 1916^{c g}
- Laphria keralaensis Joseph & Parui, 1981^{c g}
- Laphria kistjakovskiji Paramonov, 1929^{c g}
- Laphria lasipes Wiedemann, 1828^{i c g}
- Laphria lata Macquart, 1850^{i c g b}
- Laphria lateralis Fabricius, 1805^{c g}
- Laphria laterepunctata Macquart, 1838^{c g}
- Laphria lepida Walker, 1856^{c g}
- Laphria leptogaster Perty, 1833^{c g}
- Laphria leucocephala Meigen, 1804^{c g}
- Laphria leucoprocta Wiedemann, 1828^{c g}
- Laphria limbinervis Strobl, 1898^{c g}
- Laphria lobifera Hermann, 1914^{c g}
- Laphria luctuosa Macquart, 1847^{c g}
- Laphria lukinsi Paramonov, 1958^{c g}
- Laphria luteipennis (Macquart, 1848)^{c g}
- Laphria luteopilosa Joseph & Parui, 1981^{c g}
- Laphria macquarti (Banks, 1917)^{i c g b}
- Laphria macra Bigot, 1859^{c g}
- Laphria manifesta Walker, 1858^{c g}
- Laphria marginalis Williston, 1901^{c g}
- Laphria maynei Janssens, 1953^{c g}
- Laphria melania Bigot, 1878^{c g}
- Laphria melanogaster Wiedemann, 1821^{i c g}
- Laphria mellipes Wiedemann, 1828^{c g}
- Laphria meridionalis Mulsant, 1860^{c g}
- Laphria metalli Walker, 1851^{c g}
- Laphria milvina Bromley, 1929^{i c g}
- Laphria mitsukurii Coquillett, 1898^{c g}
- Laphria motodomariensis Matsumura, 1916^{c g}
- Laphria mulleri Wulp, 1872^{c g}
- Laphria multipunctata Oldroyd, 1974^{c g}
- Laphria nathani Joseph & Parui, 1981^{c g}
- Laphria nigella (Bromley, 1934)^{i c g}
- Laphria nigrescens Ricardo, 1925^{c g}
- Laphria nigribimba Bromley, 1935^{c g}
- Laphria nigripennis Meigen, 1820^{c g}
- Laphria nigripes Paramonov, 1929^{c g}
- Laphria nigrohirsuta Lichtwardt, 1809^{c g}
- Laphria nitidula (Fabricius, 1794)^{c g}
- Laphria notabilis Walker, 1857^{c g}
- Laphria nusoides Bromley, 1931^{c g}
- Laphria ogasawarensis Matsumura, 1916^{c g}
- Laphria ogumae Matsumura, 1911^{c g}
- Laphria okinawensis (Matsumura, 1916)
- Laphria orcus Walker, 1857^{c g}
- Laphria orientalis Joseph & Parui, 1981^{c g}
- Laphria ostensa Walker, 1862^{c g}
- Laphria pacifera (Paramonov, 1958)
- Laphria pacifica Paramonov, 1958^{c g}
- Laphria partitor (Banks, 1917)^{i c g b}
- Laphria peristalsis (Oldroyd, 1972)^{c g}
- Laphria pernigra Wulp, 1872^{c g}
- Laphria philippinensis Enderlein, 1914^{c g}
- Laphria pilipes Macquart, 1834^{c g}
- Laphria plana Walker, 1857^{c g}
- Laphria posticata Say, 1824^{i c g b}
- Laphria praelusia Seguy, 1930^{c g}
- Laphria proxima (Walker, 1855)^{c g}
- Laphria puer Doleschall, 1858^{c g}
- Laphria pusilla Wiedemann, 1828^{c g}
- Laphria pyrrhothrix Hermann, 1914^{c g}
- Laphria radicalis Walker, 1857^{c g}
- Laphria rapax Osten-Sacken, 1877^{i c g}
- Laphria reginae Paramonov, 1958^{c g}
- Laphria reinwardtii Wiedemann, 1828^{c g}
- Laphria remota Hermann, 1914^{c g}
- Laphria ricardoi Bromley, 1935^{c g}
- Laphria royalensis (Bromley, 1950)^{i c g}
- Laphria rubescens Bigot, 1878^{c g}
- Laphria rubidofasciata Wulp, 1872^{c g}
- Laphria rudis Walker, 1856^{c g}
- Laphria rueppelii (Wiedemann, 1828)^{c g}
- Laphria rufa Roder, 1887^{c g}
- Laphria ruficauda Williston, 1885^{c g}
- Laphria rufifemorata Macquart, 1846^{c g}
- Laphria rufitibia Oldroyd, 1960^{c g}
- Laphria sackeni (Banks, 1917)^{c g b}
- Laphria sacrator Walker, 1849^{i c g b}
- Laphria sadales Walker, 1849^{i c g b}
- Laphria saffrana Fabricius, 1805^{i c g b}
- Laphria sapporensis Matsumura, 1911^{c g}
- Laphria schoutedeni Bromley, 1935^{c g}
- Laphria scorpio Mcatee, 1919^{i c g b}
- Laphria scutellata Macquart, 1835^{c g}
- Laphria semifulva Bigot, 1878^{c g}
- Laphria semitecta (Coquillett, 1910)^{i c g}
- Laphria sericea Say, 1823^{i c g b}
- Laphria serpentina Bezzi, 1908^{c g}
- Laphria seticrura Rondani, 1875^{c g}
- Laphria sibirica Lehr, 1989^{c g}
- Laphria sicula Mcatee, 1919^{i c g b}
- Laphria signatipes Wulp, 1872^{c g}
- Laphria sobria Walker, 1857^{c g}
- Laphria solita Wulp, 1872^{c g}
- Laphria soror Wulp, 1872^{c g}
- Laphria stuckenbergi Oldroyd, 1960^{c g}
- Laphria submetallica Macquart, 1838^{c g}
- Laphria taipinensis (Matsumura, 1916)
- Laphria taphia Walker, 1849^{c g}
- Laphria taphius Walker, 1849^{c}
- Laphria telecles Walker, 1849^{c g}
- Laphria terminalis Wulp, 1872^{c g}
- Laphria terraenovae Macquart, 1838^{i c g}
- Laphria thoracica Fabricius, 1805^{i c g b}
- Laphria tibialis Meigen, 1820^{c g}
- Laphria transatlantica Schiner, 1868^{c g}
- Laphria triangularis (Walker, 1855)^{c g}
- Laphria tricolor Wulp, 1872^{c g}
- Laphria triligata Walker, 1861^{c g}
- Laphria tristis Doleschall, 1857^{c g}
- Laphria trux Mcatee, 1919^{i c g b}
- Laphria unicolor (Williston, 1883)^{i c g b}
- Laphria unifascia Walker, 1856^{c g}
- Laphria valparaiensis (Joseph & Parui, 1997)
- Laphria varia Loew, 1865^{c g}
- Laphria variana White, 1918^{c g}
- Laphria varipes Bigot, 1878^{c g}
- Laphria venatrix Loew, 1847^{c g}
- Laphria venezuelensis Macquart, 1846^{c g}
- Laphria ventralis Williston, 1885^{i c g b}
- Laphria violacea Macquart, 1846^{c g}
- Laphria virginica (Banks, 1917)^{i c g b}
- Laphria vivax Williston, 1883^{i c g}
- Laphria vorax (Bromley, 1929)^{i c g b}
- Laphria vulcana Wiedemann, 1828^{c}
- Laphria vulpina Meigen, 1820^{c g}
- Laphria vultur Osten-Sacken, 1877^{i c g b}
- Laphria walkeri Enderlein, 1914^{c g}
- Laphria willistoniana Enderlein, 1914^{c g}
- Laphria winnemana Mcatee, 1919^{i c g b}
- Laphria xanthothrix Hermann, 1914^{c g}
- Laphria yamatonis Matsumura, 1916^{c g}

Data sources: i = ITIS, c = Catalogue of Life, g = GBIF, b = Bugguide.net

=== Genus Laphyctis ===
- Laphyctis argenteofasciata (Engel, 1929)
- Laphyctis eremia Londt & Dikow, 2018
- Laphyctis gigantella (Loew, 1852)
- Laphyctis iota Londt & Dikow, 2018
- Laphyctis kochi (Lindner, 1973)
- Laphyctis orichalcea (Lindner, 1973)

=== Genus Laphygmolestes ===
- Laphygmolestes flavipes (Hull, 1962)

=== Genus Laphystia ===
- Laphystia aegyptiaca (Efflatoun, 1937)
- Laphystia albiceps (Macquart, 1846)
- Laphystia alpheia (Janssens, 1958)
- Laphystia anatolica (Hermann, 1920)
- Laphystia bromleyi (Wilcox, 1960)
- Laphystia brookmani (Wilcox, 1960)
- Laphystia canadensis (Curran, 1927)
- Laphystia cazieri (Wilcox, 1960)
- Laphystia columbina (Schiner, 1868)
- Laphystia confusa (Curran, 1927)
- Laphystia dimidiata (Oldroyd, 1958)
- Laphystia duncani (Wilcox, 1960)
- Laphystia flavipes (Coquillett, 1904)
- Laphystia francoisi (Janssens, 1966)
- Laphystia hispanica (Strobl, 1906)
- Laphystia howlandi (Wilcox, 1960)
- Laphystia indica (Joseph & Parui, 1997)
- Laphystia jamesi (Wilcox, 1960)
- Laphystia kuehlhorni (Janssens, 1961)
- Laphystia laguna (Wilcox, 1960)
- Laphystia lanhami (James, 1941)
- Laphystia lehri (Abbassian-Lintzen, 1964)
- Laphystia limatula (Coquillett, 1904)
- Laphystia litoralis (Curran, 1931)
- Laphystia martini (Wilcox, 1960)
- Laphystia notata (Bigot, 1878)
- Laphystia ochreifrons (Curran, 1931)
- Laphystia pilamensis (Hradský, 1983)
- Laphystia pursati (Tomasovic & Smets, 2007)
- Laphystia robusta (Hermann, 1908)
- Laphystia rubra (Hull, 1957)
- Laphystia rufiventris (Curran, 1931)
- Laphystia rufofasciata (Curran, 1931)
- Laphystia sabulicola (Loew, 1847)
- Laphystia selenis (Paramonov, 1930)
- Laphystia setosa (Theodor, 1980)
- Laphystia sillersi (Hull, 1963)
- Laphystia snowi (Wilcox, 1960)
- Laphystia sonora (Wilcox, 1960)
- Laphystia stigmaticalis (Bigot, 1878)
- Laphystia texensis (Curran, 1931)
- Laphystia tolandi (Wilcox, 1960)
- Laphystia torpida (Hull, 1957)
- Laphystia utahensis (Wilcox, 1960)
- Laphystia varipes (Curran, 1931)

=== Genus Laphystotes ===
- Laphystotes ariel (Londt, 2004)

=== Genus Lasiocnemus ===
- Lasiocnemus fascipennis (Engel & Cuthbertson, 1939)
- Lasiocnemus hermanni (Janssens, 1952)
- Lasiocnemus hyalipennis (Janssens, 1952)
- Lasiocnemus londti (Dikow, 2007)
- Lasiocnemus lugens (Loew, 1858)
- Lasiocnemus obscuripennis (Loew, 1851)

=== Genus Lasiopogon ===
- Lasiopogon actius (Melander, 1923)
- Lasiopogon akaishii (Hradský, 1981)
- Lasiopogon albidus (Cole & Wilcox, 1938)
- Lasiopogon aldrichii (Melander, 1923)
- Lasiopogon apache (Cannings, 2002)
- Lasiopogon apenninus (Bezzi, 1921)
- Lasiopogon appalachensis (Cannings, 2002)
- Lasiopogon arenicola (Osten-Sacken, 1877)
- Lasiopogon avetianae (Richter, 1962)
- Lasiopogon bellardii (Jaennicke, 1867)
- Lasiopogon bezzii (Engel, 1929)
- Lasiopogon bivittatus (Loew, 1866)
- Lasiopogon californicus (Cole & Wilcox, 1938)
- Lasiopogon canus (Cole & Wilcox, 1938)
- Lasiopogon chaetosus (Cole & Wilcox, 1938)
- Lasiopogon chrysotus (Cannings, 2002)
- Lasiopogon coconino (Cannings, 2002)
- Lasiopogon curranis (Cole & Wilcox, 1938)
- Lasiopogon delicatulus (Melander, 1923)
- Lasiopogon dimicki (Cole & Wilcox, 1938)
- Lasiopogon eichingeri (Hradský, 1981)
- Lasiopogon flammeus (Cannings, 2002)
- Lasiopogon fourcatensis (Timon-David, 1950)
- Lasiopogon gabrieli (Cole & Wilcox, 1938)
- Lasiopogon gracilipes (Bezzi, 1921)
- Lasiopogon hasanicus (Lehr, 1984)
- Lasiopogon kjachtensis (Lehr, 1984)
- Lasiopogon lavignei (Cannings, 2002)
- Lasiopogon lehri (Cannings, 2002)
- Lasiopogon leleji (Cannings, 2002)
- Lasiopogon littoris (Cole, 1924)
- Lasiopogon macquarti (Perris, 1852)
- Lasiopogon marshalli (Cannings, 2002)
- Lasiopogon monticola (Melander, 1923)
- Lasiopogon novus (Lehr, 1984)
- Lasiopogon oklahomensis (Cole & Wilcox, 1938)
- Lasiopogon pacificus (Cole & Wilcox, 1938)
- Lasiopogon peusi (Hradský, 1982)
- Lasiopogon phaeothysanotus (Cannings, 2002)
- Lasiopogon piestolophus (Cannings, 2002)
- Lasiopogon pilosellus (Loew, 1847)
- Lasiopogon polensis (Lavigne, 1969)
- Lasiopogon primus (Adisoemarto, 1967)
- Lasiopogon pugeti (Cole & Wilcox, 1938)
- Lasiopogon qinghaiensis (Cannings, 2002)
- Lasiopogon ripicola (Melander, 1923)
- Lasiopogon rokuroi (Hradský, 1981)
- Lasiopogon schizopygus (Cannings, 2002)
- Lasiopogon septentrionalis (Lehr, 1984)
- Lasiopogon shermanni (Cole & Wilcox, 1938)
- Lasiopogon slossonae (Cole & Wilcox, 1938)
- Lasiopogon soffneri (Hradský & Moucha, 1964)
- Lasiopogon solox (Enderlein, 1914)
- Lasiopogon tarsalis (Loew, 1847)
- Lasiopogon terneicus (Lehr, 1984)
- Lasiopogon terricola (Johnson, 1900)
- Lasiopogon testaceus (Cole & Wilcox, 1938)
- Lasiopogon tetragrammus (Loew, 1874)
- Lasiopogon trivittatus (Melander, 1923)
- Lasiopogon tuvinus (Richter, 1977)
- Lasiopogon woodorum (Cannings, 2002)
- Lasiopogon yukonensis (Cole & Wilcox, 1938)
- Lasiopogon zaitzevi (Lehr, 1984)
- Lasiopogon zonatus (Cole & Wilcox, 1938)

=== Genus Lastaurina ===
- Lastaurina biezankoi (Carrera & Papavero, 1962)
- Lastaurina travassosi (Carrera, 1949)

=== Genus Lastaurus ===
- Lastaurus alticola (Carrera & Machado-Allison, 1968)
- Lastaurus tricolor (Carrera & Machado-Allison, 1968)
- Lastaurus fenestratus (Bigot, 1878)
- Lastaurus robustus (Carrera, 1949)
- Lastaurus transiens (Walker, 1849)
- Lastaurus villosus (Carrera, 1949)

=== Genus Laxenecera ===
- Laxenecera abdominalis (Oldroyd, 1970)
- Laxenecera albibarbis (Macquart, 1838)
- Laxenecera andrenoides (Macquart, 1846)
- Laxenecera auribarba (Karsch, 1879)
- Laxenecera auricomata (Hermann, 1919)
- Laxenecera auripes (Hermann, 1919)
- Laxenecera bengalensis (Wiedemann, 1821)
- Laxenecera chapini (Curran, 1927)
- Laxenecera chrysonema (Oldroyd, 1970)
- Laxenecera cooksoni (Oldroyd, 1974)
- Laxenecera dasypoda (Speiser, 1910)
- Laxenecera dimidiata (Curran, 1927)
- Laxenecera francoisi (Oldroyd, 1970)
- Laxenecera gymna (Oldroyd, 1970)
- Laxenecera langi (Curran, 1927)
- Laxenecera misema (Oldroyd, 1970)
- Laxenecera moialeana (Séguy, 1939)
- Laxenecera mollis (Loew, 1858)
- Laxenecera nigrociliata (Hermann, 1919)
- Laxenecera niveibarba (Hermann, 1919)
- Laxenecera pulchella (Oldroyd, 1970)
- Laxenecera scopifera (Speiser, 1910)
- Laxenecera serpentina (Hermann, 1919)
- Laxenecera sexfasciata (Walker, 1851)
- Laxenecera sororcula (Karsch, 1888)
- Laxenecera tristis (Bigot, 1858)

=== Genus Lecania ===
- Lecania baleta (Walker, 1849)
- Lecania boraceae (Carrera, 1958)
- Lecania calatina (Walker, 1849)
- Lecania clavata (Macquart, 1838)
- Lecania ctesicles (Walker, 1851)
- Lecania femorata (Macquart, 1838)
- Lecania hilarii (Macquart, 1838)
- Lecania leucopyga (Wiedemann, 1828)
- Lecania mellina (Wiedemann, 1828)
- Lecania mygdon (Walker, 1851)
- Lecania pollinosa (Hull, 1962)
- Lecania rufina (Wiedemann, 1819)
- Lecania rufipes (Macquart, 1838)
- Lecania sexmaculatus (Walker, 1855)
- Lecania tabescens (Rondani, 1875)

=== Genus Leinendera ===
- Leinendera rubra (Carrera, 1945)

=== Genus Leptarthrus ===
- Leptarthrus krali (Hradský & Geller-Grimm, 1997)

=== Genus Leptochelina ===
- Leptochelina jaujensis (Artigas, 1970)

=== Genus Leptogaster ===
- Leptogaster abdominalis (Hsia, 1949)
- Leptogaster aegra (Martin, 1957)
- Leptogaster aestiva (White, 1914)
- Leptogaster affinis (Lehr, 1972)
- Leptogaster aganniphe (Janssens, 1957)
- Leptogaster agrionina (Speiser, 1910)
- Leptogaster albitarsis (Macquart, 1846)
- Leptogaster altacola (Martin, 1957)
- Leptogaster angelus (Osten-Sacken, 1881)
- Leptogaster angustilineola (Martin, 1964)
- Leptogaster annulipes (Walker, 1855)
- Leptogaster antennalis (Janssens, 1954)
- Leptogaster antenorea (Lioy, 1864)
- Leptogaster antipoda (Bigot, 1879)
- Leptogaster apicalis (Enderlein, 1914)
- Leptogaster appendiculata (Hermann, 1917)
- Leptogaster arborcola (Martin, 1957)
- Leptogaster arenicola (James, 1937)
- Leptogaster arida (Cole, 1919)
- Leptogaster aristalis (Janssens, 1957)
- Leptogaster armeniaca (Paramonov, 1930)
- Leptogaster atridorsalis (Back, 1909)
- Leptogaster augusta (Hsia, 1949)
- Leptogaster auripulverella (Séguy, 1934)
- Leptogaster australis (Ricardo, 1912)
- Leptogaster autumnalis (White, 1916)
- Leptogaster bahamiensis (Scarbrough, 1996)
- Leptogaster bancrofti (Ricardo, 1912)
- Leptogaster basalis (Walker, 1855)
- Leptogaster basilewskyi (Janssens, 1955)
- Leptogaster bengryi (Farr, 1963)
- Leptogaster biannulata (Martin, 1964)
- Leptogaster bicolor (Macquart, 1848)
- Leptogaster bilobata (Hermann, 1917)
- Leptogaster bivittata (Lehr, 1975)
- Leptogaster brevicornis (Loew, 1872)
- Leptogaster brevitarsis (Hardy, 1935)
- Leptogaster breviventris (Theodor, 1980)
- Leptogaster calceata (Engel, 1925)
- Leptogaster californica (Martin, 1957)
- Leptogaster calvimacula (Martin, 1964)
- Leptogaster candidata (Séguy, 1930)
- Leptogaster canuta (Martin, 1964)
- Leptogaster cheriani (Bromley, 1938)
- Leptogaster cilipes (Frey, 1937)
- Leptogaster cingulipes (Walker, 1849)
- Leptogaster clavistyla (Rondani, 1848)
- Leptogaster coarctata (Hermann, 1917)
- Leptogaster collata (Martin, 1964)
- Leptogaster coloradensis (James, 1937)
- Leptogaster concava (Martin, 1964)
- Leptogaster concinnata (Williston, 1901)
- Leptogaster coniata (Oldroyd, 1960)
- Leptogaster cracens (Martin, 1964)
- Leptogaster crassipes (Hsia, 1949)
- Leptogaster crassitarsis (Frey, 1937)
- Leptogaster cressoni (Bromley, 1942)
- Leptogaster crinita (Martin, 1957)
- Leptogaster crocea (Williston, 1901)
- Leptogaster crockeri (Curran, 1936)
- Leptogaster cultaventris (Martin, 1957)
- Leptogaster curvivena (Hsia, 1949)
- Leptogaster dasyphlebia (Martin, 1964)
- Leptogaster decellei (Oldroyd, 1968)
- Leptogaster diluta (Martin, 1964)
- Leptogaster dissimilis (Ricardo, 1912)
- Leptogaster distincta (Schiner, 1867)
- Leptogaster dorsopicta (Hsia, 1949)
- Leptogaster ealensis (Janssens, 1954)
- Leptogaster elbaiensis (Efflatoun, 1937)
- Leptogaster elongata (Martin, 1964)
- Leptogaster entebbensis (Oldroyd, 1939)
- Leptogaster erecta (Meunier, 1906)
- Leptogaster eudicrana (Loew, 1874)
- Leptogaster evanescens (Janssens, 1954)
- Leptogaster exacta (Walker, 1861)
- Leptogaster faragi (Efflatoun, 1937)
- Leptogaster ferruginea (Walker, 1855)
- Leptogaster ferruginea (Walker, 1858)
- Leptogaster flaviventris (Hsia, 1949)
- Leptogaster flavobrunnea (Hull, 1967)
- Leptogaster formosana (Enderlein, 1914)
- Leptogaster fornicata (Martin, 1957)
- Leptogaster fulvipes (Bigot, 1879)
- Leptogaster fumipennis (Loew, 1871)
- Leptogaster fumosa (Janssens, 1954)
- Leptogaster furculata (Hsia, 1949)
- Leptogaster fuscifacies (Martin, 1964)
- Leptogaster galbicesta (Martin, 1964)
- Leptogaster geniculata (Macquart, 1850)
- Leptogaster globopyga (Hull, 1967)
- Leptogaster gracilis (Loew, 1847)
- Leptogaster habilis (Wulp, 1872)
- Leptogaster helvola (Loew, 1871)
- Leptogaster hermelina (Janssens, 1954)
- Leptogaster hermonensis (Theodor, 1980)
- Leptogaster hesperis (Martin, 1957)
- Leptogaster hirticollis (Wulp, 1872)
- Leptogaster hirtipes (Coquillett, 1904)
- Leptogaster hopehensis (Hsia, 1949)
- Leptogaster hyacinthina (Scarbrough, 1996)
- Leptogaster insularis (Janssens, 1954)
- Leptogaster intima (Williston, 1901)
- Leptogaster inutilis (Walker, 1857)
- Leptogaster jamaicensis (Farr, 1963)
- Leptogaster javanensis (Meijere, 1914)
- Leptogaster judaica (Janssens, 1969)
- Leptogaster kamerlacheri (Schiner, 1867)
- Leptogaster kashgarica (Paramonov, 1930)
- Leptogaster keiseri (Martin, 1964)
- Leptogaster krada (Oldroyd, 1960)
- Leptogaster lambertoni (Bromley, 1942)
- Leptogaster lanata (Martin, 1957)
- Leptogaster laoshanensis (Hsia, 1949)
- Leptogaster latestriata (Becker, 1906)
- Leptogaster lehri (Hradský & Hüttinger, 1983)
- Leptogaster lerneri (Curran, 1953)
- Leptogaster levis (Wulp, 1872)
- Leptogaster linearis (Becker, 1906)
- Leptogaster lineatus (Scarbrough, 1996)
- Leptogaster longicauda (Hermann, 1917)
- Leptogaster longicrinita (Martin, 1964)
- Leptogaster longifurcata (Meijere, 1914)
- Leptogaster longipes (Walker, 1858)
- Leptogaster longitibialis (Efflatoun, 1937)
- Leptogaster ludens (Curran, 1927)
- Leptogaster macedo (Janssens, 1959)
- Leptogaster macilenta (Wulp, 1872)
- Leptogaster maculipennis (Hsia, 1949)
- Leptogaster madagascariensis (Frey, 1937)
- Leptogaster magnicollis (Walker, 1861)
- Leptogaster martini (Farr, 1963)
- Leptogaster masaica (Lindner, 1955)
- Leptogaster medicesta (Martin, 1964)
- Leptogaster megafemur (Hull, 1967)
- Leptogaster melanomystax (Janssens, 1954)
- Leptogaster micropygialis (Williston, 1901)
- Leptogaster moluccana (Doleschall, 1857)
- Leptogaster montana (Theodor, 1980)
- Leptogaster munda (Walker, 1860)
- Leptogaster murina (Loew, 1862)
- Leptogaster nartshukae (Lehr, 1961)
- Leptogaster nerophana (Oldroyd, 1960)
- Leptogaster nigra (Hsia, 1949)
- Leptogaster nitens (Bromley, 1947)
- Leptogaster nitoris (Martin, 1957)
- Leptogaster nubeculosa (Bigot, 1878)
- Leptogaster obscuripennis (Johnson, 1895)
- Leptogaster occidentalis (White, 1914)
- Leptogaster odostata (Oldroyd, 1960)
- Leptogaster ophionea (Frey, 1937)
- Leptogaster pachypygialis (Engel, 1925)
- Leptogaster palawanensis (Oldroyd, 1972)
- Leptogaster pallipes (von Roeder, 1840)
- Leptogaster palparis (Loew, 1847)
- Leptogaster panda (Martin, 1957)
- Leptogaster parvoclava (Martin, 1957)
- Leptogaster patula (Martin, 1957)
- Leptogaster pedania (Walker, 1849)
- Leptogaster pellucida (Janssens, 1954)
- Leptogaster penicillata (Janssens, 1954)
- Leptogaster petiola (Martin, 1964)
- Leptogaster pictipennis (Loew, 1858)
- Leptogaster pilicnemis (Janssens, 1954)
- Leptogaster pilosella (Hermann, 1917)
- Leptogaster plebeja (Janssens, 1957)
- Leptogaster pubescens (Curran, 1934)
- Leptogaster puella (Janssens, 1953)
- Leptogaster pumila (Macquart, 1834)
- Leptogaster pyragra (Janssens, 1957)
- Leptogaster radialis (Janssens, 1954)
- Leptogaster recurva (Martin, 1964)
- Leptogaster roederi (Williston, 1896)
- Leptogaster rufa (Janssens, 1953)
- Leptogaster rufescens (Janssens, 1954)
- Leptogaster ruficesta (Martin, 1964)
- Leptogaster rufirostris (Loew, 1858)
- Leptogaster rufithorax (Meijere, 1913)
- Leptogaster salina (Lehr, 1972)
- Leptogaster salvia (Martin, 1957)
- Leptogaster schaefferi (Back, 1909)
- Leptogaster schoutedeni (Janssens, 1954)
- Leptogaster sericea (Janssens, 1954)
- Leptogaster seyrigi (Janssens, 1954)
- Leptogaster signata (Meijere, 1914)
- Leptogaster similis (Hsia, 1949)
- Leptogaster sinensis (Hsia, 1949)
- Leptogaster spadix (Hsia, 1949)
- Leptogaster spinitarsis (Bromley, 1951)
- Leptogaster spinulosa (Meijere, 1914)
- Leptogaster stackelbergi (Lehr, 1961)
- Leptogaster stichosoma (Janssens, 1957)
- Leptogaster straminea (Becker, 1906)
- Leptogaster suleymani (Hasbenli & Candan & Alpay, 2006)
- Leptogaster tarsalis (Walker, 1861)
- Leptogaster tarsalis (Janssens, 1954)
- Leptogaster tenerrima (Meijere, 1914)
- Leptogaster tenuis (Loew, 1858)
- Leptogaster texana (Bromley, 1934)
- Leptogaster tillyardi (Hardy, 1935)
- Leptogaster titanus (Carrera, 1958)
- Leptogaster tomentosa (Oldroyd, 1972)
- Leptogaster tomentosa (Theodor, 1980)
- Leptogaster tornowii (Brèthes, 1904)
- Leptogaster triangulata (Williston, 1901)
- Leptogaster tricolor (Walker, 1857)
- Leptogaster trifasciata (Meijere, 1914)
- Leptogaster trimucronotata (Hermann, 1917)
- Leptogaster tropica (Curran, 1934)
- Leptogaster truncata (Theodor, 1980)
- Leptogaster turkmenica (Paramonov, 1930)
- Leptogaster ungula (Martin, 1964)
- Leptogaster unicolor (Doleschall, 1858)
- Leptogaster unihammata (Hermann, 1917)
- Leptogaster upembana (Janssens, 1954)
- Leptogaster urundiana (Janssens, 1953)
- Leptogaster varipes (Wulp, 1880)
- Leptogaster velutina (Janssens, 1954)
- Leptogaster vernalis (White, 1914)
- Leptogaster virgata (Coquillett, 1904)
- Leptogaster vitripennis (Schiner, 1867)
- Leptogaster vorax (Curran, 1934)

=== Genus Leptoharpacticus ===
- Leptoharpacticus mucius (Walker, 1849)

=== Genus Leptopteromyia ===
- Leptopteromyia americana (Hardy, 1947)
- Leptopteromyia argentinae (Martin, 1971)
- Leptopteromyia brasilae (Martin, 1971)
- Leptopteromyia colombiae (Martin, 1971)
- Leptopteromyia lopesi (Martin, 1971)
- Leptopteromyia mexicanae (Martin, 1971)
- Leptopteromyia peruae (Martin, 1971)

=== Genus Lestomyia ===
- Lestomyia atripes (Wilcox, 1937)
- Lestomyia fraudigera (Williston, 1883)
- Lestomyia montis (Cole, 1916)
- Lestomyia strigipes (Curran, 1931)
- Lestomyia unicolor (Curran, 1942)

=== Genus Lestophonax ===
- Lestophonax mallophoroides (Hull, 1962)

=== Genus Lissoteles ===
- Lissoteles acapulcae (Martin, 1961)
- Lissoteles aquilonius (Martin, 1961)
- Lissoteles austrinus (Martin, 1961)
- Lissoteles autumnalis (Martin, 1961)
- Lissoteles blantoni (Martin, 1961)
- Lissoteles capronae (Martin, 1961)
- Lissoteles fernandezii (Kaletta, 1976)
- Lissoteles hermanni (Bezzi, 1910)
- Lissoteles vanduzeei (Cole, 1923)

=== Genus Lithoeciscus ===
- Lithoeciscus heydenii (Loew, 1871)

=== Genus Lobus ===
- Lobus bandipurensis (Joseph & Parui, 1992)
- Lobus bicingulatus (Bezzi, 1906)
- Lobus evenhuisi (Joseph & Parui, 1991)
- Lobus guineae (Martin, 1972)
- Lobus jairami (Joseph & Parui, 1984)
- Lobus janssensi (Martin, 1972)
- Lobus kenyae (Martin, 1972)
- Lobus keralae (Martin, 1972)
- Lobus liberiae (Martin, 1972)
- Lobus martini (Joseph & Parui, 1983)
- Lobus pallipes (Janssens, 1953)
- Lobus pandai (Joseph & Parui, 1999)
- Lobus unilineatus (Martin, 1972)
- Lobus vindex (Janssens, 1954)

=== Genus Lochmorhynchus ===
- Lochmorhynchus albicans (Carrera & Andretta, 1953)
- Lochmorhynchus albinigrus (Artigas, 1981)
- Lochmorhynchus borrori (Artigas, 1970)
- Lochmorhynchus chilechicoensis (Artigas, 1970)
- Lochmorhynchus cribratus (Hull, 1962)
- Lochmorhynchus leoninus (Artigas, 1970)
- Lochmorhynchus longiterebratus (Macquart, 1850)
- Lochmorhynchus mucidus (Walker, 1837)
- Lochmorhynchus puntarenensis (Artigas, 1970)
- Lochmorhynchus senectus (Wulp, 1882)

=== Genus Lochyrus ===
- Lochyrus balmacedensis (Artigas, 1970)
- Lochyrus frezieri (Artigas, 1970)

=== Genus Loewinella ===
- Loewinella aphaea (Séguy, 1950)
- Loewinella arcuata (Curran, 1927)
- Loewinella deemingi (Londt, 1982)
- Loewinella eburacta (Londt, 1982)
- Loewinella flavipes (Londt, 1982)
- Loewinella lehri (Londt, 1982)
- Loewinella nitidicollis (Lehr, 1958)

=== Genus Lycoprosopa ===
- Lycoprosopa atrimaculata (Hobby, 1934)

=== Genus Lycosimyia ===
- Lycosimyia carrerae (Hull, 1958)
- Lycosimyia fluviatilis (Carrera, 1960)

=== Genus Lycostommyia ===
- Lycostommyia albifacies (Hermann, 1907)
- Lycostommyia atrifrons (Londt, 1992)
- Lycostommyia mopani (Londt, 1992)
- Lycostommyia ornithopus (Londt, 1992)
- Lycostommyia rhabdotus (Londt, 1992)
- Lycostommyia trichotus (Londt, 1992)
