= List of Leptogaster species =

This is a list of 291 species in Leptogaster, a genus of robber flies in the family Asilidae.

== Species ==
These species belong to the genus Leptogaster:

- Leptogaster abdominalis Hsia, 1949
- Leptogaster acanthozona Janssens, 1954
- Leptogaster aegra Martin, 1957
- Leptogaster aestiva White, 1914
- Leptogaster affinis Lehr, 1972
- Leptogaster aganniphe Janssens, 1957
- Leptogaster albimana Walker, 1858
- Leptogaster albimanus Walker, 1858
- Leptogaster albitarsis (Macquart, 1846)
- Leptogaster algarvensis Bosák & Hradský, 2008
- Leptogaster altacola Martin, 1957
- Leptogaster angela Osten Sacken, 1881
- Leptogaster angelus Osten Sacken, 1881
- Leptogaster angustilineola Martin, 1964
- Leptogaster annulipes Walker, 1855
- Leptogaster antennalis Janssens, 1954
- Leptogaster antenorea (Lioy, 1864)
- Leptogaster antipoda Bigot, 1878
- Leptogaster antiquaria Martin, 1964
- Leptogaster apicalis Enderlein, 1914
- Leptogaster appendiculata Hermann, 1917
- Leptogaster arabica Bosák & Hradský, 2011
- Leptogaster arborcola Martin, 1957
- Leptogaster arenicola James, 1937
- Leptogaster arenicolus James, 1937
- Leptogaster argentinae Martin, 1972
- Leptogaster argionina Speiser, 1910
- Leptogaster arida Cole, 1919
- Leptogaster aristalis Janssens, 1957
- Leptogaster armeniaca Paramonov, 1930
- Leptogaster aruensis Tomasovic, 2020
- Leptogaster atridorsalis Back, 1909
- Leptogaster augusta Hsia, 1949
- Leptogaster auripulverella Séguy, 1934
- Leptogaster australis Ricardo, 1912
- Leptogaster autumnalis White, 1916
- Leptogaster bahamiensis Scarbrough, 1996
- Leptogaster bancrofti Ricardo, 1912
- Leptogaster basalis Walker, 1855
- Leptogaster basilaris Coquillett, 1898
- Leptogaster basilewskyi Janssens, 1955
- Leptogaster bengryi Farr, 1963
- Leptogaster biannulata Martin, 1964
- Leptogaster bicolor (Macquart, 1848)
- Leptogaster bicoloripes (Hsia, 1949)
- Leptogaster bilobata Hermann, 1917
- Leptogaster bivittata Lehr, 1975
- Leptogaster brevicornis Loew, 1872
- Leptogaster brevitarsis Hardy, 1935
- Leptogaster breviventris Theodor, 1980
- Leptogaster brunnea Loew, 1858
- Leptogaster calceata Engel, 1925
- Leptogaster californica Martin, 1957
- Leptogaster calvimacula Martin, 1964
- Leptogaster candidata Séguy, 1929
- Leptogaster canuta Martin, 1964
- Leptogaster carolinensis Schiner, 1866
- Leptogaster carotenoides Tomasovic, 1999
- Leptogaster cheriani Bromley, 1938
- Leptogaster cilipes Frey, 1937
- Leptogaster cingulipes Walker, 1857
- Leptogaster clavistila (Rondani, 1848)
- Leptogaster coarctata Hermann, 1917
- Leptogaster collata Martin, 1964
- Leptogaster coloradensis James, 1937
- Leptogaster concava Martin, 1964
- Leptogaster concinnata Williston, 1901
- Leptogaster coniata Oldroyd, 1960
- Leptogaster contermina Edwards, 1919
- Leptogaster cracens Martin, 1964
- Leptogaster crassipes Hsia, 1949
- Leptogaster crassitarsis Frey, 1937
- Leptogaster cressoni Bromley, 1942
- Leptogaster crocea Williston, 1901
- Leptogaster crockeri Curran, 1936
- Leptogaster cultaventris Martin, 1957
- Leptogaster curvivena Hsia, 1949
- Leptogaster cylindrica (De Geer, 1776) (Striped Slender Robberfly)
- Leptogaster dalmatina Engel, 1925
- Leptogaster dasyphlebia Martin, 1964
- Leptogaster decellei Oldroyd, 1968
- Leptogaster deserticola Bosák & Hradský, 2011
- Leptogaster diluta Martin, 1964
- Leptogaster dissimilis Ricardo, 1912
- Leptogaster distincta Schiner, 1867
- Leptogaster doleschalli Oldroyd, 1975
- Leptogaster dorospicta Hsia, 1949
- Leptogaster ealensis Janssens, 1954
- Leptogaster elbaiensis Efflatoun, 1937
- Leptogaster elongata Martin, 1964
- Leptogaster entebbensis Oldroyd, 1939
- Leptogaster eoa (Lehr, 1961)
- Leptogaster erecta Meunier, 1906
- Leptogaster eudicrana Loew, 1874
- Leptogaster evanescens Janssens, 1954
- Leptogaster exacta Walker, 1861
- Leptogaster faragi Efflatoun, 1937
- Leptogaster ferruginea Walker, 1855
- Leptogaster fervens Wiedemann, 1830
- Leptogaster filiventris Hsia, 1949
- Leptogaster flavipes Loew, 1862
- Leptogaster flaviventris Hsia, 1949
- Leptogaster flavobrunnea Hull, 1967
- Leptogaster formosana Enderlein, 1914
- Leptogaster fornicata Martin, 1957
- Leptogaster freyi Bromley, 1951
- Leptogaster fulvicra (Hsia, 1949)
- Leptogaster fulvipes Bigot, 1878
- Leptogaster fumipennis Loew, 1871
- Leptogaster fumosa Janssens, 1954
- Leptogaster furculata Hsia, 1949
- Leptogaster fuscifacies Martin, 1964
- Leptogaster fuscipennis Blanchard, 1854
- Leptogaster galbicesta Martin, 1964
- Leptogaster geniculata (Macquart, 1850)
- Leptogaster globopyga Hull, 1967
- Leptogaster gracilipes (Hsia, 1949)
- Leptogaster gracilis Loew, 1847
- Leptogaster guttiventris Zetterstedt, 1842 (Dashed Slender Robberfly)
- Leptogaster habilis Wulp, 1872
- Leptogaster helvola Loew, 1871
- Leptogaster hermelina Janssens, 1954
- Leptogaster hermonensis Theodor, 1980
- Leptogaster hesperis Martin, 1957
- Leptogaster hirticollis Wulp, 1872
- Leptogaster hirtipes Coquillett, 1904
- Leptogaster hispanica Meigen, 1838
- Leptogaster hopehensis Hsia, 1949
- Leptogaster humeralis
- Leptogaster hyacinthina Scarbrough, 1996
- Leptogaster incisuralis Loew, 1862
- Leptogaster inflata Osten Sacken, 1881
- Leptogaster inflatus Osten Sacken, 1881
- Leptogaster insularis Janssens, 1954
- Leptogaster intermedia Meigen & Waltl, 1835
- Leptogaster intermedius Meigen
- Leptogaster intima Williston, 1901
- Leptogaster inutilis Walker, 1856
- Leptogaster jamaicensis Farr, 1963
- Leptogaster javanensis Meijere, 1914
- Leptogaster judaica Janssens, 1969
- Leptogaster kamerlacheri Schiner, 1867
- Leptogaster kashgarica Paramonov, 1930
- Leptogaster keiseri Martin, 1964
- Leptogaster koshunensis Oldroyd, 1975
- Leptogaster krada Oldroyd, 1960
- Leptogaster lambertoni Bromley, 1942
- Leptogaster lanata Martin, 1957
- Leptogaster laoshanensis Hsia, 1949
- Leptogaster latestriata Becker, 1906
- Leptogaster lehri Hradský & Huttinger, 1983
- Leptogaster lerneri Curran, 1953
- Leptogaster levis Wulp, 1872
- Leptogaster levusara (Evenhuis, 2006)
- Leptogaster linearis Becker, 1906
- Leptogaster lineata Scarbrough, 1996
- Leptogaster loaloa (Evenhuis, 2006)
- Leptogaster logicaudu Hermann, 1917
- Leptogaster longicauda Hermann, 1917
- Leptogaster longicrinita Martin, 1964
- Leptogaster longifurcata Meijere, 1914
- Leptogaster longipes Walker, 1858
- Leptogaster longitibialis Efflatoun, 1937
- Leptogaster ludens Curran, 1927
- Leptogaster macedo Janssens, 1959
- Leptogaster macilenta Wulp, 1872
- Leptogaster maculipennis Hsia, 1949
- Leptogaster madagascariensis Frey, 1937
- Leptogaster madangensis Tomasovic, 2020
- Leptogaster magnicollis Walker, 1861
- Leptogaster martini Farr, 1963
- Leptogaster masaica Lindner, 1955
- Leptogaster medicesta Martin, 1964
- Leptogaster megafemur Hull, 1967
- Leptogaster melanomystax Janssens, 1954
- Leptogaster meriel (Evenhuis, 2006)
- Leptogaster micropygialis Williston, 1901
- Leptogaster minomensis
- Leptogaster moluccana (Doleschall, 1857)
- Leptogaster montana Theodor, 1980
- Leptogaster multicincta Walker, 1851
- Leptogaster munda Walker, 1859
- Leptogaster murina Loew, 1862
- Leptogaster nartshukae Lehr, 1961
- Leptogaster nememusha Speiser, 1910
- Leptogaster nerophana Oldroyd, 1960
- Leptogaster niger Wiedemann, 1828
- Leptogaster nigra Hsia, 1949
- Leptogaster nigricoxa
- Leptogaster nikiforovi Sakhvon, 2024
- Leptogaster nitens Bromley, 1947
- Leptogaster nitida Macquart, 1826
- Leptogaster nitoris Martin, 1957
- Leptogaster nubeculosa Bigot, 1878
- Leptogaster obscuripennis Johnson, 1895
- Leptogaster obscuripes Loew, 1862
- Leptogaster occidentalis White, 1914
- Leptogaster occlusa Meijere, 1914
- Leptogaster ochricornis Loew, 1858
- Leptogaster odostata Oldroyd, 1960
- Leptogaster ophionea Frey, 1937
- Leptogaster pachypygialis Engel, 1925
- Leptogaster pacifica Bezzi, 1928
- Leptogaster palawanensis Oldroyd, 1972
- Leptogaster pallipes Roser, 1840
- Leptogaster palparis Loew, 1847
- Leptogaster panda Martin, 1957
- Leptogaster parvoclava Martin, 1957
- Leptogaster patula Martin, 1957
- Leptogaster pedania Walker, 1849
- Leptogaster pedunculata Loew, 1847
- Leptogaster pellucida Janssens, 1954
- Leptogaster penicillata Janssens, 1954
- Leptogaster petiola Martin, 1964
- Leptogaster pictipennis Loew, 1858
- Leptogaster pilosella Hermann, 1917
- Leptogaster plebeja Janssens, 1957
- Leptogaster plilcnemis Janssens, 1954
- Leptogaster princeps Osten Sacken, 1882
- Leptogaster pubescens Curran, 1934
- Leptogaster pubicornis Loew, 1847
- Leptogaster puella Janssens, 1953
- Leptogaster pumila (Macquart, 1834)
- Leptogaster pumilus (Macquart, 1834)
- Leptogaster pusilla Jaennicke, 1867
- Leptogaster pyragra Janssens, 1957
- Leptogaster radialis Janssens, 1954
- Leptogaster recurva Martin, 1964
- Leptogaster roederi Williston, 1896
- Leptogaster roederi Williston, 1896
- Leptogaster rubida Wiedemann, 1821
- Leptogaster rufa Janssens, 1953
- Leptogaster ruficesta Martin, 1964
- Leptogaster rufirostris Loew, 1858
- Leptogaster rufithorax Meijere, 1913
- Leptogaster rutulica Astakhov, 2019
- Leptogaster salina Lehr, 1972
- Leptogaster salvia Martin, 1957
- Leptogaster schaefferi Back, 1909
- Leptogaster schoutedeni Janssens, 1954
- Leptogaster sericea Janssens, 1954
- Leptogaster seyrigi Janssens, 1954
- Leptogaster signata Meijere, 1914
- Leptogaster similis Hsia, 1949
- Leptogaster simplex Bigot, 1878
- Leptogaster sinensis Hsia, 1949
- Leptogaster spadix Hsia, 1949
- Leptogaster spinitarsis Bromley, 1951
- Leptogaster spinulosa Meijere, 1914
- Leptogaster stackelbergi Lehr, 1961
- Leptogaster stichosoma Janssens, 1957
- Leptogaster straminea Becker, 1906
- Leptogaster subtilis Loew, 1847
- Leptogaster suleymani Hasbenli, 2006
- Leptogaster tarsalis Walker, 1861
- Leptogaster taurica Lehr, 1961
- Leptogaster tenerrima Meijere, 1914
- Leptogaster tenuis Loew, 1858
- Leptogaster tesquorum Lehr, 1961
- Leptogaster texana Bromley, 1934
- Leptogaster tillyardi Hardy, 1935
- Leptogaster titanus Carrera, 1958
- Leptogaster tomentosa Oldroyd, 1972
- Leptogaster tornowii Brèthes, 1904
- Leptogaster triangulata Williston, 1901
- Leptogaster tricolor Walker, 1856
- Leptogaster trifasciata Meijere, 1914
- Leptogaster trimaculata Meijere, 1914
- Leptogaster trimucronotata Hermann, 1917
- Leptogaster tropica Curran, 1934
- Leptogaster truncata Theodor, 1980
- Leptogaster turkmenica Paramonov, 1930
- Leptogaster ungula Martin, 1964
- Leptogaster unicolor (Doleschall, 1858)
- Leptogaster unihammata Hermann, 1917
- Leptogaster upembana Janssens, 1954
- Leptogaster urundiana Janssens, 1953
- Leptogaster varipes Wulp, 1880
- Leptogaster velutina Janssens, 1954
- Leptogaster venusta Bromley, 1929
- Leptogaster vernalis White, 1914
- Leptogaster virgata Coquillett, 1904
- Leptogaster vitiensis (Evenhuis, 2006)
- Leptogaster vitripennis Schiner, 1867
- Leptogaster vittata Wiedemann, 1828
- Leptogaster vittatus Wiedemann, 1828
- Leptogaster vorax Curran, 1934
- Leptogaster whitei Hardy, 1940
- † Leptogaster cerestensis Nel & Jouault, 2022
- † Leptogaster falloti Théobald, 1937
- † Leptogaster hellii Unger, 1841
- † Leptogaster prior Melander, 1947
