= Tipulogaster =

Scientific classification
- Kingdom: Animalia
- Phylum: Arthropoda
- Clade: Pancrustacea
- Class: Insecta
- Order: Diptera
- Family: Asilidae
- Subfamily: Leptogastrinae
- Genus: Tipulogaster; Cockerell, 1913

Genus of flies

Tipulogaster is a genus of robber flies (insects in the family Asilidae). There are at least two described species in Tipulogaster.

== Species ==
These two species belong to the genus Tipulogaster:

- Tipulogaster glabrata (Wiedemann, 1828)^{i c g b}
- Tipulogaster lancea Tomasovic, 2002^{c g}

Data sources: i = ITIS, c = Catalogue of Life, g = GBIF, b = Bugguide.net
