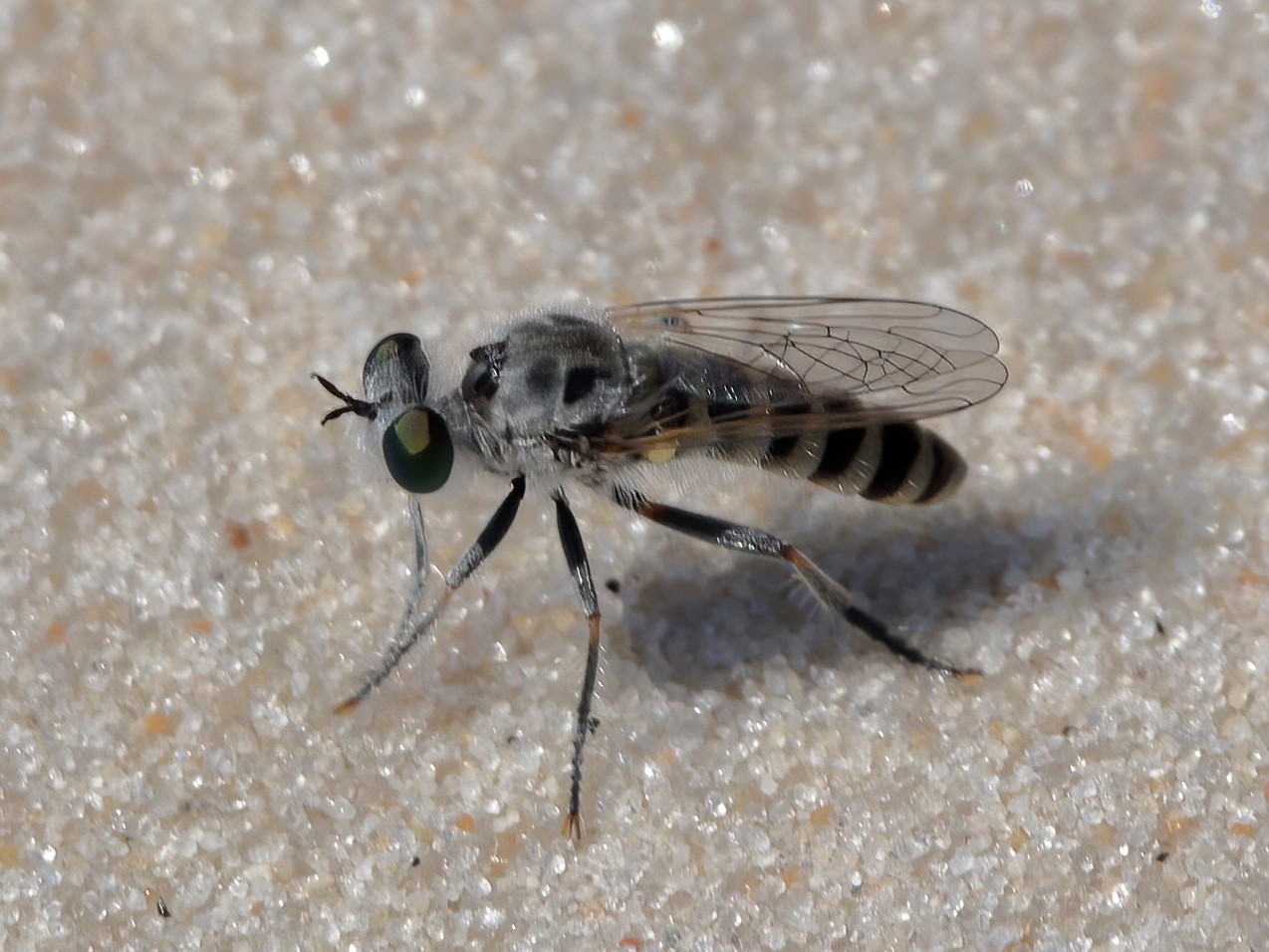
- Laphystia texensis

Scientific classification
- Domain: Eukaryota
- Kingdom: Animalia
- Phylum: Arthropoda
- Class: Insecta
- Order: Diptera
- Family: Asilidae
- Tribe: Laphystiini
- Genus: Laphystia; Loew, 1847

= Laphystia =

Genus of flies

Laphystia is a genus of robber flies in the family Asilidae. There are at least 50 described species in Laphystia.

== Species ==
These 56 species belong to the genus Laphystia:

- Laphystia actius (Melander, 1923)^{i c g}
- Laphystia aegyptiaca Efflatoun, 1937^{c g}
- Laphystia albicans Engel, 1932^{c g}
- Laphystia albiceps (Macquart, 1846)^{i c g}
- Laphystia alpheia Janssens, 1958^{c g}
- Laphystia anatolica (Hermann, 1920)^{c g}
- Laphystia annulata Hull, 1957^{i c g}
- Laphystia bromleyi Wilcox, 1960^{i c g}
- Laphystia brookmani Wilcox, 1960^{i c g}
- Laphystia canadensis Curran, 1927^{i c g}
- Laphystia carnea Hermann, 1906^{c g}
- Laphystia cazieri Wilcox, 1960^{i c g}
- Laphystia columbina Schiner, 1868^{c g}
- Laphystia confusa Curran, 1927^{i c g}
- Laphystia dimidiata Oldroyd, 1958^{c g}
- Laphystia duncani Wilcox, 1960^{i c g}
- Laphystia erberi Schiner, 1866^{c g}
- Laphystia fasciata (Lynch Arribalzaga, 1880)^{c g}
- Laphystia flavipes Coquillett, 1904^{i c g b}
- Laphystia francoisi Janssens, 1966^{c g}
- Laphystia gigantella (Loew, 1852)^{c g}
- Laphystia hispanica Strobl, 1906^{c g}
- Laphystia howlandi Wilcox, 1960^{i c g}
- Laphystia jamesi Wilcox, 1960^{i c g}
- Laphystia kazaka Lehr, 1969^{c g}
- Laphystia kuehlhorni Janssens, 1961^{c g}
- Laphystia laguna Wilcox, 1960^{i c g}
- Laphystia lanhami James, 1941^{i c g}
- Laphystia latiuscula Loew, 1871^{c g}
- Laphystia lehri Abbassian-Lintzen, 1964^{c g}
- Laphystia limatula Coquillett, 1904^{i c g}
- Laphystia litoralis Curran, 1931^{i c g b}
- Laphystia martini Wilcox, 1960^{i c g}
- Laphystia notata (Bigot, 1878)^{i c g b}
- Laphystia ochreifrons Curran, 1931^{i c g b}
- Laphystia opaca Coquillett, 1904^{i c g}
- Laphystia pilamensis Hradsky, 1983^{c g}
- Laphystia robusta Hermann, 1908^{c g}
- Laphystia rubra Hull, 1957^{i c g}
- Laphystia rufiventris Curran, 1931^{i c g}
- Laphystia rufofasciata Curran, 1931^{i c g}
- Laphystia sabulicola Loew, 1847^{c g}
- Laphystia schnusei Hermann, 1908^{c g}
- Laphystia selenis Paramonov, 1930^{c g}
- Laphystia setosa Theodor, 1980^{c g}
- Laphystia sexfasciata (Say, 1823)^{i g}
- Laphystia sillersi Hull, 1963^{i c g}
- Laphystia snowi Wilcox, 1960^{i c g}
- Laphystia sonora Wilcox, 1960^{c g}
- Laphystia stigmaticallis Bigot, 1878^{c g}
- Laphystia texensis Curran, 1931^{i c g b}
- Laphystia tolandi Wilcox, 1960^{i c g}
- Laphystia tollandi^{b}
- Laphystia torpida Hull, 1957^{i c g}
- Laphystia utahensis Wilcox, 1960^{i c g}
- Laphystia varipes Curran, 1931^{i c g}

Data sources: i = ITIS, c = Catalogue of Life, g = GBIF, b = Bugguide.net
