= Tipulogaster glabrata =

Scientific classification
- Domain: Eukaryota
- Kingdom: Animalia
- Phylum: Arthropoda
- Class: Insecta
- Order: Diptera
- Family: Asilidae
- Genus: Tipulogaster
- Species: T. glabrata

Binomial name
- Tipulogaster glabrata (Wiedemann, 1828)

Synonyms
- Leptogaster badius Loew, 1862; Leptogaster glabratus Wiedemann, 1828; Leptogaster testaceus Loew, 1862

Species of fly

Tipulogaster glabrata is a species of robber flies (insects in the family Asilidae).
