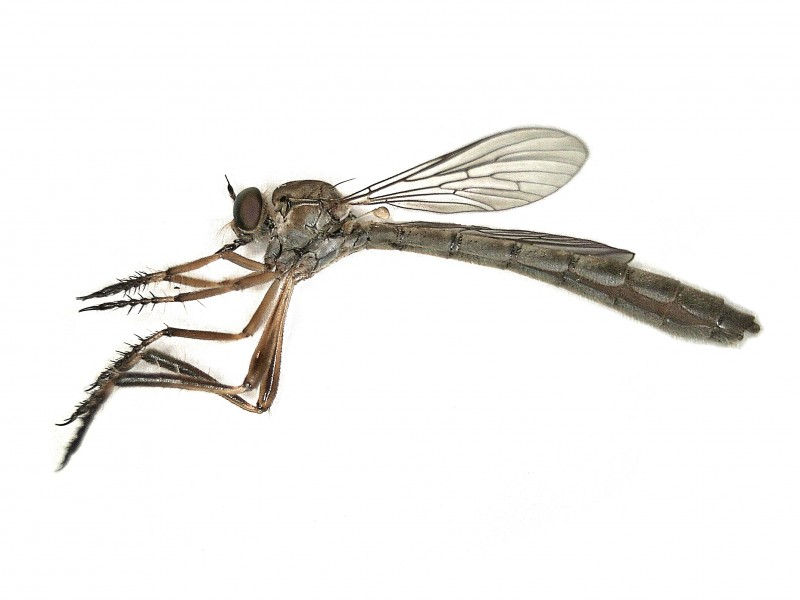
- Leptogaster cylindrica Elst (Gld), the Netherlands

Scientific classification
- Kingdom: Animalia
- Phylum: Arthropoda
- Clade: Pancrustacea
- Class: Insecta
- Order: Diptera
- Family: Asilidae
- Genus: Leptogaster
- Species: L. cylindrica

Binomial name
- Leptogaster cylindrica (De Geer, 1776)

= Leptogaster cylindrica =

Species of insect

Leptogaster cylindrica is a Palearctic species of robber fly in the family Asilidae.

== Identification ==
Difficult to distinguish from other leptogaster. Wolff, Gebel and Geller-Grimm (2021), ( Majer (1997), van den Broek (1979), Stubbs and Drake (2001) all provide keys, descriptions and illustrations. Older works are also useful eg. Seguy (1920)
