= Psilonyx =

Scientific classification
- Kingdom: Animalia
- Phylum: Arthropoda
- Class: Insecta
- Order: Diptera
- Family: Asilidae
- Subfamily: Leptogastrinae
- Genus: Psilonyx; Aldrich, 1923

Genus of flies

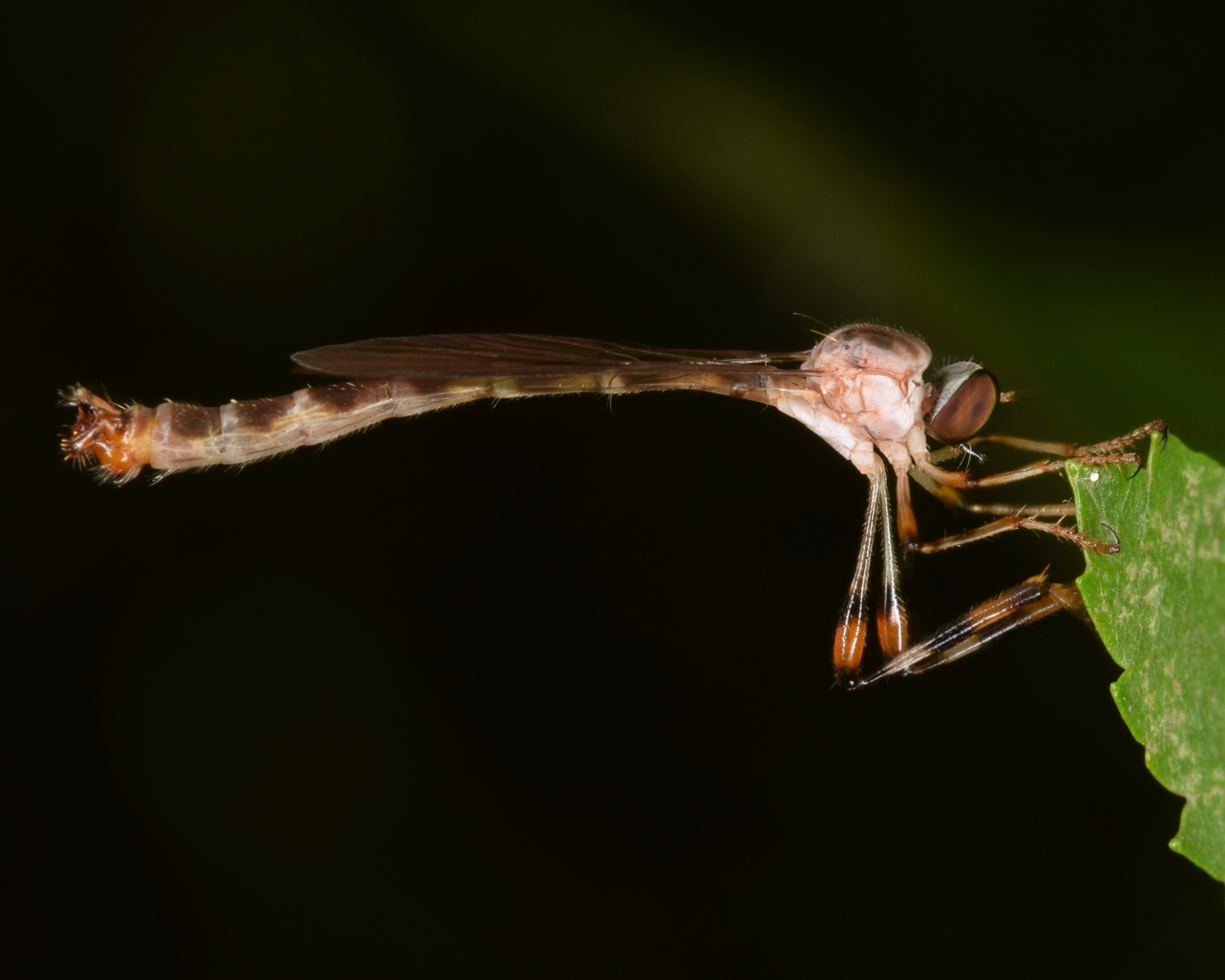
Psilonyx annulatus

Psilonyx is a genus of robber flies (insects in the family Asilidae). There are about 14 described species in Psilonyx.

== Species ==
These 14 species belong to the genus Psilonyx:

- Psilonyx annulatus (Say, 1823)^{i c g b}
- Psilonyx annuliventris Hsia, 1949^{c g}
- Psilonyx arawak Farr, 1963^{c g}
- Psilonyx dorsiniger Zhang & Yang, 2009^{c g}
- Psilonyx flavican Shi, 1993^{c g}
- Psilonyx flavicoxa Zhang & Yang, 2009^{c g}
- Psilonyx hsiai Shi, 1993^{c g}
- Psilonyx humeralis Hsia, 1949^{c g}
- Psilonyx macropygialis (Williston, 1901)^{c g}
- Psilonyx magnicauda (Curran, 1934)^{c g}
- Psilonyx migricoxa Hsia, 1949^{g}
- Psilonyx minimensis (Matsumura, 1916)^{c g}
- Psilonyx nigricoxa Hsia, 1949^{c g}
- Psilonyx zephyrus Scarbrough & Page, 2005^{c g}

Data sources: i = ITIS, c = Catalogue of Life, g = GBIF, b = Bugguide.net
