= Psilonyx annulatus =

Scientific classification
- Domain: Eukaryota
- Kingdom: Animalia
- Phylum: Arthropoda
- Class: Insecta
- Order: Diptera
- Family: Asilidae
- Genus: Psilonyx
- Species: P. annulatus

Binomial name
- Psilonyx annulatus (Say, 1823)

Synonyms
- Leptogaster annulatus Say, 1823; Leptogaster histrio Wiedemann, 1828

Species of fly

Psilonyx annulatus is a species of robber fly in the family Asilidae.
