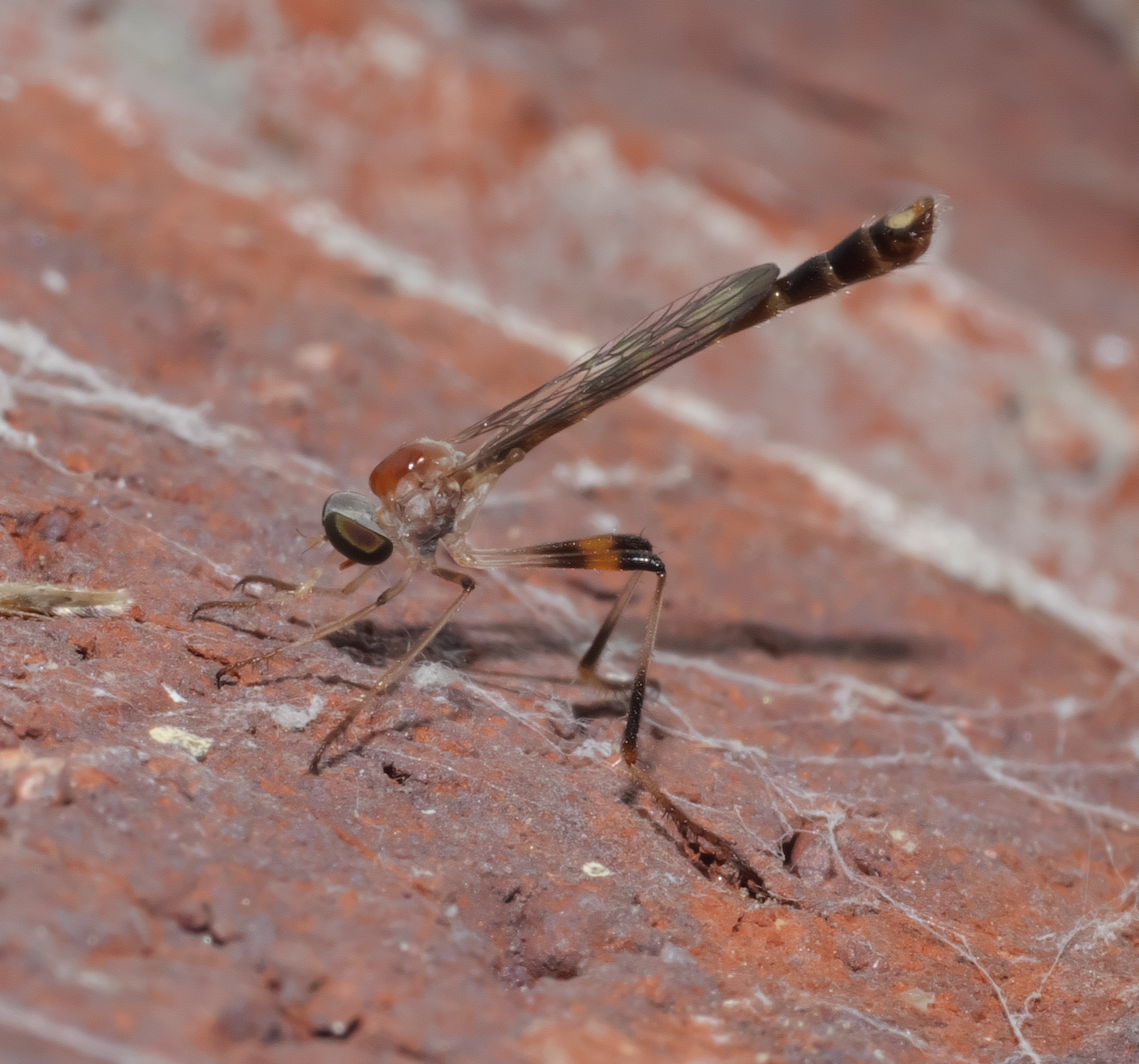
- Leptogaster aegra, Oklahoma

Scientific classification
- Kingdom: Animalia
- Phylum: Arthropoda
- Class: Insecta
- Order: Diptera
- Family: Asilidae
- Subfamily: Leptogastrinae
- Genus: Leptogaster
- Species: L. aegra

Binomial name
- Leptogaster aegra Martin, 1957

= Leptogaster aegra =

Species of flies

Leptogaster aegra is a species of robber fly in the family Asilidae, found in the United States east of the Rocky Mountains.
