= Lestomyia =

Scientific classification
- Domain: Eukaryota
- Kingdom: Animalia
- Phylum: Arthropoda
- Class: Insecta
- Order: Diptera
- Family: Asilidae
- Subfamily: Dasypogoninae
- Genus: Lestomyia; Williston, 1884

Genus of flies

Lestomyia is a genus of robber flies in the family Asilidae. There are about six described species in Lestomyia.

== Species ==
These six species belong to the genus Lestomyia:

- Lestomyia atripes Wilcox, 1937^{i c g}
- Lestomyia fraudigera (Williston, 1883)^{i c g}
- Lestomyia montis Cole, 1916^{i c g}
- Lestomyia sabulona (Osten Sacken, 1877)^{i c g}
- Lestomyia strigipes Curran, 1931^{i c g b}
- Lestomyia unicolor Curran, 1942^{i c g}

Data sources: i = ITIS, c = Catalogue of Life, g = GBIF, b = Bugguide.net
