= Leptogaster flavipes =

Scientific classification
- Domain: Eukaryota
- Kingdom: Animalia
- Phylum: Arthropoda
- Class: Insecta
- Order: Diptera
- Family: Asilidae
- Genus: Leptogaster
- Species: L. flavipes

Binomial name
- Leptogaster flavipes Loew, 1862

Synonyms
- Leptogaster favillaceus Loew, 1862; Leptogaster flavicornis Wulp, 1867; Leptogaster loewi Banks, 1914

Species of fly

Leptogaster flavipes is a species of robber flies in the family Asilidae.
