= Leptopteromyia =

Scientific classification
- Domain: Eukaryota
- Kingdom: Animalia
- Phylum: Arthropoda
- Class: Insecta
- Order: Diptera
- Family: Asilidae
- Subfamily: Leptogastrinae
- Genus: Leptopteromyia; Williston, 1907

Genus of flies

Leptopteromyia is a genus of robber flies in the family Asilidae. There are about seven described species in Leptopteromyia.

== Species ==
These seven species belong to the genus Leptopteromyia:

- Leptopteromyia americana Hardy, 1947^{i c g b}
- Leptopteromyia brasilae Martin, 1971^{c g}
- Leptopteromyia colombiae Martin, 1971^{c g}
- Leptopteromyia gracilis Williston, 1908^{c g}
- Leptopteromyia lopesi Martin, 1971^{c g}
- Leptopteromyia mexicanae Martin, 1971^{c g}
- Leptopteromyia peruae Martin, 1971^{c g}

Data sources: i = ITIS, c = Catalogue of Life, g = GBIF, b = Bugguide.net
