= Laphystia flavipes =

Scientific classification
- Domain: Eukaryota
- Kingdom: Animalia
- Phylum: Arthropoda
- Class: Insecta
- Order: Diptera
- Family: Asilidae
- Genus: Laphystia
- Species: L. flavipes

Binomial name
- Laphystia flavipes Coquillett, 1904

Species of fly

Laphystia flavipes is a species of robber flies in the family Asilidae.
