= Leptogaster virgata =

Scientific classification
- Domain: Eukaryota
- Kingdom: Animalia
- Phylum: Arthropoda
- Class: Insecta
- Order: Diptera
- Family: Asilidae
- Genus: Leptogaster
- Species: L. virgata

Binomial name
- Leptogaster virgata Coquillett, 1904

Synonyms
- Leptogaster virgatus Coquillett, 1904

Species of fly

Leptogaster virgata is a species of robber flies in the family Asilidae.
