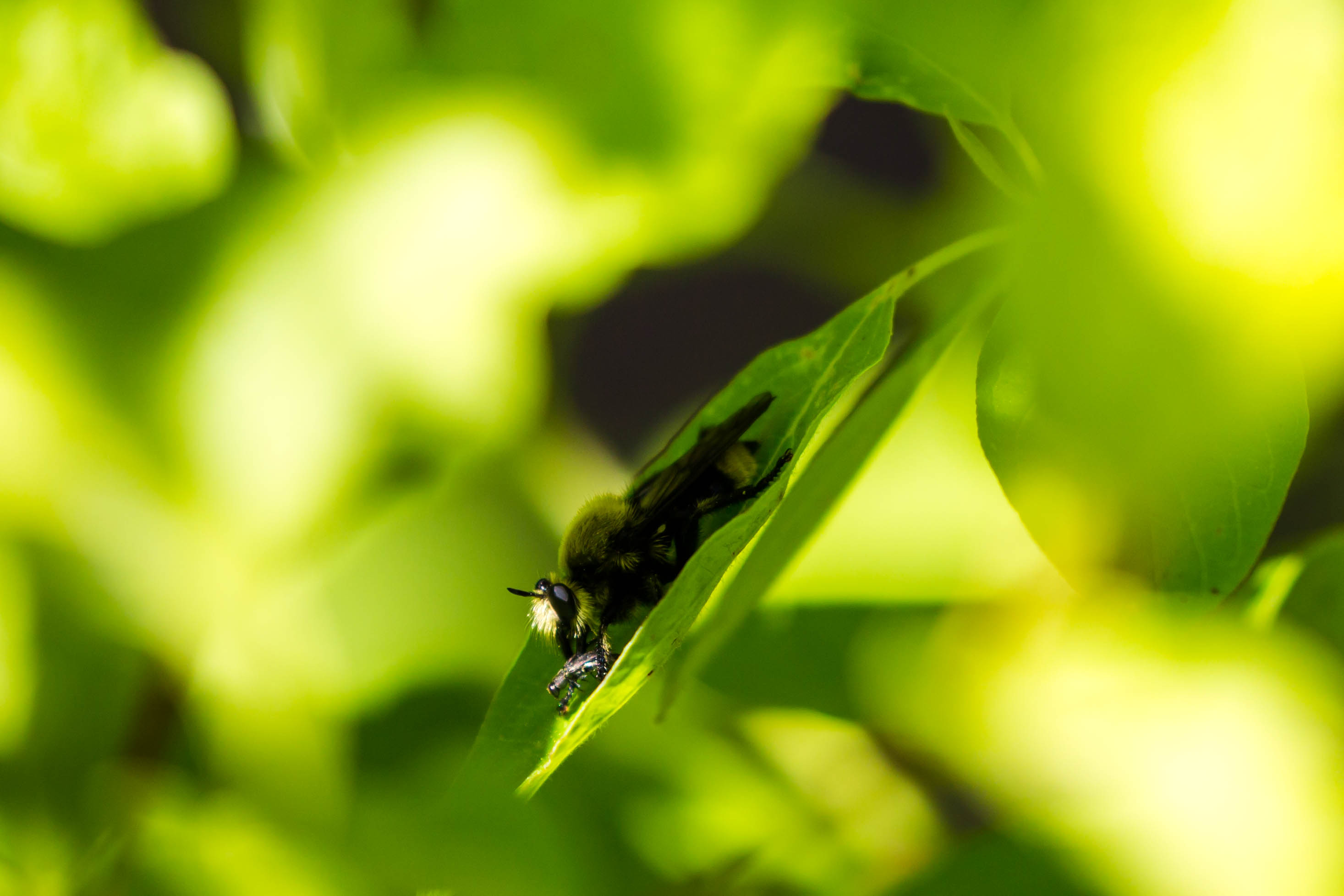

Scientific classification
- Domain: Eukaryota
- Kingdom: Animalia
- Phylum: Arthropoda
- Class: Insecta
- Order: Diptera
- Family: Asilidae
- Genus: Laphria
- Species: L. astur

Binomial name
- Laphria astur Osten Sacken, 1877

Synonyms
- Dasyllis californica Banks, 1917

= Laphria astur =

Species of fly

Laphria astur is a species of robber flies in the family Asilidae.
