= Leptogaster brevicornis =

Scientific classification
- Domain: Eukaryota
- Kingdom: Animalia
- Phylum: Arthropoda
- Class: Insecta
- Order: Diptera
- Family: Asilidae
- Genus: Leptogaster
- Species: L. brevicornis

Binomial name
- Leptogaster brevicornis Loew, 1872

Species of insect

Leptogaster brevicornis is a species of robber flies in the family Asilidae.
