= Lestomyia strigipes =

Scientific classification
- Domain: Eukaryota
- Kingdom: Animalia
- Phylum: Arthropoda
- Class: Insecta
- Order: Diptera
- Family: Asilidae
- Genus: Lestomyia
- Species: L. strigipes

Binomial name
- Lestomyia strigipes Curran, 1931

Species of fly

Lestomyia strigipes is a species of robber flies in the family Asilidae.
