= Laphystia ochreifrons =

Scientific classification
- Domain: Eukaryota
- Kingdom: Animalia
- Phylum: Arthropoda
- Class: Insecta
- Order: Diptera
- Family: Asilidae
- Genus: Laphystia
- Species: L. ochreifrons

Binomial name
- Laphystia ochreifrons Curran, 1931

Species of fly

Laphystia ochreifrons is a species of robber flies in the family Asilidae.
