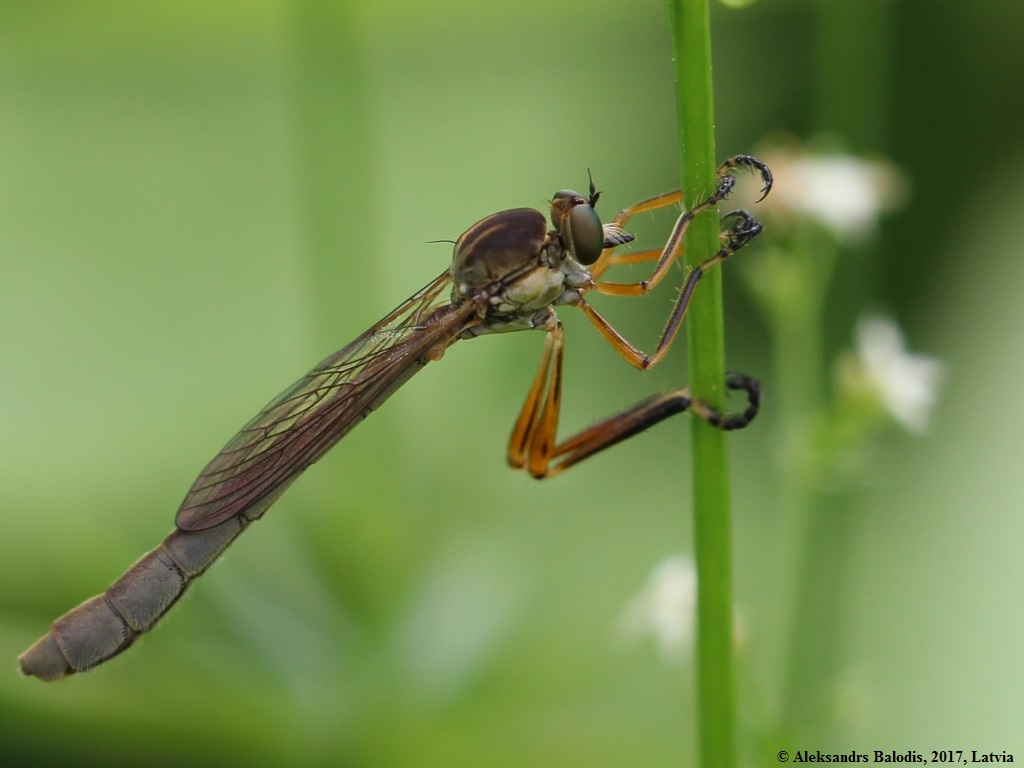
- Leptogaster cylindrica

Scientific classification
- Domain: Eukaryota
- Kingdom: Animalia
- Phylum: Arthropoda
- Class: Insecta
- Order: Diptera
- Family: Asilidae
- Subfamily: Leptogastrinae

= Leptogastrinae =

Subfamily of flies

Leptogastrinae is a subfamily of robber flies in the family Asilidae. There are more than 450 described species in Leptogastrinae.

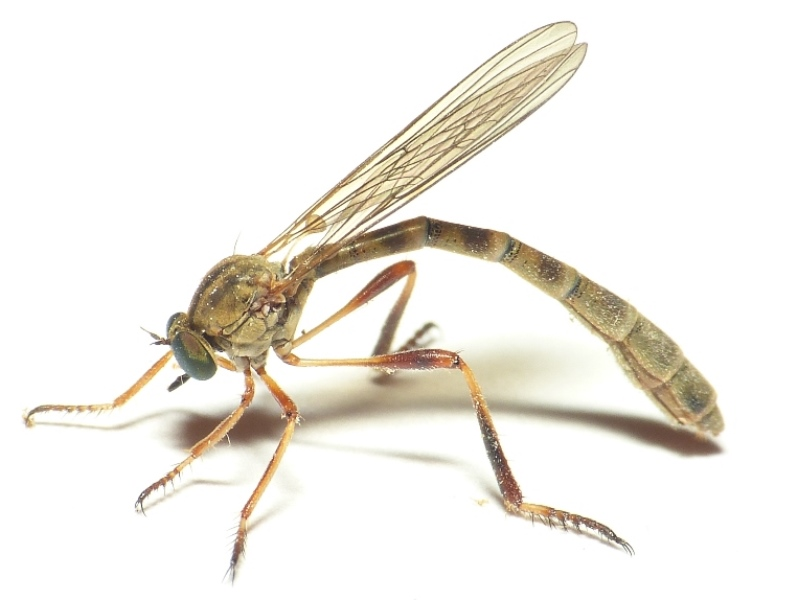
Leptogaster guttiventris

== Genera ==
- Acronyches Williston, 1908
- Ammophilomima Enderlein, 1914
- Apachekolos Martin, 1957
- Beameromyia Martin, 1957
- Eurhabdus Aldrich, 1923
- Euscelidia Westwood, 1850
- Lagynogaster Hermann, 1917
- Lasiocnemus Loew, 1851
- Leptogaster Meigen, 1803
- Leptopteromyia Williston, 1907
- Lobus Martin, 1972
- Mesoleptogaster Frey, 1937
- Ophionomima Enderlein, 1914
- Psilonyx Aldrich, 1923
- Schildia Aldrich, 1923
- Sinopsilonyx Hsia, 1949
- Systologaster Papavero, 2009
- Tipulogaster Cockerell, 1913
- † Cretagaster Dikow and Grimaldi, 2014
