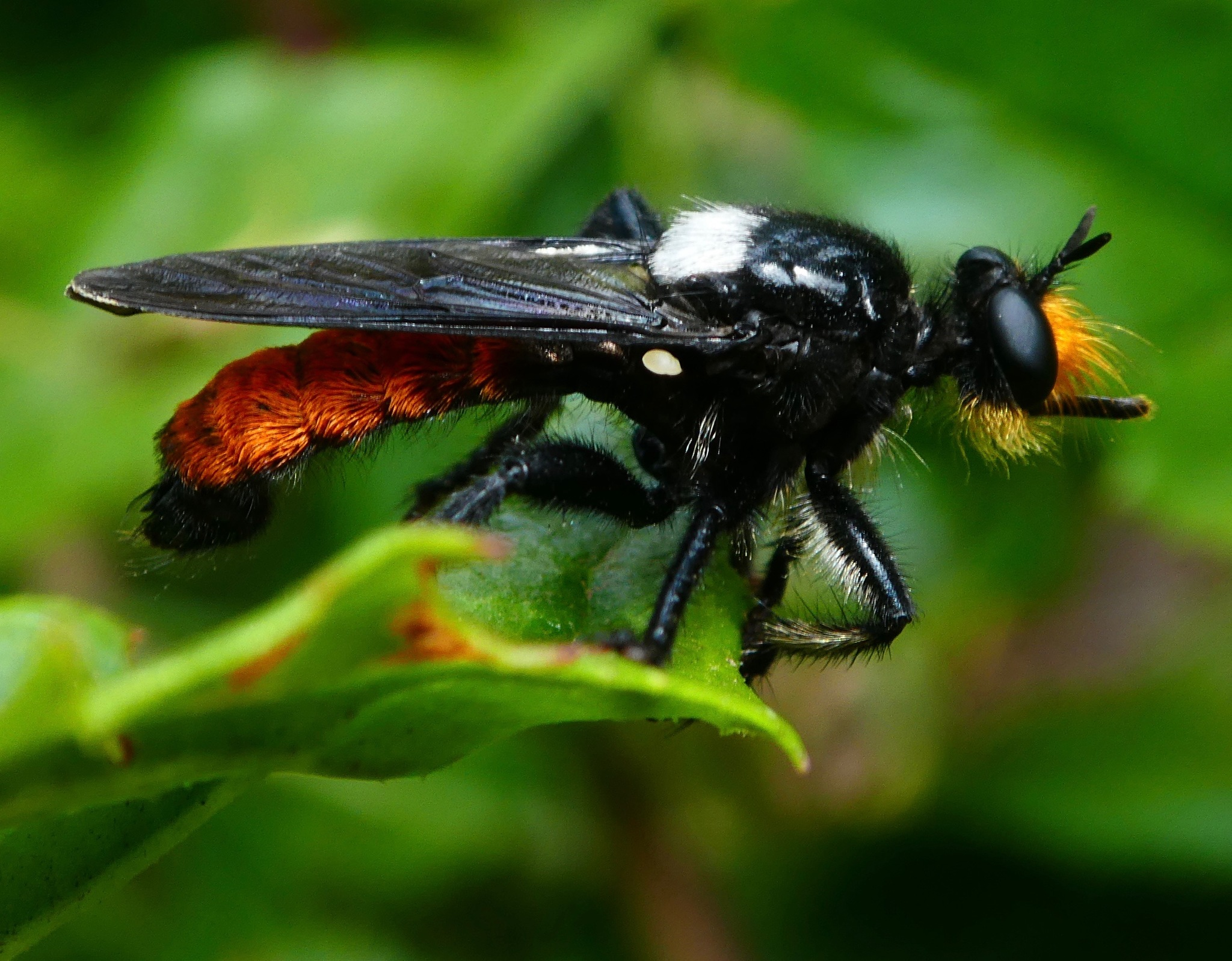

Scientific classification
- Domain: Eukaryota
- Kingdom: Animalia
- Phylum: Arthropoda
- Class: Insecta
- Order: Diptera
- Family: Asilidae
- Genus: Laphria
- Species: L. trux

Binomial name
- Laphria trux Mcatee, 1919

Synonyms
- Laphria audax McAtee, 1919

= Laphria trux =

Species of fly

Laphria trux is a species of robber fly in the family Asilidae.
