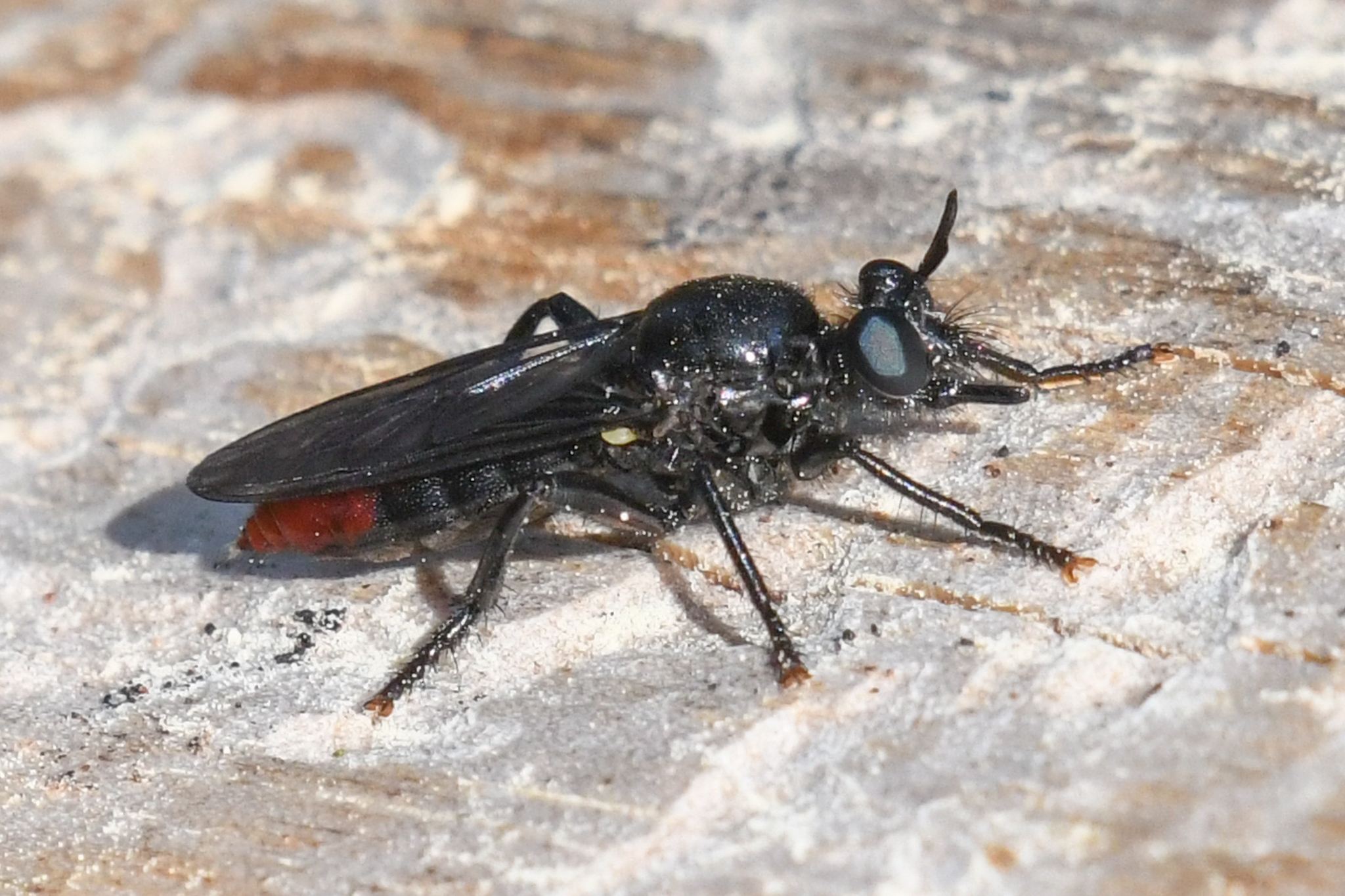
- Laphria felis, Canada

Scientific classification
- Domain: Eukaryota
- Kingdom: Animalia
- Phylum: Arthropoda
- Class: Insecta
- Order: Diptera
- Family: Asilidae
- Genus: Laphria
- Species: L. felis

Binomial name
- Laphria felis (Osten Sacken, 1877)

Synonyms
- Laphria atripes McAtee, 1919; Laphria crocea McAtee, 1919; Laphria varipes McAtee, 1919; Laphria xanthippe Williston, 1883

= Laphria felis =

Species of fly

Laphria felis is a species of robber fly in the family Asilidae, found in western North America.
