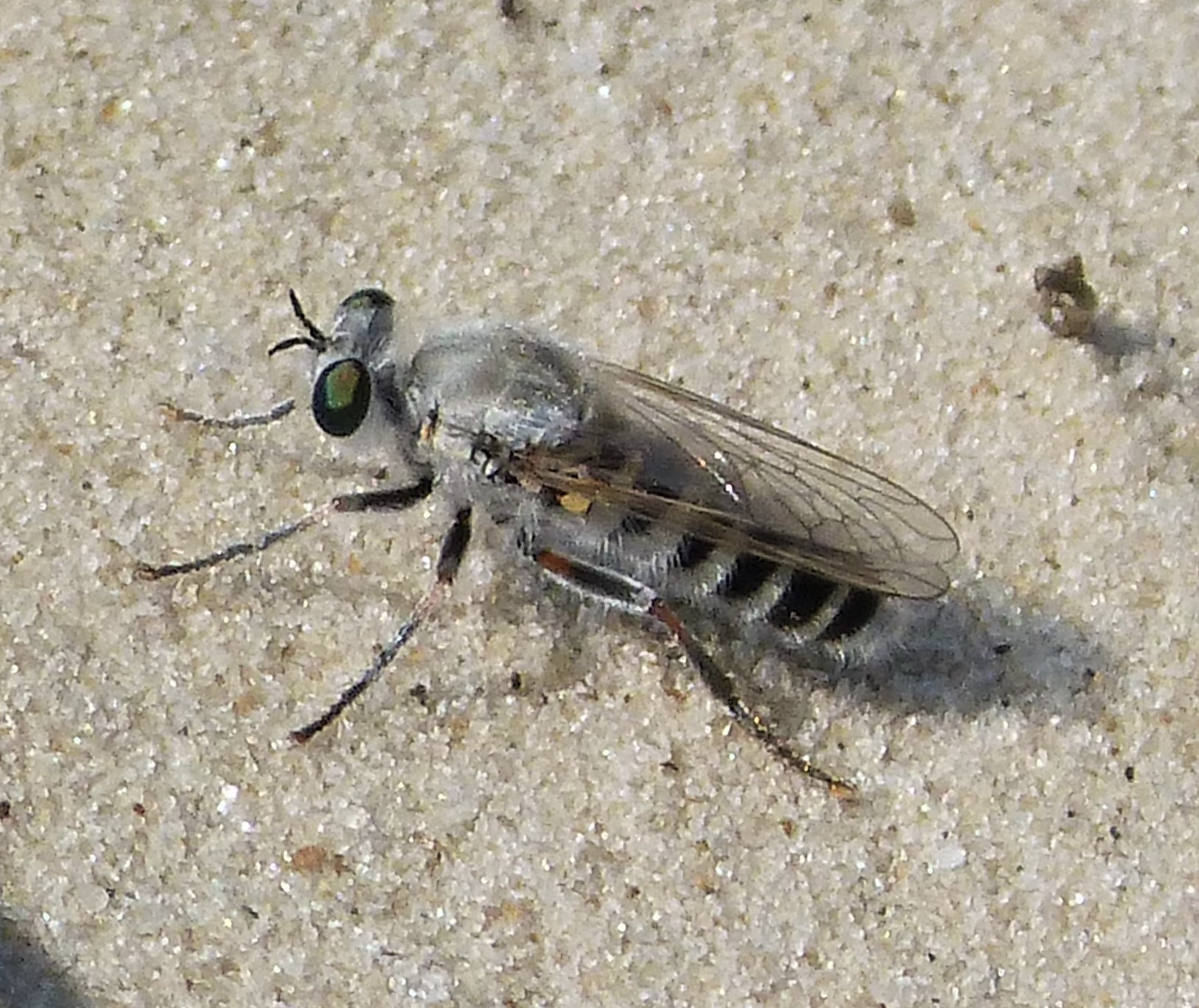

Scientific classification
- Domain: Eukaryota
- Kingdom: Animalia
- Phylum: Arthropoda
- Class: Insecta
- Order: Diptera
- Family: Asilidae
- Genus: Laphystia
- Species: L. litoralis

Binomial name
- Laphystia litoralis Curran, 1931

= Laphystia litoralis =

Species of fly

Laphystia litoralis is a species of robber flies in the family Asilidae.
