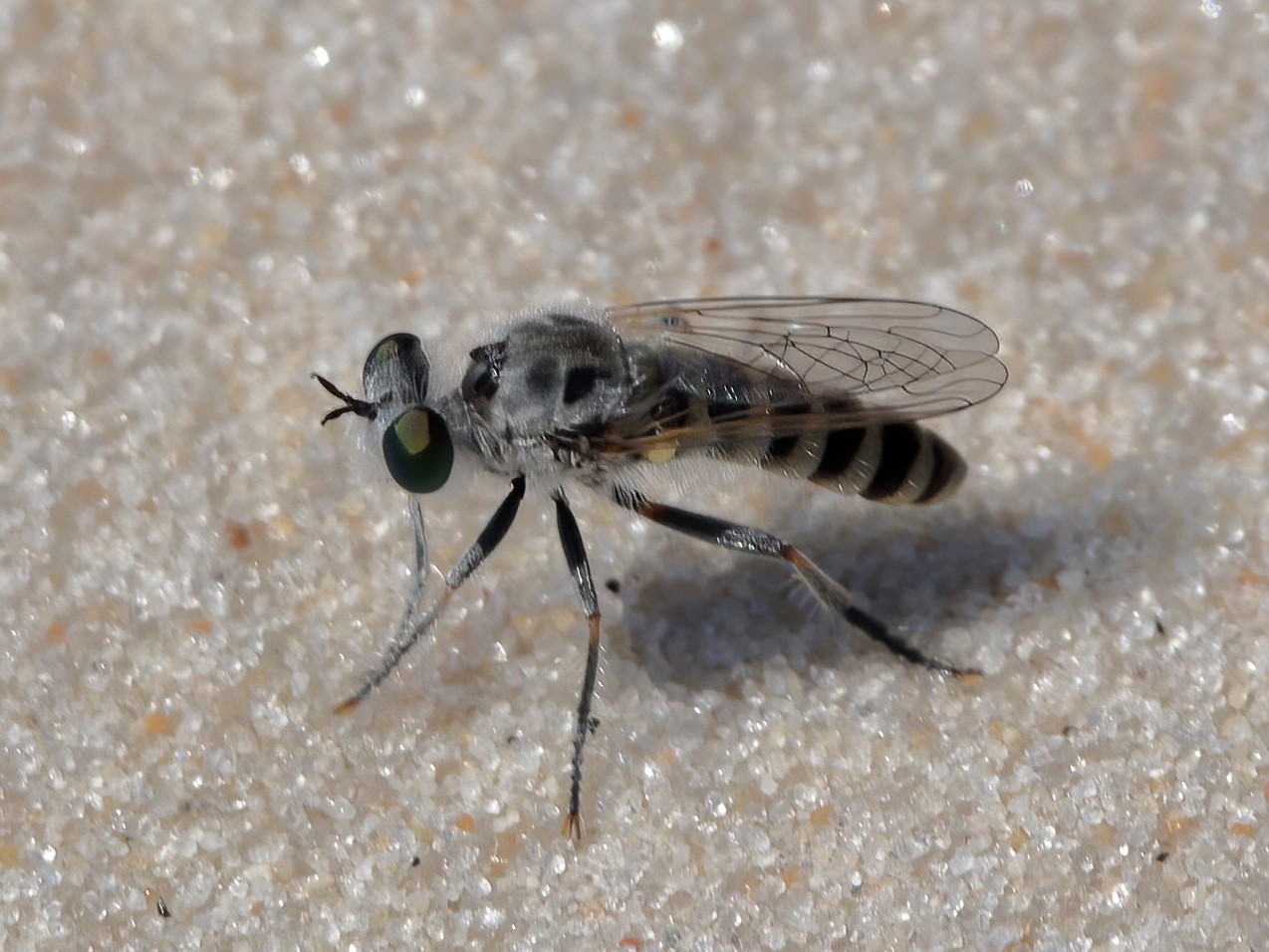

Scientific classification
- Domain: Eukaryota
- Kingdom: Animalia
- Phylum: Arthropoda
- Class: Insecta
- Order: Diptera
- Family: Asilidae
- Genus: Laphystia
- Species: L. texensis

Binomial name
- Laphystia texensis Curran, 1931

= Laphystia texensis =

Species of fly

Laphystia texensis is a species of robber fly in the family Asilidae.
