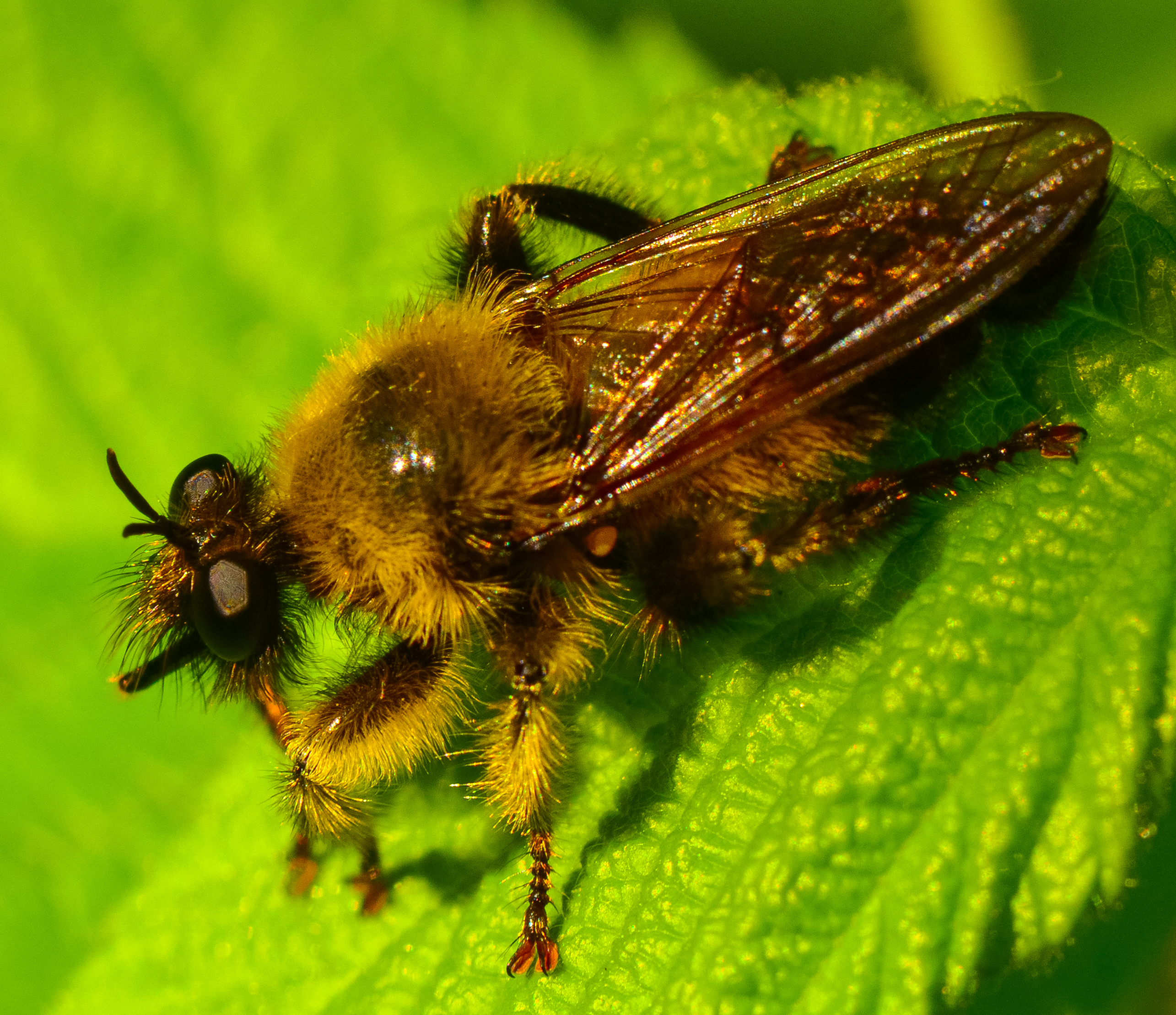

Scientific classification
- Kingdom: Animalia
- Phylum: Arthropoda
- Class: Insecta
- Order: Diptera
- Family: Asilidae
- Genus: Laphria
- Species: L. sacrator

Binomial name
- Laphria sacrator Walker, 1849

= Laphria sacrator =

Species of fly

Laphria sacrator, or Bee-mimic robberfly, is a species of robber flies in the family Asilidae. They have been spotted in some regions in Wisconsin.

== Appearance ==
Laphria sacrator appears as a winged bug with yellow hairs on the mystax, thorax, and some of the abdomen, with some red hairs.
