= Leptopteromyia americana =

Scientific classification
- Domain: Eukaryota
- Kingdom: Animalia
- Phylum: Arthropoda
- Class: Insecta
- Order: Diptera
- Family: Asilidae
- Genus: Leptopteromyia
- Species: L. americana

Binomial name
- Leptopteromyia americana Hardy, 1947

Species of fly

Leptopteromyia americana is a species of robber flies in the family Asilidae.
