= Leptogaster murina =

Scientific classification
- Domain: Eukaryota
- Kingdom: Animalia
- Phylum: Arthropoda
- Class: Insecta
- Order: Diptera
- Family: Asilidae
- Genus: Leptogaster
- Species: L. murina

Binomial name
- Leptogaster murina Loew, 1862

Synonyms
- Leptogaster murinus Loew, 1862

Species of fly

Leptogaster murina is a species of robber flies in the family Asilidae.
