= Laphystia notata =

Scientific classification
- Domain: Eukaryota
- Kingdom: Animalia
- Phylum: Arthropoda
- Class: Insecta
- Order: Diptera
- Family: Asilidae
- Genus: Laphystia
- Species: L. notata

Binomial name
- Laphystia notata (Bigot, 1878)

Synonyms
- Triclis notata Bigot, 1878

Species of fly

Laphystia notata is a species of robber flies in the family Asilidae.
