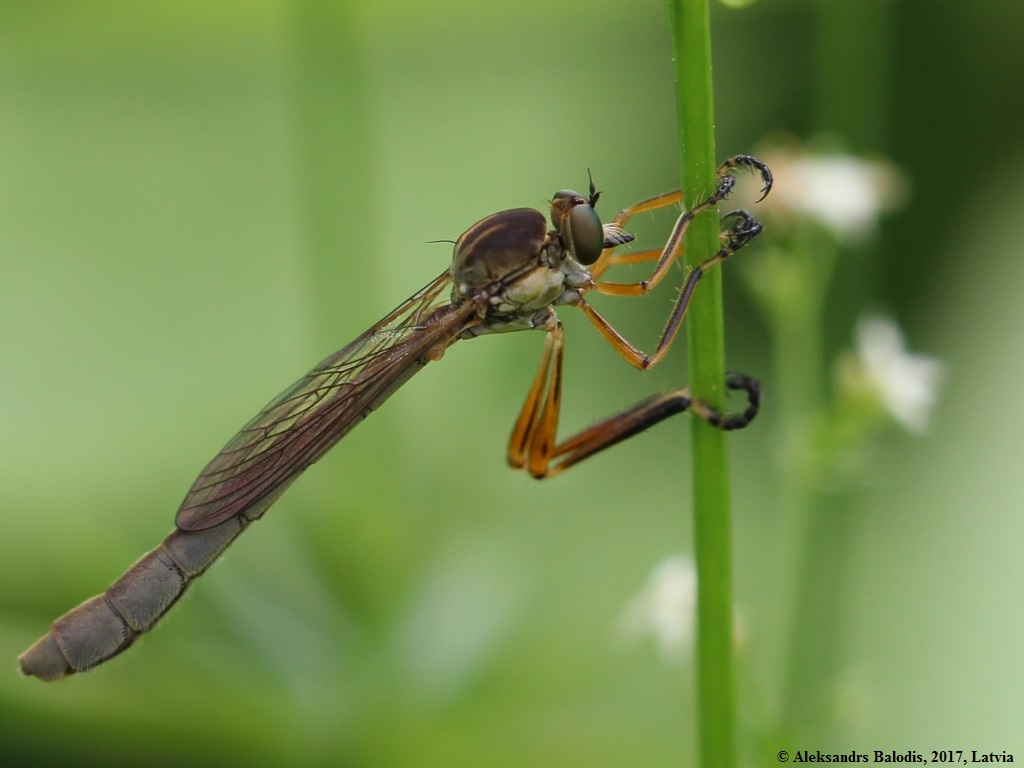
- Leptogaster cylindrica

Scientific classification
- Domain: Eukaryota
- Kingdom: Animalia
- Phylum: Arthropoda
- Class: Insecta
- Order: Diptera
- Family: Asilidae
- Subfamily: Leptogastrinae
- Genus: Leptogaster; Meigen, 1803

Diversity
- at least 270 species

= Leptogaster =

Genus of flies

Leptogaster is a genus of robber flies in the family Asilidae. There are at least 260 described species in Leptogaster.

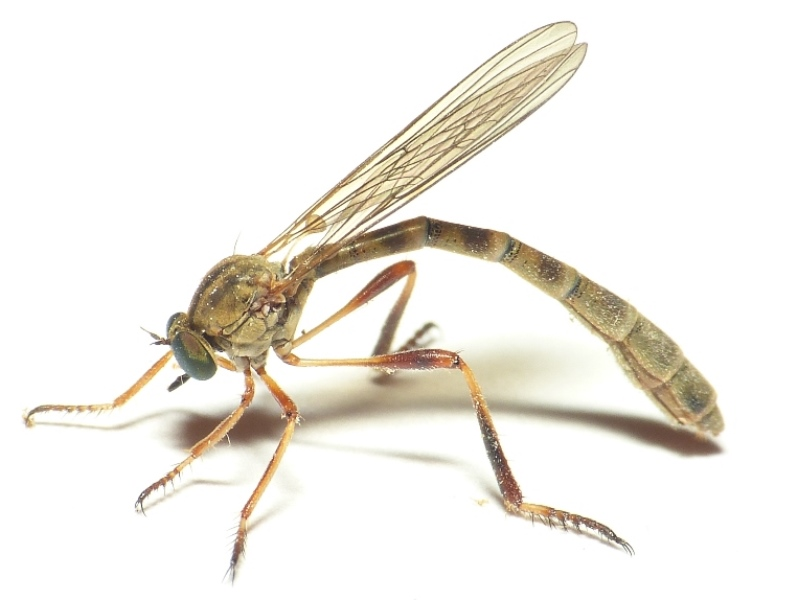
Leptogaster guttiventris

== See also ==
- List of Leptogaster species
