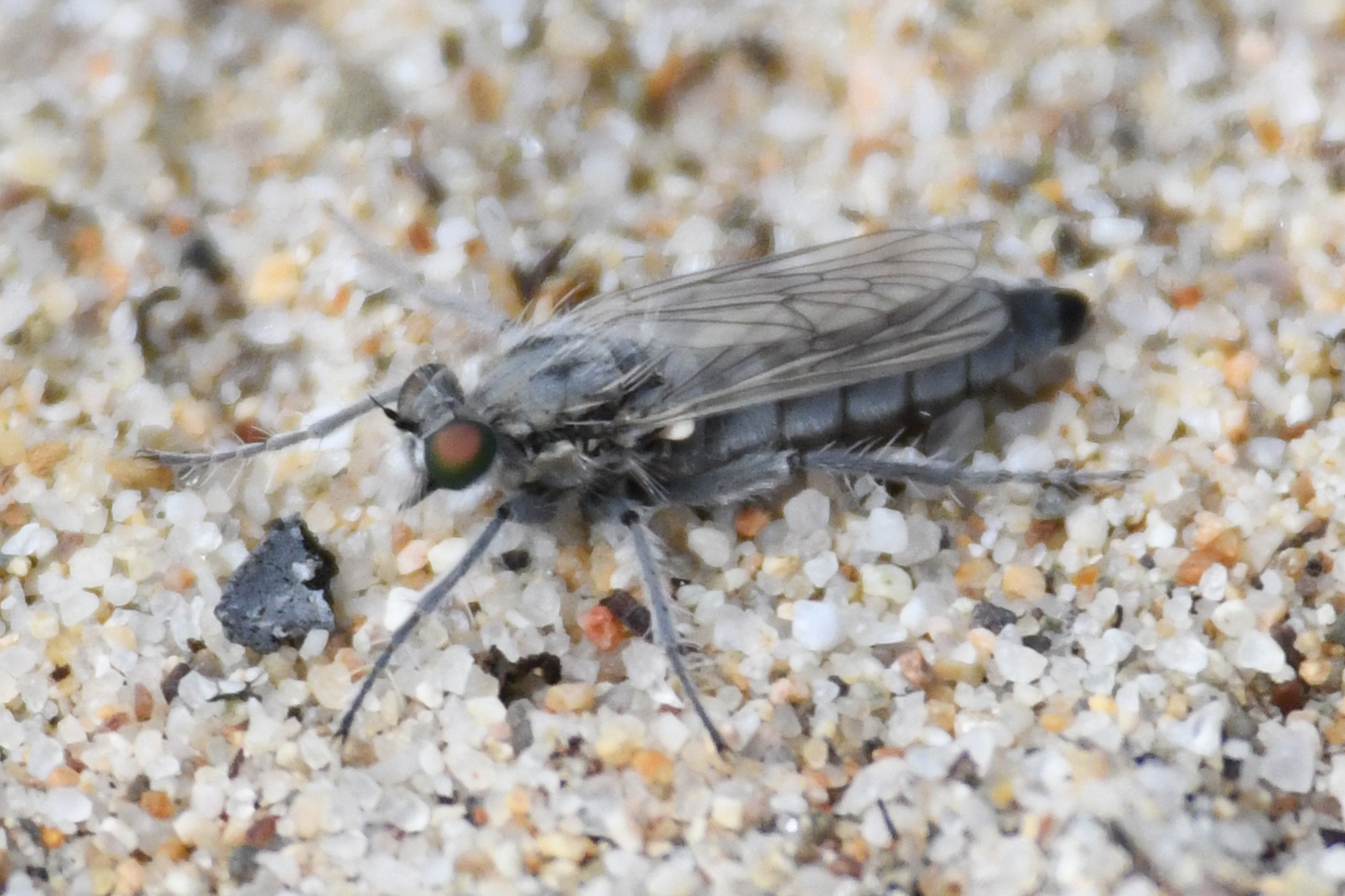

Scientific classification
- Domain: Eukaryota
- Kingdom: Animalia
- Phylum: Arthropoda
- Class: Insecta
- Order: Diptera
- Family: Asilidae
- Genus: Lasiopogon
- Species: L. littoris

Binomial name
- Lasiopogon littoris Cole, 1924

= Lasiopogon littoris =

Species of fly

Lasiopogon littoris is a species of robber fly in the family Asilidae.
