= Lasiopogon fumipennis =

Scientific classification
- Domain: Eukaryota
- Kingdom: Animalia
- Phylum: Arthropoda
- Class: Insecta
- Order: Diptera
- Family: Asilidae
- Genus: Lasiopogon
- Species: L. fumipennis

Binomial name
- Lasiopogon fumipennis Melander, 1923

Synonyms
- Lasiopogon coloradensis Cole and Wilcox, 1938; Lasiopogon olympia Cole and Wilcox, 1938

Species of fly

Lasiopogon fumipennis is a species of robber flies in the family Asilidae.
