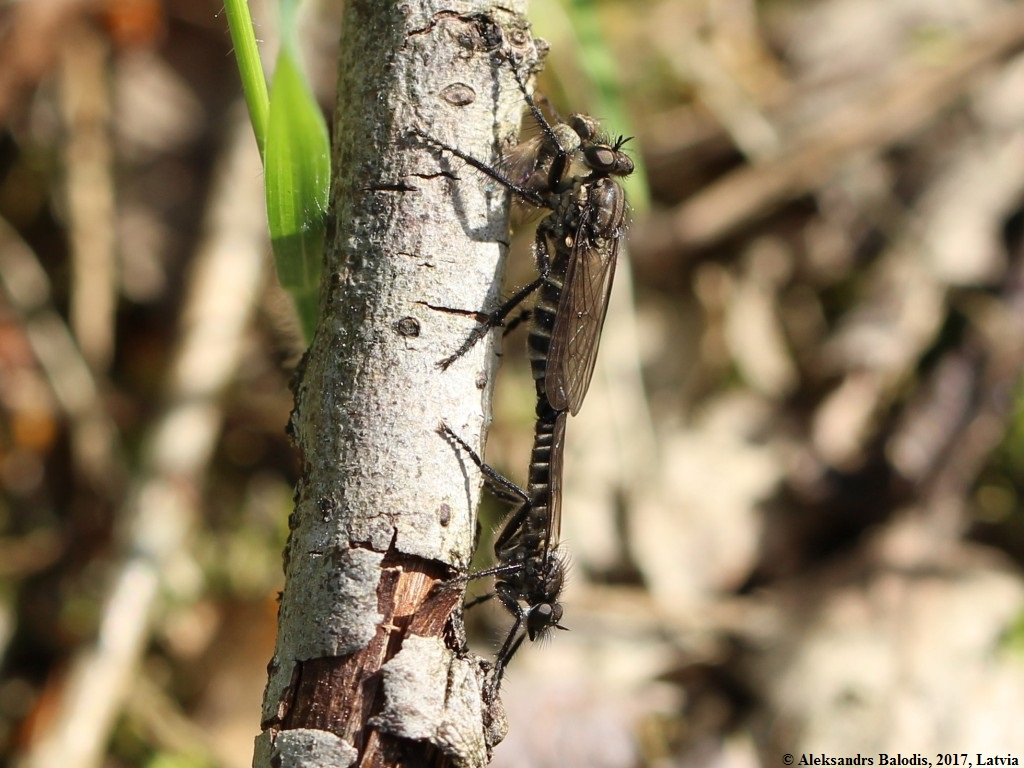
- Lasiopogon cinctus, Latvia

Scientific classification
- Kingdom: Animalia
- Phylum: Arthropoda
- Clade: Pancrustacea
- Class: Insecta
- Order: Diptera
- Family: Asilidae
- Genus: Lasiopogon
- Species: L. cinctus

Binomial name
- Lasiopogon cinctus (Fabricius, 1781)

= Lasiopogon cinctus =

Species of fly

Lasiopogon cinctus is a Palearctic species of robber fly in the family Asilidae.

== Identification ==
Difficult to distinguish from other Dioctria. Wolff, Gebel and Geller-Grimm (2021), ( Majer (1997), van den Broek (1979), Stubbs and Drake (2001) all provide keys, descriptions and illustrations. Older works are also useful eg. Seguy (1920) BHL Full text with illustrations</ref>
