= Lasiopogon bivittatus =

Scientific classification
- Domain: Eukaryota
- Kingdom: Animalia
- Phylum: Arthropoda
- Class: Insecta
- Order: Diptera
- Family: Asilidae
- Genus: Lasiopogon
- Species: L. bivittatus

Binomial name
- Lasiopogon bivittatus Loew, 1866

Species of fly

Lasiopogon bivittatus is a species of robber flies in the family Asilidae.
