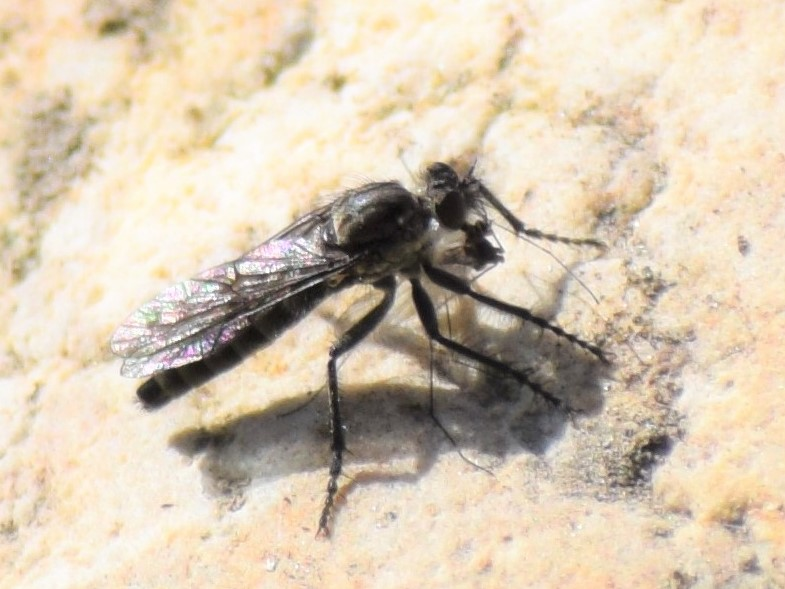

Scientific classification
- Kingdom: Animalia
- Phylum: Arthropoda
- Class: Insecta
- Order: Diptera
- Family: Asilidae
- Genus: Lasiopogon
- Species: L. hinei

Binomial name
- Lasiopogon hinei Cole & Wilcox, 1938

= Lasiopogon hinei =

Species of fly

Lasiopogon hinei is a species of robber fly in the family Asilidae.
