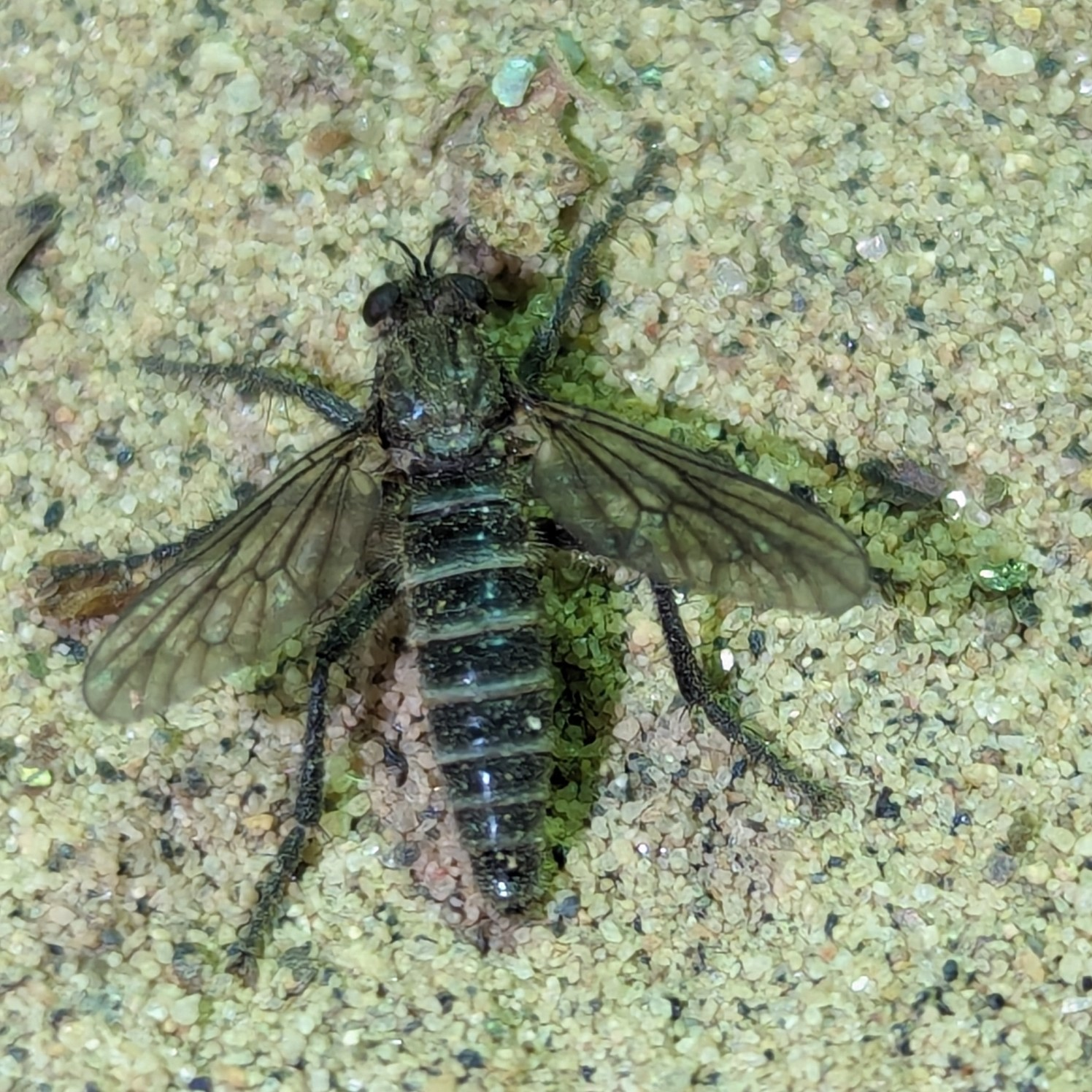

Scientific classification
- Domain: Eukaryota
- Kingdom: Animalia
- Phylum: Arthropoda
- Class: Insecta
- Order: Diptera
- Family: Asilidae
- Genus: Lasiopogon
- Species: L. tetragrammus

Binomial name
- Lasiopogon tetragrammus Loew, 1874

= Lasiopogon tetragrammus =

Species of fly

Lasiopogon tetragrammus is a species of robber fly in the family Asilidae.
