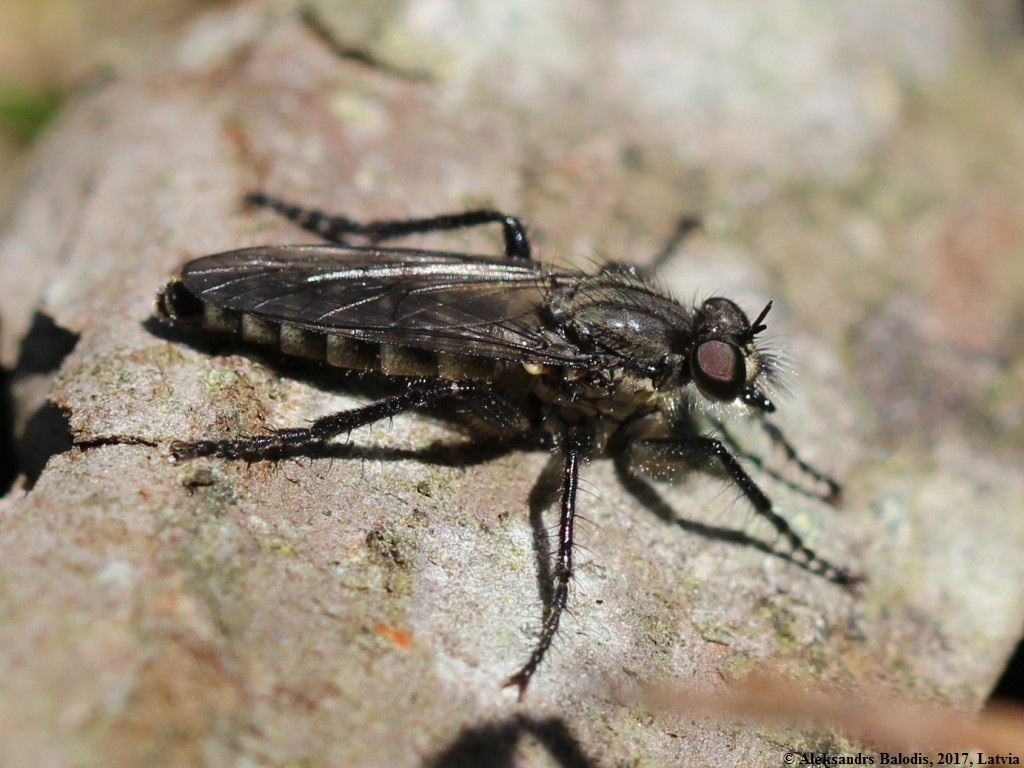
- Lasiopogon cinctus

Scientific classification
- Kingdom: Animalia
- Phylum: Arthropoda
- Clade: Pancrustacea
- Class: Insecta
- Order: Diptera
- Family: Asilidae
- Subfamily: Stichopogoninae
- Genus: Lasiopogon; Loew, 1847

= Lasiopogon (fly) =

Genus of flies

Lasiopogon is a genus of robber flies in the family Asilidae. There are at least 80 described species in the genus Lasiopogon.

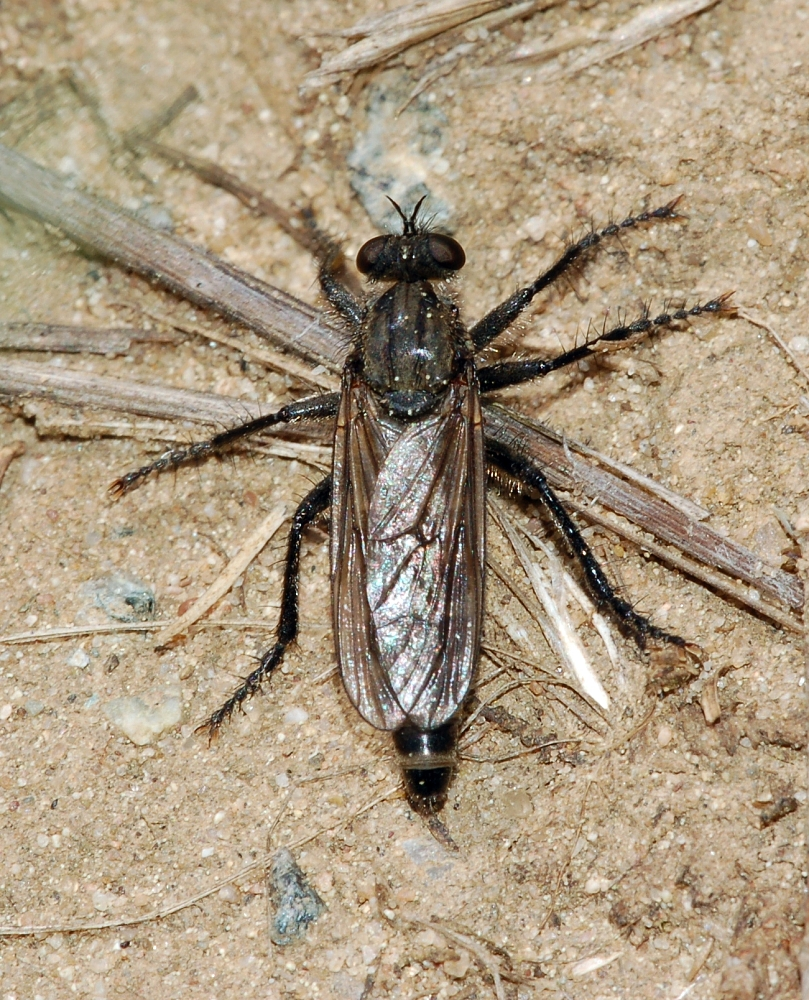
Lasiopogon cinctus

== Species ==
These species belong to the genus Lasiopogon:

- Lasiopogon actius (Melander, 1923)^{b}
- Lasiopogon akaishii Hradsky, 1981^{c g}
- Lasiopogon albidus Cole and Wilcox, 1938^{i c g}
- Lasiopogon aldrichii Melander, 1923^{i c g b}
- Lasiopogon anaphlecter McKnight, 2020^{c g}
- Lasiopogon apache Cannings, 2002^{c g b}
- Lasiopogon apenninus Bezzi, 1921^{c g}
- Lasiopogon apoecus McKnight, 2020^{c g}
- Lasiopogon appalachensis Cannings, 2002^{c g b}
- Lasiopogon arenicola (Osten Sacken, 1877)^{c g} (See Note 2 for ^{i}).
- Lasiopogon asilomar McKnight, 2020^{c g}
- Lasiopogon avetianae Richter, 1962^{c g}
- Lasiopogon bezzii Engel, 1929^{c g}
- Lasiopogon bitumineus McKnight, 2020^{c g}
- Lasiopogon bivittatus Loew, 1866^{i c g b}
- Lasiopogon californicus Cole and Wilcox, 1938^{i c g}
- Lasiopogon canningsi McKnight, 2020^{c g b}
- Lasiopogon canus Cole and Wilcox, 1938^{i c g}
- Lasiopogon chaetosus Cole and Wilcox, 1938^{i c g}
- Lasiopogon chrysotus Cannings, 2002^{c g}
- Lasiopogon cinctus (Fabricius, 1781)^{c g}
- Lasiopogon cinereus Cole, 1919^{i c g b}
- Lasiopogon coconino Cannings, 2002^{c g}
- Lasiopogon condylophorus McKnight, 2020^{c g}
- Lasiopogon currani Cole & Wilcox, 1938^{i c g b}
- Lasiopogon delicatulus Melander, 1923^{i c g}
- Lasiopogon dimicki Cole and Wilcox, 1938^{i c g}
- Lasiopogon drabicolus Cole, 1916^{g b} (See Note 1 for ^{c, i}).
- Lasiopogon eichingeri Hradsky, 1981^{c g}
- Lasiopogon esau McKnight, 2020^{c g}
- Lasiopogon flammeus Cannings, 2002^{c g}
- Lasiopogon fumipennis Melander, 1923^{i c g b}
- Lasiopogon gabrieli Cole & Wilcox, 1938^{i c g b}
- Lasiopogon gracilipes Bezzi, 1916^{c g}
- Lasiopogon hasanicus Lehr, 1984^{c g}
- Lasiopogon hinei Cole & Wilcox, 1938^{i c g b}
- Lasiopogon hirtellus (Meigen, 1820)^{c g}
- Lasiopogon immaculatus Strobl, 1893^{c g}
- Lasiopogon karli McKnight, 2020^{c g}
- Lasiopogon kjachtensis Lehr, 1984^{c g}
- Lasiopogon lavignei Cannings, 2002^{c g}
- Lasiopogon lehri Cannings, 2002^{c g}
- Lasiopogon leleji Cannings, 2002^{c g}
- Lasiopogon littoris Cole, 1924^{i c g b}
- Lasiopogon macquarti (Perris, 1852)^{c g}
- Lasiopogon marshalli Cannings, 2002^{c g}
- Lasiopogon martinorum Cole & Wilcox, 1938^{c g}
- Lasiopogon montanus Schiner, 1862^{c g}
- Lasiopogon monticola Melander, 1923^{c g} (See Note 2 for ^{i}).
- Lasiopogon nelsoni McKnight, 2020^{c g}
- Lasiopogon novus Lehr, 1984^{c g}
- Lasiopogon odontotus McKnight, 2020^{c g}
- Lasiopogon oklahomensis Cole & Wilcox, 1938^{i c g b}
- Lasiopogon opaculus Loew, 1874^{i c g}
- Lasiopogon pacificus Cole and Wilcox, 1938^{i c g}
- Lasiopogon peusi Hradsky, 1982^{c g}
- Lasiopogon phaeothysanotus Cannings, 2002^{c g}
- Lasiopogon piestolophus Cannings, 2002^{c g}
- Lasiopogon pilosellus Loew, 1847^{c g}
- Lasiopogon polensis Lavigne, 1969^{i c g}
- Lasiopogon primus Adisoemarto, 1967^{i c g}
- Lasiopogon pugeti Cole and Wilcox, 1938^{i c g}
- Lasiopogon puyallupi Cole & Wilcox 1938^{c g}
- Lasiopogon qinghaiensis Cannings, 2002^{c g}
- Lasiopogon quadrivittatus Jones, 1907^{i c g b}
- Lasiopogon ripicola Melander, 1923 (See Note 2 for ^{i g}).
- Lasiopogon rokuroi Hradsky, 1981^{c g}
- Lasiopogon schizopygus Cannings, 2002^{c g b}
- Lasiopogon septentrionalis Lehr, 1984^{c g}
- Lasiopogon shermani Cole and Wilcox, 1938^{i c g}
- Lasiopogon sierra McKnight, 2020^{c g}
- Lasiopogon slossonae Cole & Wilcox, 1938^{i c g b}
- Lasiopogon soffneri Hradsky, 1964^{c g}
- Lasiopogon solox Enderlein, 1914^{c g}
- Lasiopogon tarsalis Loew, 1847^{c g}
- Lasiopogon terneicus Lehr, 1984^{c g}
- Lasiopogon terricola (Johnson, 1900)^{c g b} (See Note 2 for ^{i}).
- Lasiopogon testaceus Cole and Wilcox, 1938^{i c g}
- Lasiopogon tetragrammus Loew, 1874^{i c g b}
- Lasiopogon trivittatus Melander, 1923^{i c g}
- Lasiopogon tumulicola McKnight, 2020^{c g}
- Lasiopogon tuvinus Richter, 1977^{c g}
- Lasiopogon wilcoxi McKnight, 2020^{c g}
- Lasiopogon willametti Cole & Wilcox, 1938^{i c g b}
- Lasiopogon woodorum Cannings, 2002^{c g}
- Lasiopogon yukonensis Cole and Wilcox, 1938^{i c g}
- Lasiopogon zaitzevi Lehr, 1984^{c g}
- Lasiopogon zonatus Cole and Wilcox, 1938^{i c g}

Data sources: i = ITIS, c = Catalogue of Life, g = GBIF, b = Bugguide.net

[Note 1: The Catalog of Life and ITIS database (as of June 2025) presents the valid name of this taxon as Lasiopogon drabicolus Cole, 1916 which is an arguably justified amendment of the protonym Lasiopogon drabicolum Cole, 1916, if interpreted as e.g. adjectival then inflected masculine for gender agreement. However, the epithet was elsewhere published in Melander, 1923 (etc) as Lasiopogon drabicola Cole, 1916, which could be argued to have prevailing usage, and for example interpreted as an invariant noun.]

[Note 2: ITIS database (as of June 2025) presents several others with the species epithet altered to a masculine inflection, however in these specified cases the protonym can be interpreted as an invariant noun, and therefore in listing above remain unchanged, from Daulopogon arenicola Osten Sacken, 1877, Lasiopogon monticola Melander, 1923, Lasiopogon ripicola Melander, 1923 and Daulopogon terricola Johnson, 1900]

[Note 3: ITIS database (as of June 2025) includes the following three species; Lasiopogon aridus Cole and Wilcox, 1938, Lasiopogon atripennis Cole and Wilcox, 1938 Lasiopogon carolinensis Cole and Wilcox, 1938 which are all synonyms of others as detailed in Cannings, 2002]
