= Metadioctria rubida =

Scientific classification
- Domain: Eukaryota
- Kingdom: Animalia
- Phylum: Arthropoda
- Class: Insecta
- Order: Diptera
- Family: Asilidae
- Genus: Metadioctria
- Species: M. rubida

Binomial name
- Metadioctria rubida (Coquillett, 1893)

Synonyms
- Dioctria atripes Wilcox and Martin, 1941; Dioctria nigripilosa Wilcox and Martin, 1941; Dioctria rubidus Coquillett, 1893

Species of fly

Metadioctria rubida is a species of robber flies in the family Asilidae.
