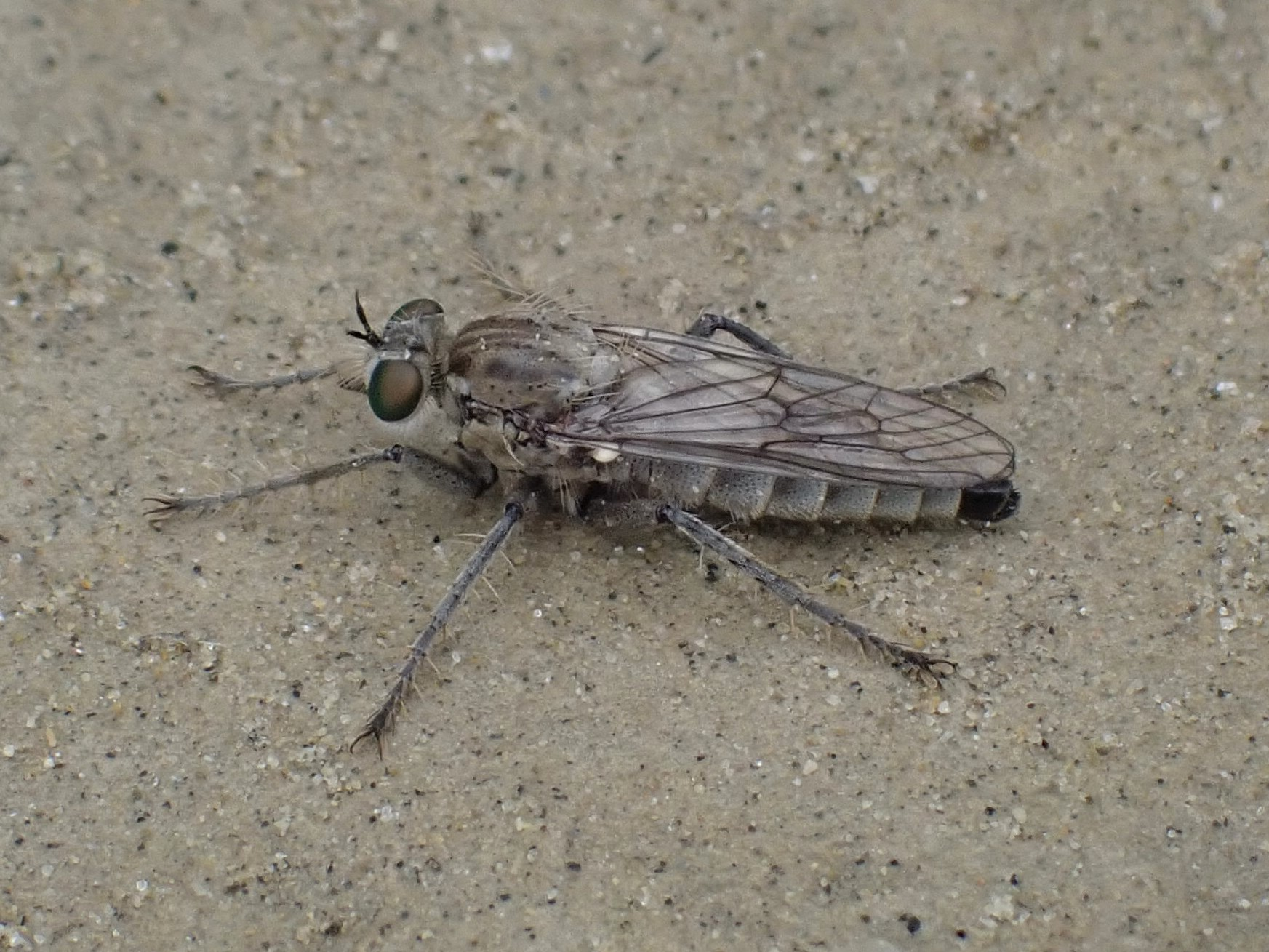

Scientific classification
- Domain: Eukaryota
- Kingdom: Animalia
- Phylum: Arthropoda
- Class: Insecta
- Order: Diptera
- Family: Asilidae
- Genus: Lasiopogon
- Species: L. quadrivittatus

Binomial name
- Lasiopogon quadrivittatus Jones, 1907

= Lasiopogon quadrivittatus =

Species of fly

Lasiopogon quadrivittatus is a species of robber flies in the family Asilidae.
