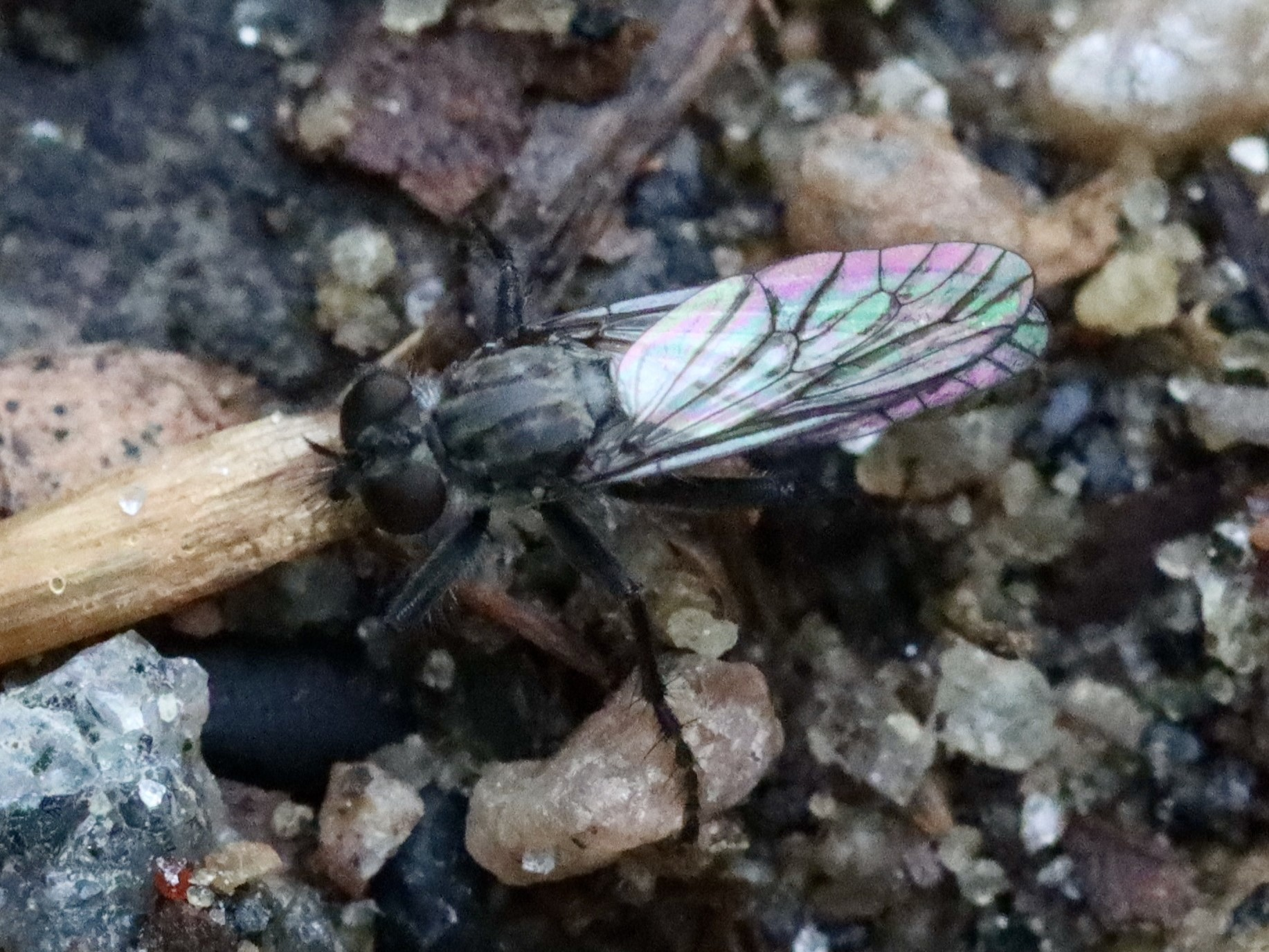

Scientific classification
- Domain: Eukaryota
- Kingdom: Animalia
- Phylum: Arthropoda
- Class: Insecta
- Order: Diptera
- Family: Asilidae
- Genus: Lasiopogon
- Species: L. currani

Binomial name
- Lasiopogon currani Cole & Wilcox, 1938

= Lasiopogon currani =

Species of fly

Lasiopogon currani is a species of robber fly in the family Asilidae.
