= Metadioctria parvula =

Scientific classification
- Domain: Eukaryota
- Kingdom: Animalia
- Phylum: Arthropoda
- Class: Insecta
- Order: Diptera
- Family: Asilidae
- Genus: Metadioctria
- Species: M. parvula

Binomial name
- Metadioctria parvula (Coquillett, 1893)

Synonyms
- Dioctria parvulus Coquillett, 1893

Species of fly

Metadioctria parvula is a species of robber flies in the family Asilidae. It is found in California.
