= Metadioctria =

Scientific classification
- Domain: Eukaryota
- Kingdom: Animalia
- Phylum: Arthropoda
- Class: Insecta
- Order: Diptera
- Family: Asilidae
- Subfamily: Stenopogoninae
- Genus: Metadioctria

Genus of flies

Metadioctria is a genus of robber flies in the family Asilidae. There are at least three described species in Metadioctria.

== Species ==
- Metadioctria parvula (Coquillett, 1893)
- Metadioctria resplendens (Loew, 1872)
- Metadioctria rubida (Coquillett, 1893)
