= Mesojassoides =

Mesojassoides Temporal range: Late Cretaceous

Scientific classification
- Domain: Eukaryota
- Kingdom: Animalia
- Phylum: Arthropoda
- Class: Insecta
- Order: Hemiptera
- Suborder: Auchenorrhyncha
- Family: Cicadellidae
- Subfamily: Errhomeninae
- Tribe: Bathysmatophorini
- Genus: †Mesojassoides; Oman, 1937
- Species: †M. gigantea

Binomial name
- †Mesojassoides gigantea Oman, 1937

Genus of true bugs

Mesojassoides is a genus of extinct leaf hopper from the Late Cretaceous, approximately 70 - 66 million years ago, Fox Hills Formation. The genus contains a single species Mesojassoides gigantea, described from a fore wing found in 1932 by C.H. Dane and W. G. Pierce in Adams County, Colorado. Described by Paul W. Oman in 1937, the genus was named for the similarity in vein structure between the holotype and the modern genus Jassus. The holotype specimen, National Museum of Natural History #75521, is 12 millimetres (0.47 in) long and nearly complete, missing the clavus and a small section of the costal margin. The specimen indicates M. gigantea was similar in size to the largest modern leaf hopper species.
