= List of Xestocephalus species =

This is a list of 129 species in Xestocephalus, a genus of leafhoppers in the family Cicadellidae.

== Xestocephalus species ==
- Xestocephalus abyssinicus Heller & Linnavuori 1968^{c g}
- Xestocephalus adiopodoumus Linnavuori 1979^{c g}
- Xestocephalus aethiopicus Melichar 1914^{c g}
- Xestocephalus agassizi Van Duzee 1912^{c g}
- Xestocephalus albidus Evans 1954^{c g}
- Xestocephalus albopunctatus Linnavuori 1959^{c g}
- Xestocephalus amenus DeLong, Wolda & Estribi 1980^{c g}
- Xestocephalus ancorifer Linnavuori 1959^{c g}
- Xestocephalus antimachus Linnavuori 1979^{c g}
- Xestocephalus antlerus DeLong, Wolda & Estribi 1980^{c g}
- Xestocephalus apicalis Melichar 1903^{c g}
- Xestocephalus aquilus DeLong, Wolda & Estribi 1983^{c g}
- Xestocephalus artarus DeLong, Wolda & Estribi 1980^{c g}
- Xestocephalus asper Linnavuori 1969^{c g}
- Xestocephalus australensis Kirkaldy 1907^{c g}
- Xestocephalus badius DeLong, Wolda & Estribi 1980^{c g}
- Xestocephalus balli Van Duzee 1907^{c g}
- Xestocephalus bicolor Matsumura 1914^{c g}
- Xestocephalus bicoloratus DeLong, Wolda & Estribi 1983^{c g}
- Xestocephalus bicornis Linnavuori 1969^{c g}
- Xestocephalus bifasciatus Cwikla & Wolda 1986^{c g}
- Xestocephalus bifidus DeLong & Linnavuori 1978^{c g}
- Xestocephalus binatus Cai & He^{c g}
- Xestocephalus bipunctatus Van Duzee 1907^{c g}
- Xestocephalus botelensis Matsumura 1940^{c g}
- Xestocephalus brunneus Van Duzee, 1907^{b} (brown xestocephalus)
- Xestocephalus bulbus Cwikla, 1985^{c g b}
- Xestocephalus canidia Linnavuori 1979^{c g}
- Xestocephalus cervinus DeLong, Wolda & Estribi 1980^{c g}
- Xestocephalus chibianus Matsumura 1940^{c g}
- Xestocephalus cinctus DeLong 1980^{c g}
- Xestocephalus cirus Evans 1955^{c g}
- Xestocephalus cognatus Choe 1981^{c g}
- Xestocephalus consentaneus Linnavuori 1979^{c g}
- Xestocephalus contortuplicatus Kirkaldy 1907^{c g}
- Xestocephalus coronatus Osborn & Ball 1897^{c g}
- Xestocephalus cristifer Logvinenko 1981^{c g}
- Xestocephalus culmus DeLong, Wolda & Estribi 1980^{c g}
- Xestocephalus curtus DeLong & Linnavuori 1978^{c g}
- Xestocephalus dedecus DeLong, Wolda & Estribi 1980^{c g}
- Xestocephalus delongi Cwikla 1985^{c g}
- Xestocephalus desertorum (Berg, 1879)^{c g b}
- Xestocephalus dimonika Linnavuori 1969^{c g}
- Xestocephalus dissimilis Distant 1918^{c g}
- Xestocephalus dubius DeLong 1982^{c g}
- Xestocephalus eumaios Linnavuori 1973^{c g}
- Xestocephalus fasciatus Evans 1954^{c g}
- Xestocephalus feowerpacchus Cwikla 1985^{c g}
- Xestocephalus fistutlus Cwikla 1985^{c g}
- Xestocephalus fucatus Evans 1954^{c g}
- Xestocephalus fulvocapitatus ^{b}
- Xestocephalus fulvus DeLong, Wolda & Estribi 1983^{c g}
- Xestocephalus fuscarus DeLong, Wolda & Estribi 1980^{c g}
- Xestocephalus fuscomaculatus Kamitani 2005^{c g}
- Xestocephalus fuscus Evans 1954^{c g}
- Xestocephalus guttulatus Motschulsky 1859^{c g}
- Xestocephalus igerna Linnavuori 1969^{c g}
- Xestocephalus iguchii Matsumura 1914^{c g}
- Xestocephalus immaculatus Linnavuori 1959^{c g}
- Xestocephalus irroratus Osborn 1924^{c g}
- Xestocephalus ishidae Matsumura 1914^{c g}
- Xestocephalus izzardi Metcalf 1955^{c g}
- Xestocephalus japonicus Ishihara 1961^{c g}
- Xestocephalus javanus Melichar 1914^{c g}
- Xestocephalus jucundus Linnavuori 1954^{c g}
- Xestocephalus koreanus Kwon 1981^{c g}
- Xestocephalus koshunensis Matsumura 1914^{c g}
- Xestocephalus kuyanianus Matsumura 1914^{c g}
- Xestocephalus longus Cwikla 1985^{c g}
- Xestocephalus lunatus Peters, 1933^{c g b}
- Xestocephalus luridus Linnavuori 1959^{c g}
- Xestocephalus maculatus Osborn 1929^{c g}
- Xestocephalus magnificus Evans 1966^{c g}
- Xestocephalus maquilingensis Merino 1936^{c g}
- Xestocephalus medius Linnavuori 1969^{c g}
- Xestocephalus mexicanus DeLong & Linnavuori 1978^{c g}
- Xestocephalus minimus China 1935^{c g}
- Xestocephalus miramari DeLong, Wolda & Estribi 1980^{c g}
- Xestocephalus montanus Matsumura 1914^{c g}
- Xestocephalus nigrifrons ^{b}
- Xestocephalus nikkoensis Matsumura 1914^{c g}
- Xestocephalus nilgiriensis Distant 1918^{c g}
- Xestocephalus ornatus Van Duzee 1907^{c g}
- Xestocephalus osborni Merino 1936^{c g}
- Xestocephalus ovalis Evans 1966^{c g}
- Xestocephalus paganurus Melichar 1903^{c g}
- Xestocephalus pallescens Linnavuori 1979^{c g}
- Xestocephalus pallidiceps Kirkaldy 1907^{c g}
- Xestocephalus panamanus DeLong, Wolda & Estribi 1983^{c g}
- Xestocephalus piceatus Osborn 1934^{c g}
- Xestocephalus piceus ^{b}
- Xestocephalus polleti Linnavuori 1979^{c g}
- Xestocephalus provancheri ^{b}
- Xestocephalus pulicarius Van Duzee, 1894^{g}
- Xestocephalus pullus DeLong, Wolda & Estribi 1983^{c g}
- Xestocephalus punctatus Caldwell 1952^{c g}
- Xestocephalus purpurascens Kirkaldy 1907^{c g}
- Xestocephalus quadripunctatus Linnavuori 1955^{c g}
- Xestocephalus ramulus DeLong & Linnavuori 1978^{c g}
- Xestocephalus reflexus Osborn 1934^{c g}
- Xestocephalus relatus Distant 1918^{c g}
- Xestocephalus ryukyuensis Kamitani 2005^{c g}
- Xestocephalus shikokuanus Ishihara 1961^{c g}
- Xestocephalus sidnicus Kirkaldy 1907^{c g}
- Xestocephalus similis ^{b}
- Xestocephalus sinchonus DeLong 1982^{c g}
- Xestocephalus spicatus DeLong & Linnavuori 1978^{c g}
- Xestocephalus spinestyleus Li & Dai 2003^{c g}
- Xestocephalus spinifer Linnavuori 1979^{c g}
- Xestocephalus spinosus Linnavuori 1957^{c g}
- Xestocephalus suakoko Linnavuori 1979^{c g}
- Xestocephalus subfusculus Melichar 1905^{c g}
- Xestocephalus subtessellatus Linnavuori 1959^{c g}
- Xestocephalus superbus (Provancher, 1890)^{b}
- Xestocephalus sycophantus Linnavuori 1979^{c g}
- Xestocephalus tangaensis Linnavuori 1979^{c g}
- Xestocephalus tasmaniensis Evans 1938^{c g}
- Xestocephalus tesselatus ^{b}
- Xestocephalus tessellatus Van Duzee 1894^{c g}
- Xestocephalus toroensis Matsumura 1914^{c g}
- Xestocephalus transversus Distant 1918^{c g}
- Xestocephalus triatus Caldwell 1952^{c g}
- Xestocephalus tucsoni Knull, 1944^{c g b}
- Xestocephalus tutuilanus Osborn 1934^{c g}
- Xestocephalus variarius DeLong 1982^{c g}
- Xestocephalus vitiensis Kirkaldy 1907^{c g}
- Xestocephalus vittanotus Cwikla & Wolda 1986^{c g}
- Xestocephalus youngi Cwikla 1985^{c g}
- Xestocephalus zambicus Linnavuori 1979^{c g}

Data sources: i = ITIS, c = Catalogue of Life, g = GBIF, b = Bugguide.net
