= Olga F. Linares =

Panamanian–American academic anthropologist and archaeologist

Olga Francesca Linares
- Born: November 10, 1936; David, Panama
- Died: December 2, 2014 (aged 78)
- Education: Harvard University
- Scientific career
- Fields: Anthropology, archaeology
- Workplaces: Smithsonian Tropical Research Institute
- Thesis: (1964)

Olga Francesca Linares (November 10, 1936 – December 2, 2014; formerly Olga Linares de Sapir) was a Panamanian–American academic anthropologist and archaeologist, and senior staff scientist (emerita) at the Smithsonian Tropical Research Institute (STRI) in Panama, who supported much of her research throughout her career. She is well known for her work on the cultural ecology of Panama, and more recently in the Casamance region of Southern Senegal. She is also concerned with the social organization of agrarian systems as well as the relationship between "ecology, political economy, migration and the changing dynamics of food production among rural peoples living in tropical regions".

== Family ==
Olga Linares was born November 10, 1936, in the city of David, Panama, the daughter of Francisco (Frank) Esteban Linares and Olga Tribaldos de Linares., She married her second husband Martin Moynihan, founding director of the Smithsonian Tropical Research Institute (STRI) and animal behaviorist, in 1973. Moynihan died on December 3, 1996. After having been widowed for many years, Linares married Fenwick “Fen” C. Riley in 2006 and lived in Panama until their deaths a few months apart in 2014.

== Educational background and training ==
=== Early education ===
Linares received her A.B. in Anthropology from Vassar College in 1958 and later completed her Ph.D. in anthropology from Harvard University in 1964.

=== Career related ===
Linares served as an instructor of anthropology at Harvard University in Cambridge, Massachusetts in 1964 and a lecturer of anthropology at the University of Pennsylvania in Philadelphia from 1966 to 1971. She also was a visiting associate professor at the University of Texas, Austin in 1974. Linares worked as a fellow at the Center for Advanced Study at Stanford University in California, from 1979 to 1980 and as a visiting professor in 1982. Later she was a fellow at St. John's overseas at Cambridge University in England from 1986 to 1987. In 2002 she was a trustee for the International Plant Genetic Resources Institute in Rome in 2002.

Linares retired in 2008, as senior research scientist at STRI, after an association at the institute lasting some 35 years. She retained status as scientist emerita with the STRI scientific faculty.

== Principal archaeological research projects ==
=== Southern Central America ===
Linares began her career as an archaeologist mainly focused on studying lower Central America, in particular Panama. In part, her research was an effort to bring to light the validity or invalidity of popular assumptions that this region served solely as a corridor between Mesoamerica and South America. She deduced that historically, there were populations that lived, hunted and farmed in these regions, and that it was not merely a pathway connecting Central America to South America.

One of Linares' earliest ventures was exploring occupation sequences in the Gulf of Chiriqui in central Panama from AD 300 to the 'Classic' Chiriquí Province culture. This was the first effort to establish a chronology of the Chiriqui based on stratified refuge deposits. She did this by studying changing ceramic techniques of four excavation sites in the region which presented a sequence of occupation which she then related to other central Panamanian provinces and in Costa Rica.

Linares later studied 'adaptive radiation' in prehistoric populations in Western Panama. To do this, she looked at the archaeological evidence of two differing environments present at the same time, one humid while the other was more seasonal, to explain the divergence of a people with a single origin. Related to the different environments was the emergence of different agricultural practices: vegeculture versus seed culture. By looking at what may have happened when an ancient population migrated and colonized a new territory, Linares is essentially developing theories of patterns of the peopling of the Americas.

Linares also examined "Ecology and the arts in ancient Panama." During this research she studied the culture and art of ancient populations of the central provinces of Panama. Much of her research was done at Sitio Conte where she collected artifacts in order to better understand the 'meaning and function' of the arts. This included a study of trade practices and social structures of power during the 16th century of the Cocle and Guna cultures.

=== Senegal ===
From the 1980s until present, Linares began extensive research in the Casamance region of Southern Senegal, the region located below the Gambia. More specifically, this research focused on social organizations and food production of the Jola people (also spelled Diola.) She looks at the varying techniques of wet rice production and compares them with different modes of cultivation in the region. She also examines how social organization shapes these differing methods.

One example of this is the role gender plays in the production of cash crops versus subsistence crops. Here, she looks at the effects of colonial influence on the practices of the Jola, and how traditional cultivation differs from modern cultivation of crops purely for export.

In addition to rural food cultivation practices, Linares explores a new form that she refers to as "urban farming" that has developed in the age of post-colonialism. With much migration to larger cities, traditional practices of subsistence growing have led to backyard farming in urban areas, providing not only another source of food, but also a way to maintain and strengthen friendship, "inter-ethnic" cooperation, as well as to enrich the environment.

Furthermore, she discusses the role the government has played in agricultural failures due to drought in the Basse Casamance region. According to Linares, drought and other uncontrollable factors are not the sole reason for subpar agricultural performance, but also the state's inability to respond effectively and appropriately to these environmental stresses.

== Awards and memberships ==
Grantee National Science Foundation, 1965, 1970—73

Fellow: American Association for the Advancement of Science; mem.: National Academy of Sciences, Royal Anthropology Institute, Am. Anthropology Association (member ethics committee 1992–93).

== Publications ==
- Linares, Olga F. et al. 1975. "Prehistoric agriculture in tropical highlands." Science, Vol. 187(n.s.):4172, pp. 137–45.
- Linares, Olga F. 1976. "Garden hunting" in the American tropics. Human Ecology. vol. 4, no. 4, pp. 331–349.
- Linares, Olga F. 1977. Ecology and the arts in ancient Panama : on the development of social rank and symbolism in the central provinces. Studies in Pre-Columbian Art and Archaeology, No. 17. Washington D.C., Dumbarton Oaks.
- Linares, Olga F. 1979. What is lower Central American archaeology? Annual review of anthropology, Vol 8, pp. 21–43.
- Linares, O.F. 1998. Kuseek and Kuriimen: Wives and Kinswomen in Jola Society. Canadian Journal of African Studies 22(3): 472–490.
- Linares, O.F. 1992. POWER, PRAYER AND PRODUCTION: the Jola of Casamance, Senegal. Cambridge, U.K.: Cambridge University Press.
- Hladik, C.M., Hladik, A., Linares, O. F., Pagezy, H., Semple, A. and Hadley, M. (eds.) 1993. TROPICAL FORESTS, PEOPLE AND FOOD: BIOCULTURAL INTERACTIONS AND APPLICATIONS TO DEVELOPMENT. Man in the Biosphere (MAB) Series, Vol. 13: UNESCO.
- Linares, O.F. 1993. Time, meaning and the restructuring of social relations: old and new crops among the Jola of Senegal. In: Configurations of Power in Complex Society: Holistic Anthropology in Theory and Practice. J. Henderson and P. Netherly, eds., Ch.7: pp. 160–180. Ithaca: Cornell University Press.
- Linares, O.F. 1996. Cultivating Biological and Cultural Diversity: Urban Farming in Casamance, Senegal. Africa: Journal of the International African Institute, Vol. 66 (1), 104–121.
- Linares, O.F. 1997. Diminished rains and divided tasks: rice growing in three Jola communities of Casamance, Senegal. In: The Ecology of Practice: Food Crop Production in SubSaharan West Africa, Nyer
- Linares, O.F. 1997. Agrarian Systems. In: Middleton, John (ed.). Encyclopedia of Africa South of the Sahara, Vol. I, pp. 17–22. New York: Simon & Schuster MacMillan.
- Linares, O.F. 1998. Rice production and the drought: Jola communities in Lower Casamance, Senegal. For: Chéneau-Loquay, A. and A. Leplaideur, eds. Quel Avenir pour les Rizicultures_ I'Afrique de l'Ouest. Bordeaux, France: CEGET.
- Linares, O.F. 2000. Creating cultural diversity: tropical forests transformed.In: Nature and Human Society: The Quest for a Sustainable Future. P.H. Raven (ed.) Proceedings of 1997 Forum on Biodiversity Washington D.C.: National Academy Press, March 2000, pp 420–434.
