= List of Ponana species =

These species belong to Ponana, a genus of leafhoppers in the family Cicadellidae.

== Ponana species ==
- Ponana aenea
- Ponana albosignata
- Ponana amana DeLong, Wolda & Estribi, 1983
- Ponana ampa DeLong, 1977
- Ponana anela DeLong & Freytag, 1967
- Ponana anepa DeLong & Freytag, 1967
- Ponana aquila
- Ponana areya DeLong, 1981
- Ponana atea DeLong & Freytag, 1967
- Ponana aurata DeLong & Freytag, 1967
- Ponana avena DeLong & Freytag, 1967
- Ponana balloui DeLong, 1981
- Ponana bera DeLong & Freytag, 1967
- Ponana berta DeLong & Freytag, 1967
- Ponana bisignata Fowler, 1903
- Ponana bola DeLong & Freytag, 1967
- Ponana boquetea DeLong, Wolda & Estribi, 1983
- Ponana cacozela
- Ponana candida
- Ponana cephalata DeLong, 1977
- Ponana cerella DeLong & Freytag, 1967
- Ponana cerosa DeLong & Freytag, 1967
- Ponana cesta DeLong & Freytag, 1967
- Ponana chiapa DeLong & Freytag, 1967
- Ponana cincta DeLong & Freytag, 1967
- Ponana citrina (Spangberg, 1878)
- Ponana clavella DeLong, Wolda & Estribi, 1983
- Ponana cleta DeLong & Freytag, 1967
- Ponana conspersa Spångberg, 1878
- Ponana curiata Gibson, 1919
- Ponana dana DeLong & Freytag, 1967
- Ponana demela DeLong & Freytag, 1967
- Ponana distortia DeLong & Freytag, 1967
- Ponana divergens DeLong & Freytag, 1967
- Ponana divisa DeLong & Cwikla, 1988
- Ponana dohrni
- Ponana dulera DeLong & Freytag, 1967
- Ponana extensa DeLong, 1942
- Ponana fastosa Metcalf & Bruner, 1949
- Ponana floridana
- Ponana fortina DeLong & Freytag, 1967
- Ponana fuscara DeLong & Martinson, 1980
- Ponana guatama DeLong & Freytag, 1967
- Ponana hieroglyphica Fowler, 1903
- Ponana hilara DeLong & Martinson, 1973
- Ponana inflata DeLong, 1942
- Ponana integra DeLong, 1942
- Ponana irheae DeLong, Wolda & Estribi, 1983
- Ponana limbatipennis
- Ponana limonea
- Ponana magna Caldwell, 1952
- Ponana meadi DeLong & Martinson, 1980
- Ponana mexella DeLong & Freytag, 1967
- Ponana modesta Spångberg, 1883
- Ponana notula Fowler, 1903
- Ponana occlusa
- Ponana ornatata DeLong & Kolbe, 1974
- Ponana ornatella DeLong, 1981
- Ponana ortha DeLong, Wolda & Estribi, 1983
- Ponana pamana DeLong & Freytag, 1967
- Ponana pana DeLong & Freytag, 1967
- Ponana panera DeLong & Martinson, 1973
- Ponana pauperata
- Ponana pectoralis (Spangberg, 1878)
- Ponana pertenua DeLong, 1977
- Ponana perusana DeLong, 1980
- Ponana propior
- Ponana puertoricensis Caldwell, 1952
- Ponana punctatella
- Ponana puncticollis (Spangberg, 1878)
- Ponana punctipennis
- Ponana pura DeLong, 1942
- Ponana quadralaba DeLong, 1942
- Ponana quadriproba DeLong, Wolda & Estribi, 1983
- Ponana reservanda Fowler, 1903
- Ponana rubida DeLong, 1942
- Ponana rubrapuncta
- Ponana sandersi DeLong, 1977
- Ponana scarlatina (Fitch, 1851)
- Ponana sena DeLong & Martinson, 1973
- Ponana seresa DeLong & Martinson, 1973
- Ponana serrella DeLong & Martinson, 1973
- Ponana serrens DeLong, 1977
- Ponana sonora Ball
- Ponana sparsa
- Ponana tabula DeLong & Martinson, 1973
- Ponana tama DeLong & Freytag, 1967
- Ponana tamala DeLong & Freytag, 1967
- Ponana tena DeLong & Freytag, 1967
- Ponana tresa DeLong & Freytag, 1967
- Ponana tura DeLong & Freytag, 1967
- Ponana valeda DeLong & Freytag, 1967
- Ponana vandera DeLong & Freytag, 1967
- Ponana vebera DeLong & Freytag, 1967
- Ponana vedala DeLong & Freytag, 1967
- Ponana velora DeLong & Freytag, 1967
- Ponana vinula Stål, 1864
- Ponana virga DeLong, Wolda & Estribi, 1983
- Ponana volara DeLong & Freytag, 1967
- Ponana vulana DeLong & Freytag, 1967
- Ponana woodruffi DeLong & Martinson, 1980
- Ponana xarela DeLong & Freytag, 1967
- Ponana xella DeLong & Freytag, 1967
- Ponana xena DeLong & Freytag, 1967
- Ponana xila DeLong & Freytag, 1967
- Ponana xola DeLong & Freytag, 1967
- Ponana yena DeLong & Freytag, 1967
- Ponana yera DeLong & Freytag, 1967
- Ponana yura DeLong & Freytag, 1967
