= Martin Moynihan =

Martin Moynihan may refer to:

- Martin Moynihan (biologist)
- Martin Moynihan (judge)
