= Astrothelium cryptolucens =

Scientific classification
- Kingdom: Fungi
- Division: Ascomycota
- Class: Dothideomycetes
- Order: Trypetheliales
- Family: Trypetheliaceae
- Genus: Astrothelium
- Species: A. cryptolucens

Binomial name
- Astrothelium cryptolucens Lücking, M.P.Nelsen & N.Salazar (2016)

Species of lichen

Astrothelium cryptolucens is a species of corticolous (bark-dwelling), crustose lichen in the family Trypetheliaceae. Found in Panama, it was formally described as a new species in 2016 by Robert Lücking, Matthew Nelsen, and Noris Salazar Allen. The type specimen was collected by the first author from the Altos de Campana National Park (near Capira) at an altitude of 500–600 m (1,600–2,000 ft); there, in a submontane rainforest, it was found growing on the bark of roadside trees. The lichen has an uneven to coarsely bumpy, olive-yellow thallus that covers areas of up to 10 cm (4 in) in diameter. The species epithet cryptolucens makes reference both to the habit of the immersed perithecia and the presence of lichexanthone. The characteristics of the lichen that distinguish it from others in genus Astrothelium are the finely and densely cracked pseudostromata that dominate the thallus, with dispersed thallus bumps; and the hardly visible ascomata that are completely immersed in pseudostromata. A. cryptolucens is somewhat similar to Astrothelium carrascoense, but that species does not have an inspersed hamathecium.
