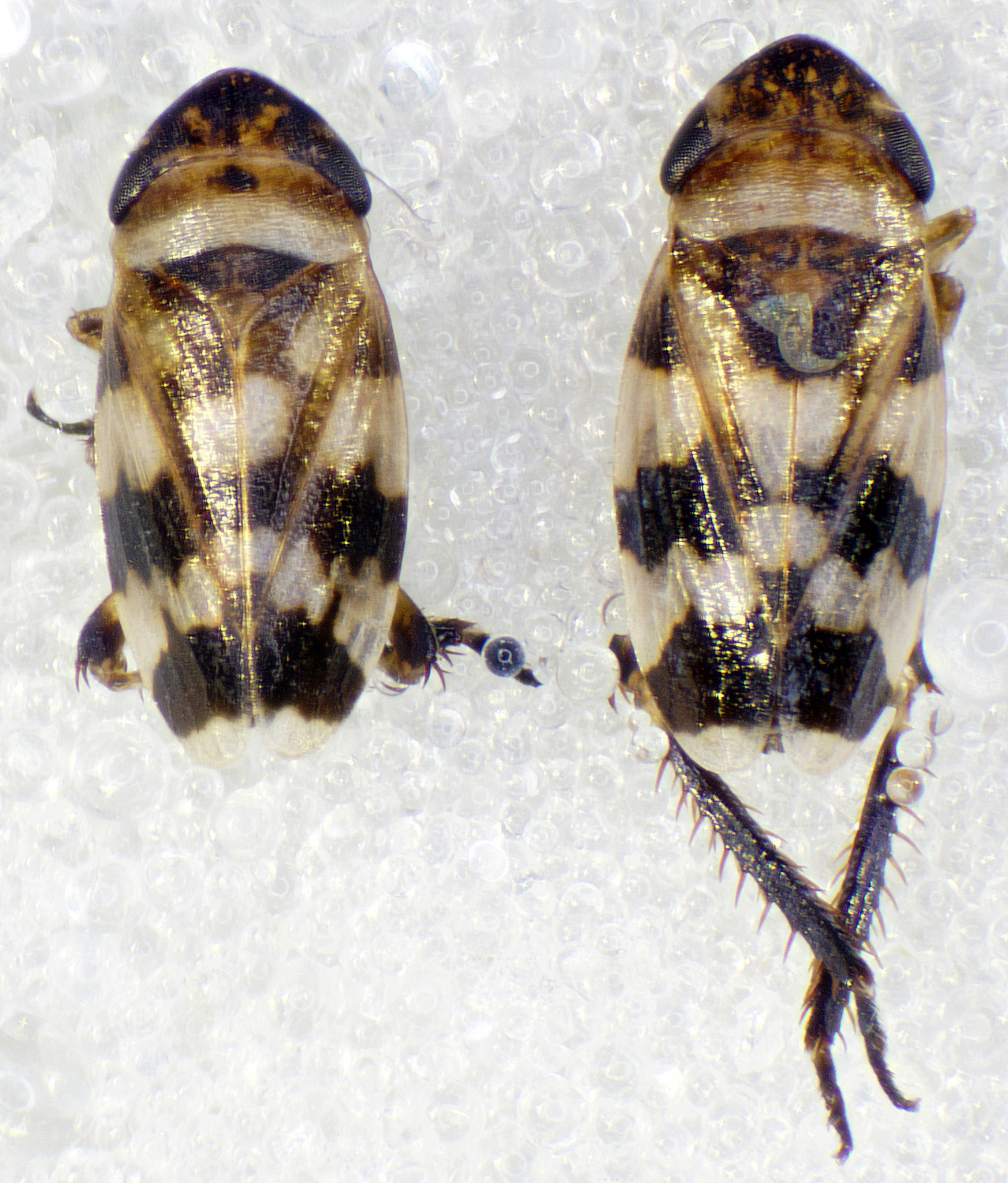
- Male
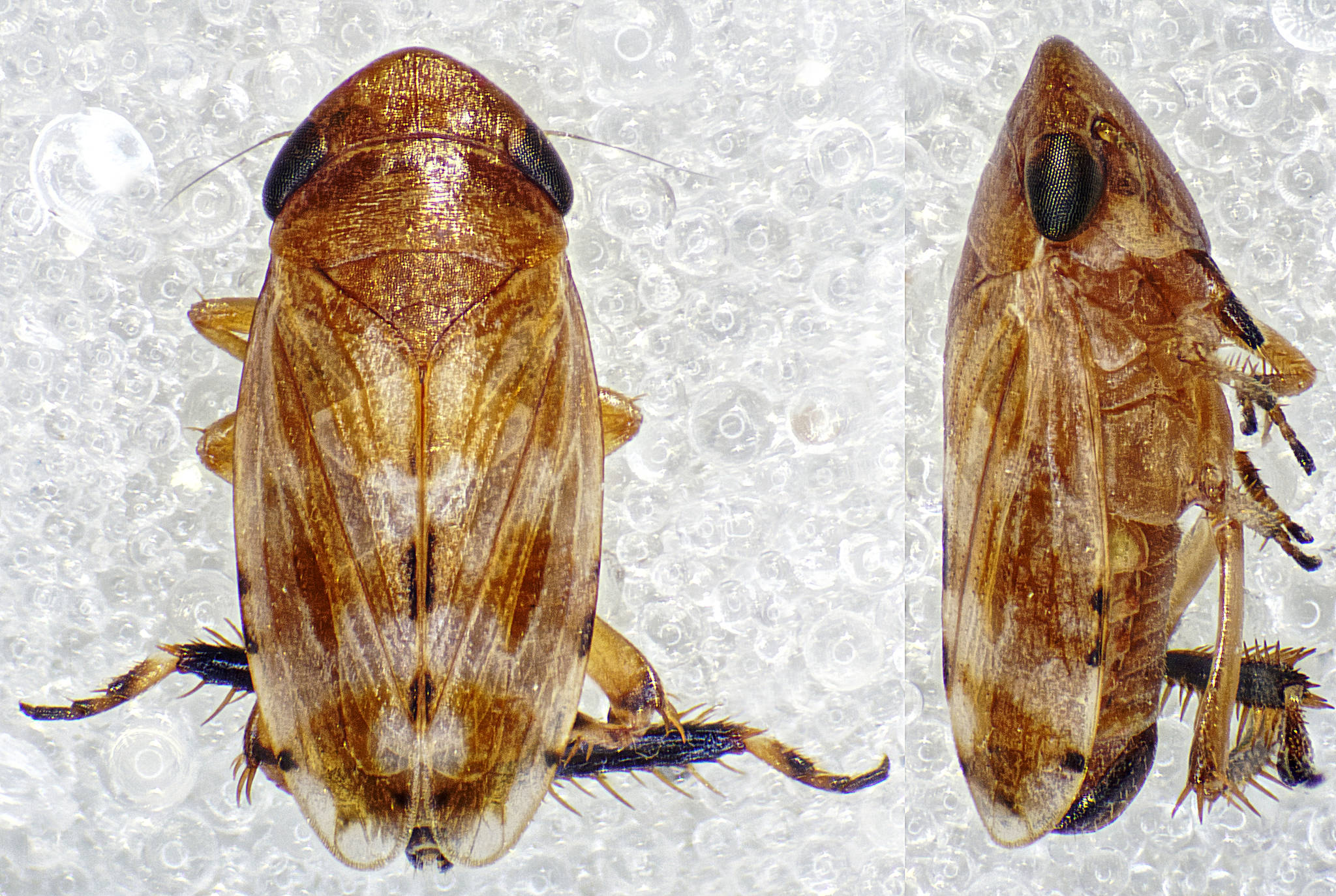
- Female

Scientific classification
- Kingdom: Animalia
- Phylum: Arthropoda
- Clade: Pancrustacea
- Class: Insecta
- Order: Hemiptera
- Suborder: Auchenorrhyncha
- Family: Cicadellidae
- Genus: Anoscopus
- Species: A. albifrons

Binomial name
- Anoscopus albifrons (Linnaeus, 1758)

Synonyms
- Cicada albifrons (Linnaeus, 1758); Acocephalus albifrons (Linnaeus, 1758); Aphrodes albifrons (Linnaeus, 1758)

= Anoscopus albifrons =

Species of insect

Anoscopus albifrons is a species of insect in the family Cicadellidae. It was first described by Carl Linnaeus in 1758, in the 10th Edition of his Systema Naturae. It is found throughout Europe, the Azores, and parts of the United States and Canada. It inhabits grassy areas and forbs.

== Taxonomy ==
Anoscopus albifrons has two currently recognised subspecies. However, the species shows very little divergence from A. limicola and A. duffieldi, and is likely conspecific with them. It forms an interbreeding population with limicola, and duffieldi may be considered a specially adapted subspecies of it.

- A. a. albifrons (Linnaeus, 1758)
- A. a. mappus Guglielmino and Bückle, 2015

== Description ==
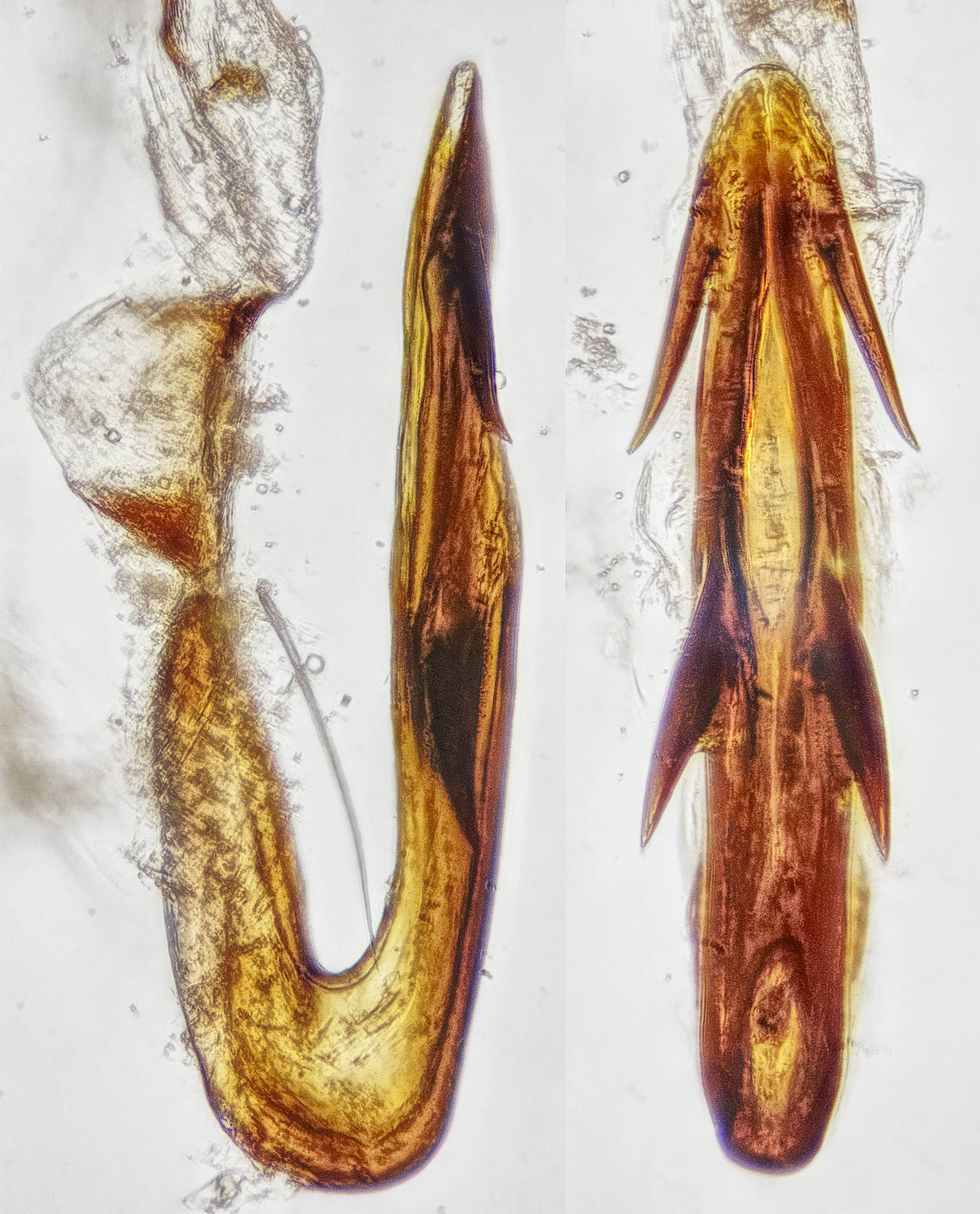
Anoscopus albifrons aedeagus

Male Anoscopus albifrons are 3–4 mm (0.12–0.16 in) long, while females are 4–5 mm (0.16–0.20 in) long. Like other Anoscopus species, A. albifrons has a rounded vertex and distinctive patterning. However, both males and females are still difficult to identify, although males can sometimes be identified from photos.

Males of the species have variable pale transverse bands, and can only be distinguished from A. limicola, A. albiger, and A. duffieldi by examining their aedeagus. The females are brownish and variably mottled, and are indistinguishable from females of A. duffieldi.

== Distribution and habitat ==
The species is native to Europe, being found in Portugal, France, Italy, Germany, Belgium, the Netherlands, Luxembourg, Austria, Denmark, Sweden, Norway, Finland, Latvia, Estonia, Great Britain, and the Isle of Man. Additionally, it has been introduced to the Azores. It has also been introduced to North America, where it is found in the Great Lakes region and the Pacific Northwest.
