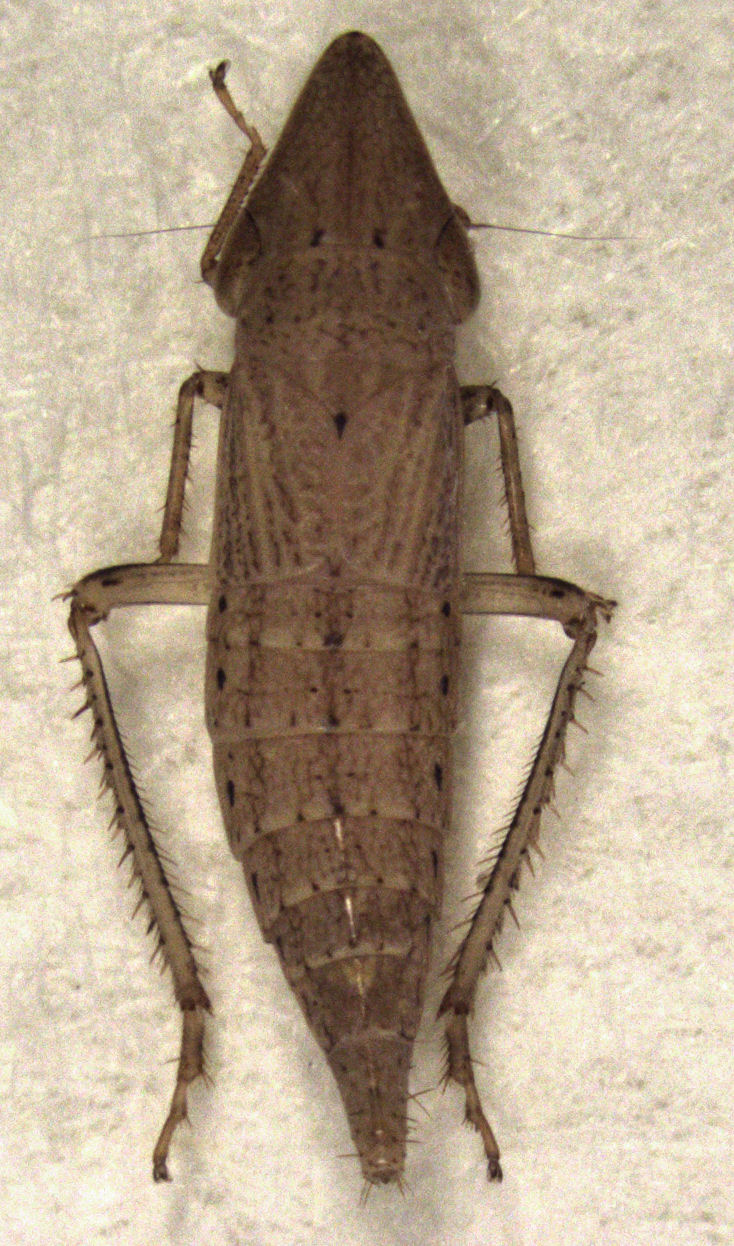
- Euacanthella palustris (adult brachypterous female, length about 7.8 mm)

Scientific classification
- Kingdom: Animalia
- Phylum: Arthropoda
- Class: Insecta
- Order: Hemiptera
- Suborder: Auchenorrhyncha
- Family: Cicadellidae
- Subfamily: Errhomeninae
- Tribe: Euacanthellini; Evans, 1966
- Genus: Euacanthella; Evans, 1974

= Euacanthella =

Euacanthellini

Subfamily of leafhoppers

Euacanthella is a genus of leafhoppers, native to Australia and adventive in New Zealand; it is now placed in the subfamily Errhomeninae and the monogeneric tribe Euacanthellini Evans, 1966.

== Taxonomy ==
The obsolete subfamily Euacanthellinae contained two tribes, Euacanthellini (always containing just Euacanthella), and Sagmatini (now placed in the Aphrodinae). A monotypic genus Paulianiana endemic to Madagascar is now placed incertae sedis in the Ledrinae.

== Species ==
New Zealand has a single species, Euacanthella palustris, adventive from Australia. The World Auchenorrhyncha Database includes:

1. Euacanthella bicolor Evans, 1938
2. Euacanthella impressa Fletcher, 2008
3. Euacanthella palustris Evans, 1938
