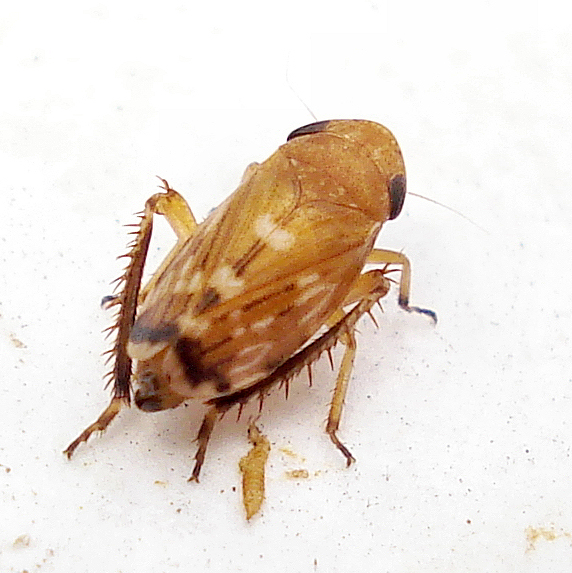
- Anoscopus

Scientific classification
- Kingdom: Animalia
- Phylum: Arthropoda
- Clade: Pancrustacea
- Class: Insecta
- Order: Hemiptera
- Suborder: Auchenorrhyncha
- Family: Cicadellidae
- Tribe: Aphrodini
- Genus: Anoscopus; Kirschbaum, 1858

Synonyms
- Anoscopsis Kirschbaum, 1858; Ribautiella Zachvatkin, 1933; Ribautiellus Zachvatkin, 1933

= Anoscopus =

Genus of leafhoppers

Anoscopus is a genus of leafhoppers (family Cicadellidae). The genus was first described by Carl Ludwig Kirschbaum in 1858. The species of this genus are found in Europe and North America.

== Species ==
The species in this genus are:

- Anoscopus albifrons
- Anoscopus albiger
- Anoscopus assimilis
- Anoscopus carlebippus
- Anoscopus crassus
- Anoscopus duffieldi
- Anoscopus flavostriatus
- Anoscopus gorloppus
- Anoscopus histrionicus
- Anoscopus limicola
- Anoscopus petrophilus
- Anoscopus samuricus
- Anoscopus serratulae
- Anoscopus siracusae
- Anoscopus striatus
