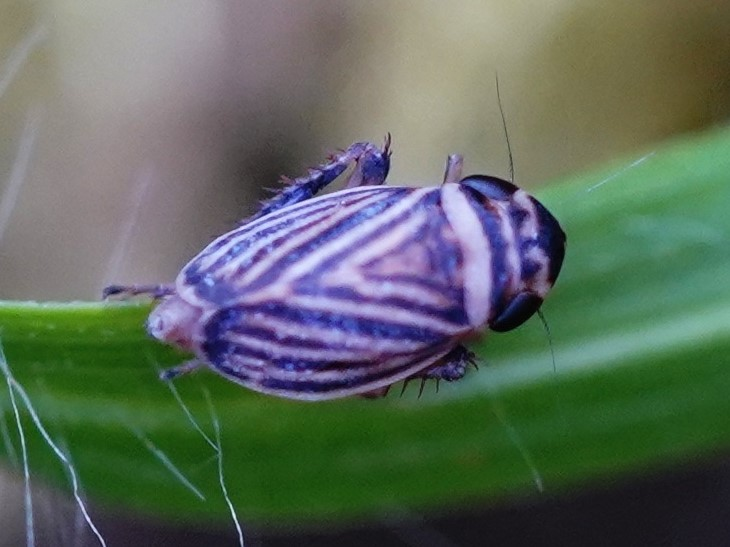

Scientific classification
- Domain: Eukaryota
- Kingdom: Animalia
- Phylum: Arthropoda
- Class: Insecta
- Order: Hemiptera
- Suborder: Auchenorrhyncha
- Family: Cicadellidae
- Genus: Anoscopus
- Species: A. flavostriatus

Binomial name
- Anoscopus flavostriatus (Donovan, 1799)

= Anoscopus flavostriatus =

Species of true bug

Anoscopus flavostriatus is a species of leafhopper belonging to the family Cicadellidae. It is native to Europe.
