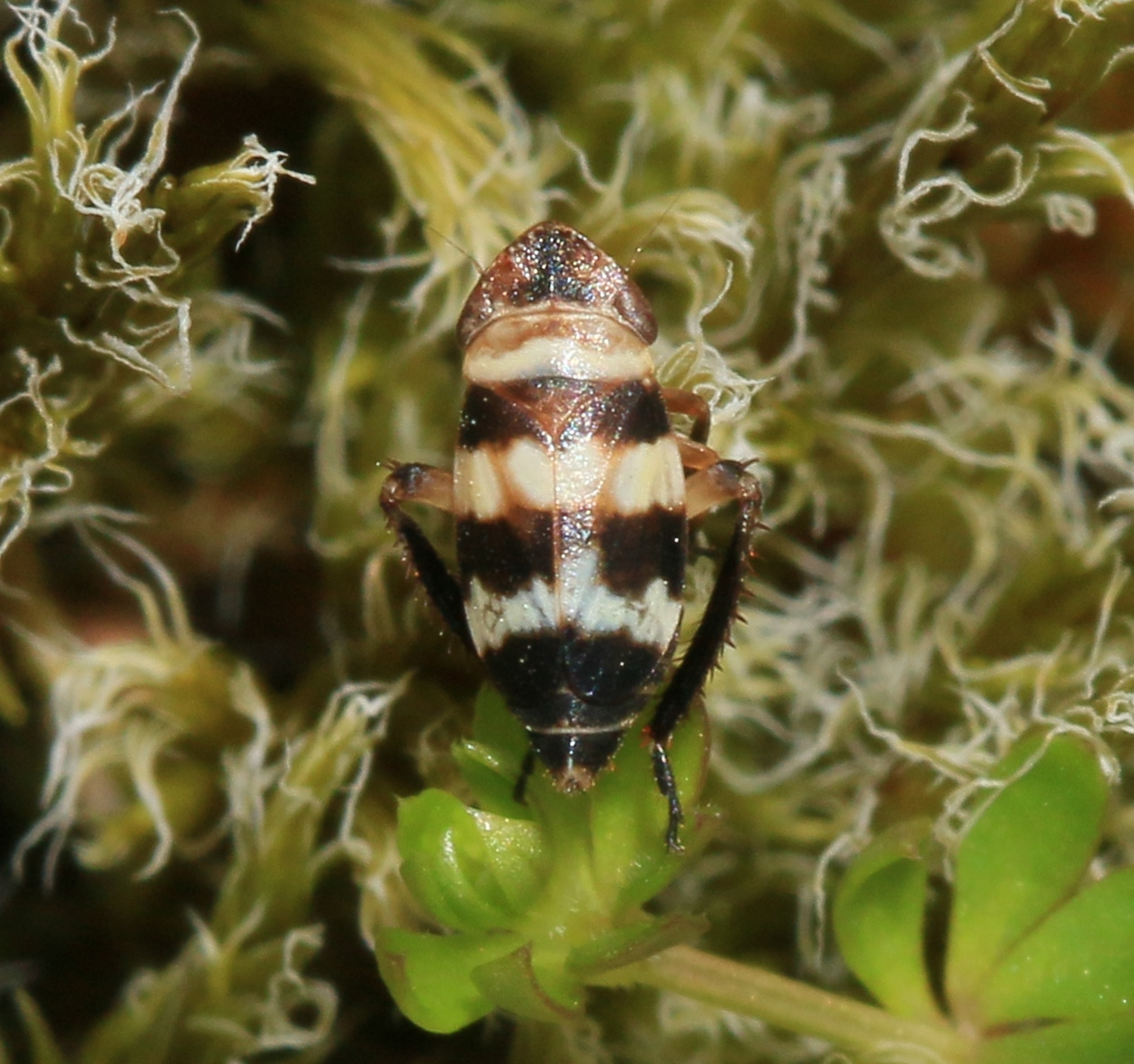

Scientific classification
- Kingdom: Animalia
- Phylum: Arthropoda
- Clade: Pancrustacea
- Class: Insecta
- Order: Hemiptera
- Suborder: Auchenorrhyncha
- Family: Cicadellidae
- Tribe: Aphrodini
- Genus: Planaphrodes; Hamilton, 1975

= Planaphrodes =

Genus of leafhoppers

Planaphrodes is a genus of leafhoppers in the family Cicadellidae. The described species in Planaphrodes are found mostly in the Palaearctic realm and eastern Asia.

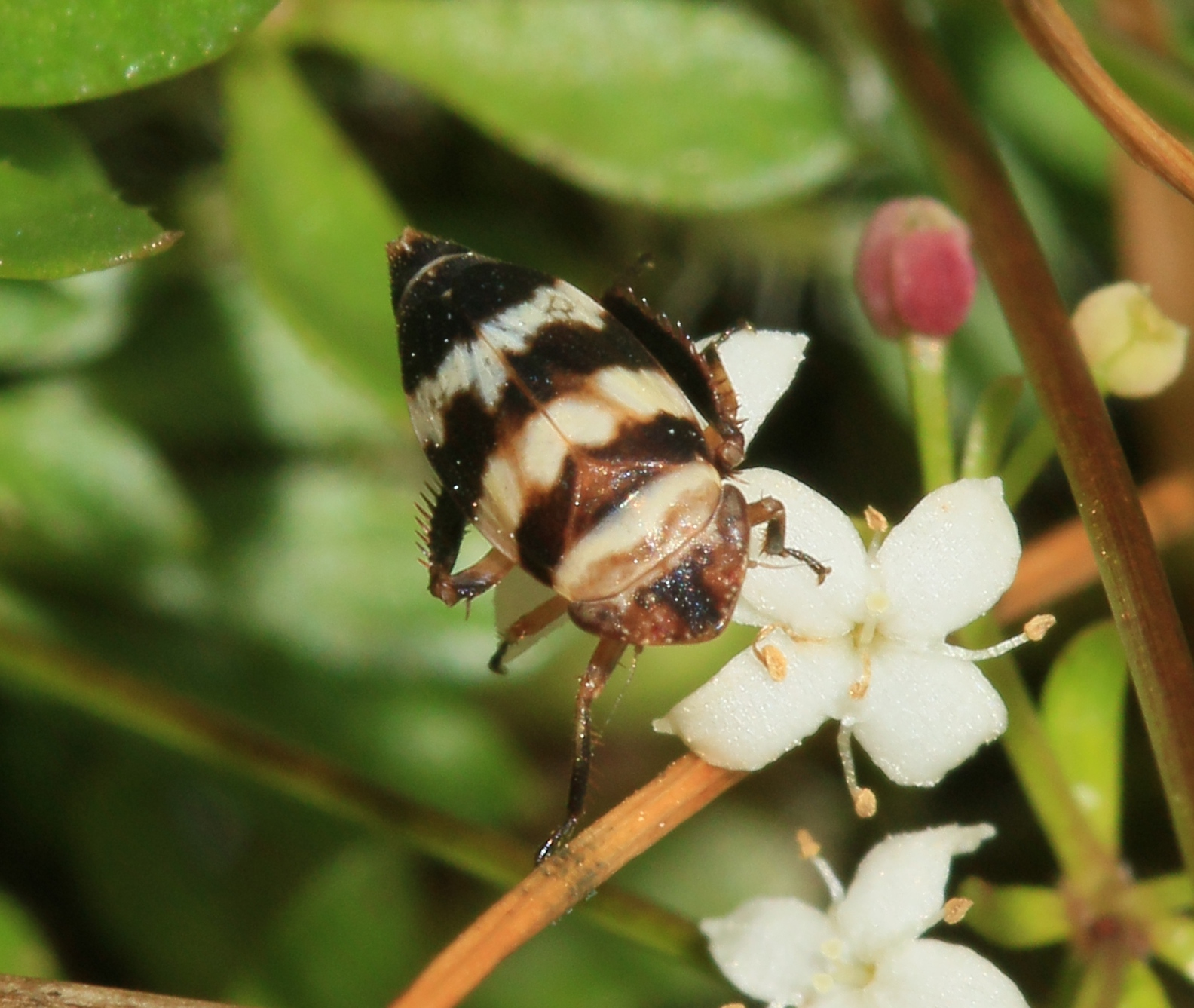

== Species ==
The following species are recognised in the genus Planaphrodes:

- Planaphrodes angulaticeps (Emeljanov, 1964)
- Planaphrodes araxica (Logvinenko, 1971)
- Planaphrodes baoxingensis Liang & Dai, 2023
- Planaphrodes bifasciata (Linnaeus, 1758)
- Planaphrodes elongata (Lethierry, 1876)
- Planaphrodes faciems Liang & Dai, 2023
- Planaphrodes furcillata (Sáringer, 1959)
- Planaphrodes iranica (Dlabola, 1971)
- Planaphrodes laeva (Rey, 1891)
- Planaphrodes lusitanica (Rodrigues, 1968)
- Planaphrodes modica (Logvinenko, 1966)
- Planaphrodes monticola (Logvinenko, 1965)
- Planaphrodes nigricans (Matsumura, 1912)
- Planaphrodes nigrita (Kirschbaum, 1868)
- Planaphrodes nisamiana (Logvinenko, 1983)
- Planaphrodes sahlbergii (Signoret, 1879)
- Planaphrodes vallicola (Logvinenko, 1967)

See also Planaphrodes trifasciata, originally as Cicada trifasciata De Geer, 1773, but see also Cicada trifasciata Fourcroy, 1785 [or Geoffroy in Fourcroy, 1785]. These are later treated as distinct descriptions, therefore as objective homonyms. As distinct, the former is later treated as a junior synonym of Cicada bifasciata Linnaeus, 1758, the latter as Planaphrodes laeva (Rey, 1891).
