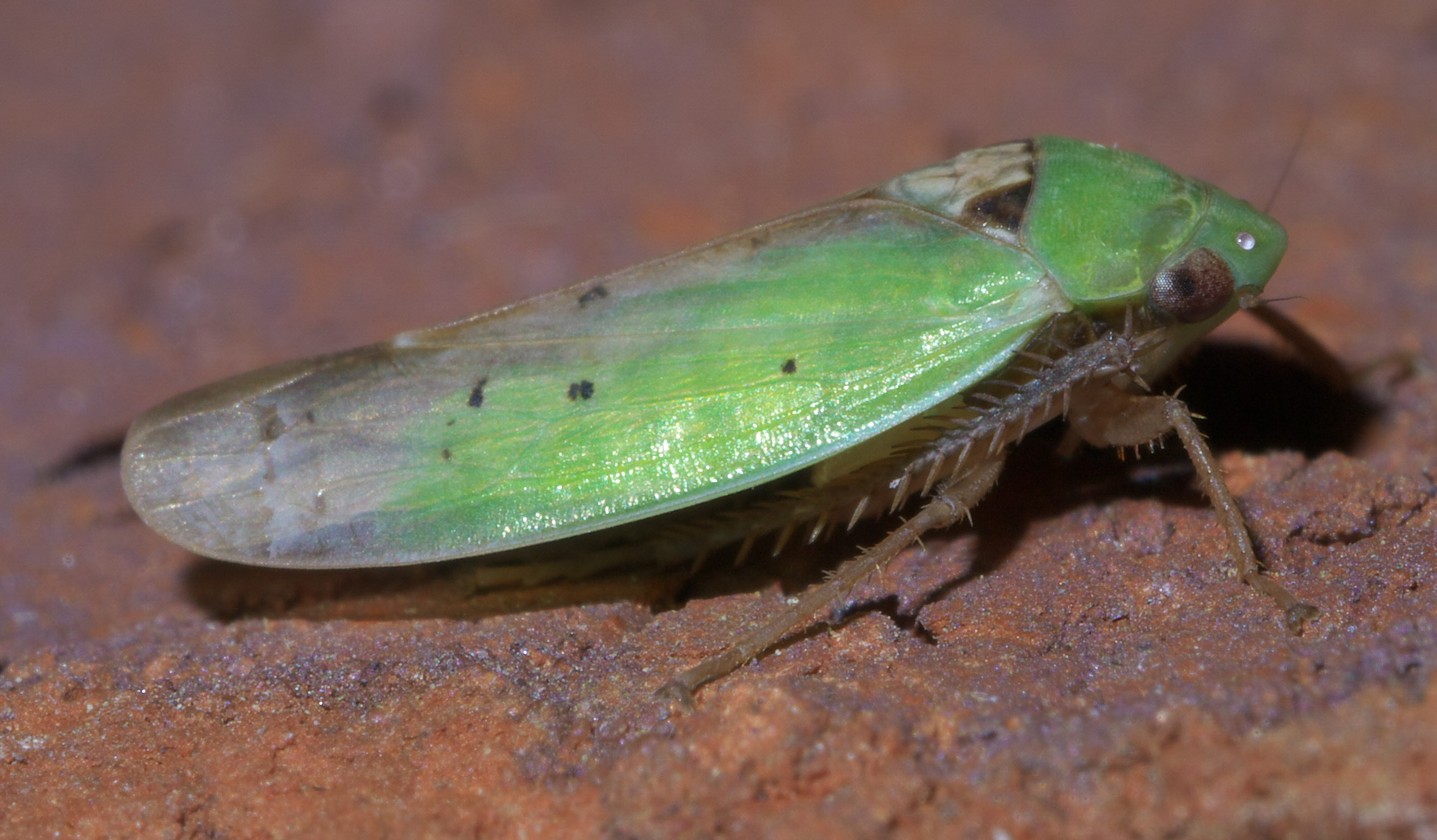
- Ponana pectoralis

Scientific classification
- Kingdom: Animalia
- Phylum: Arthropoda
- Clade: Pancrustacea
- Class: Insecta
- Order: Hemiptera
- Suborder: Auchenorrhyncha
- Family: Cicadellidae
- Subfamily: Iassinae
- Tribe: Gyponini
- Genus: Ponana; Ball, 1920

Subgenera
- Bulbana; Lataponana; Neoponana; Peranoa; Ponana; Proxaponana

Diversity
- at least 100 species

= Ponana =

Genus of leafhoppers

Ponana is a genus of leafhoppers in the family Cicadellidae. There are more than 100 described species in the genus Ponana.

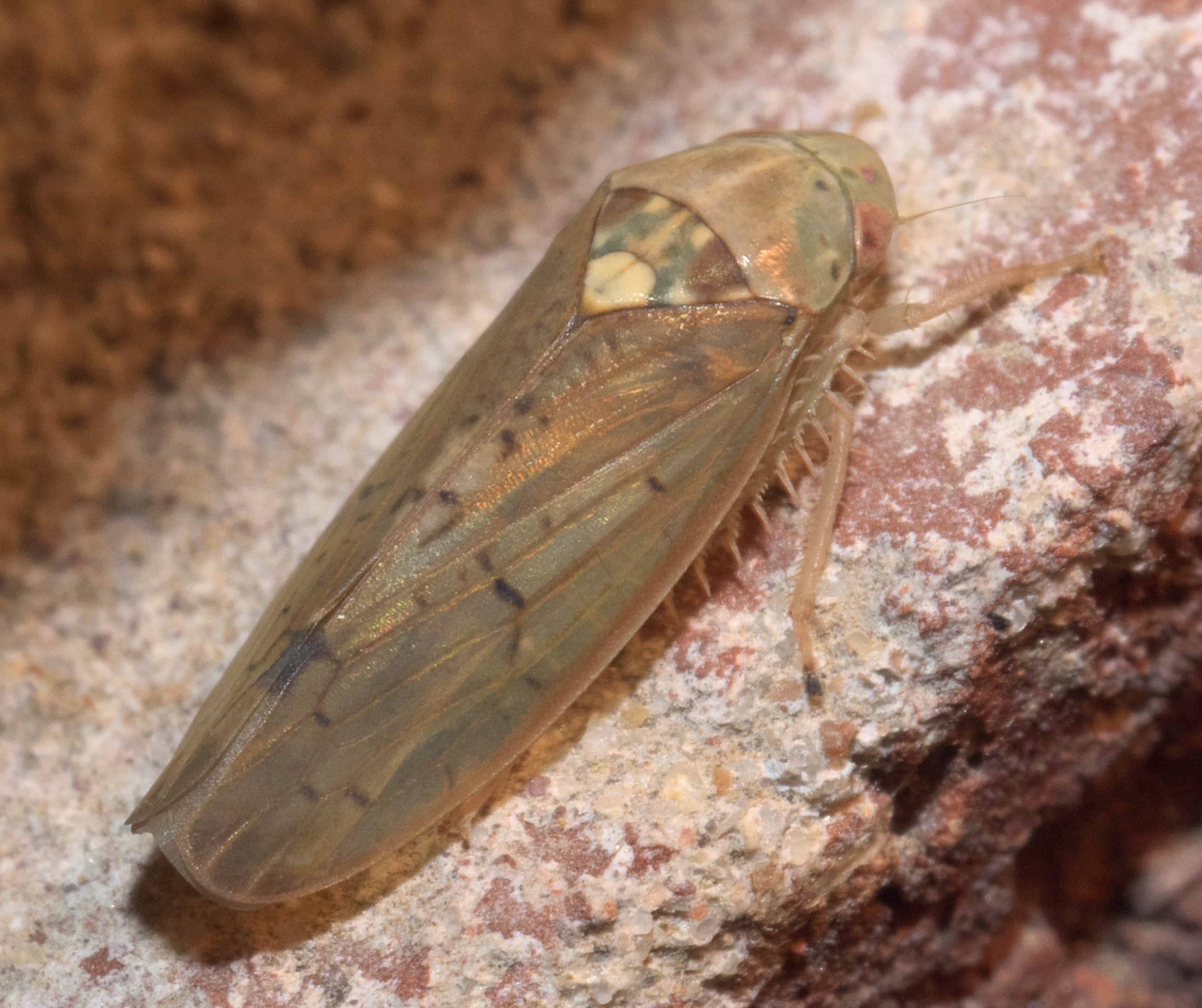
Ponana quadralaba

== See also ==
- List of Ponana species
