= James Zetek =

American entomologist (1886–1959)

- Born: December 12, 1886
- Died: June 2, 1959 (aged 72)
- Scientific career
- Fields: Entomology

James Zetek (December 12, 1886 – June 2, 1959) was an American entomologist and authority on the natural history of Panama.

== Career ==
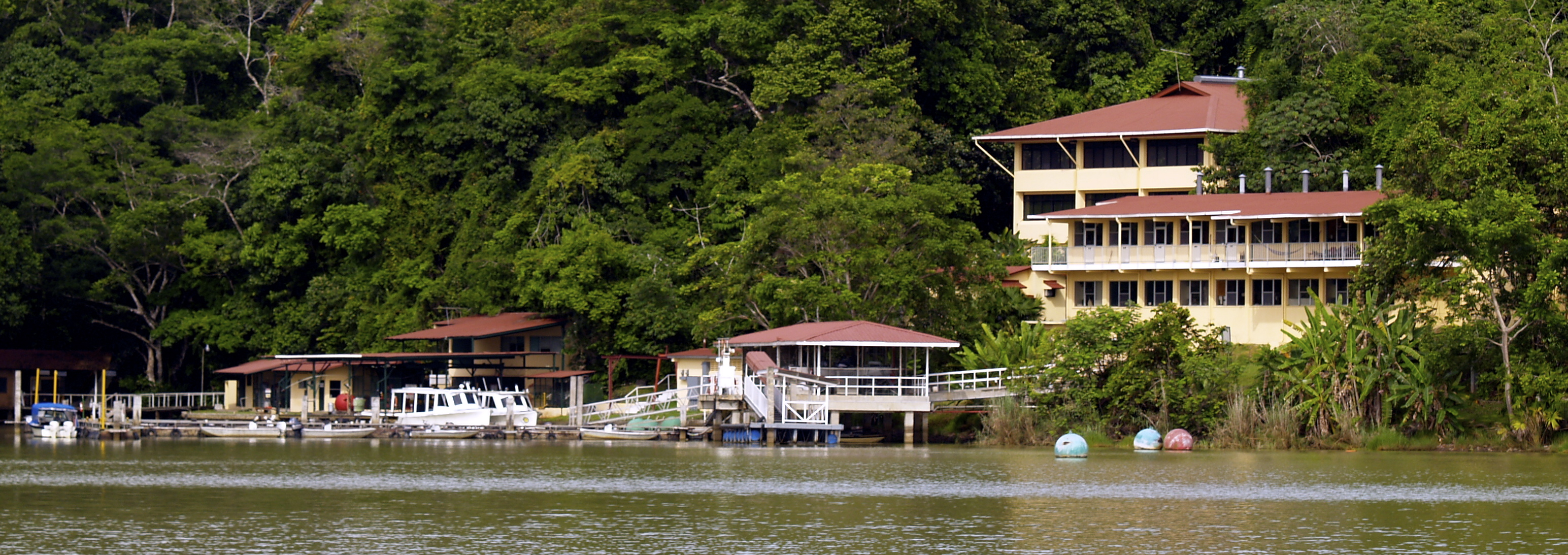
Barro Colorado Research Station, 2006

James Zetek was born as Vaclav Zetek on December 12, 1886, in Chicago, son of Vaclav Zetek, an immigrant from Bohemia and a stone cutter in Chicago, and his spouse Johanna Velker. James went to Panama in 1911 as an entomologist, serving for a time as professor there. Dr. Zetek was the Founding Director of the Canal Zone Biological Area (CZBA), located on Barro Colorado Island, Panama. He served as Resident Manager from 1923 to 1956. He died in Panama June 2, 1959, and was buried in Amador Cemetery.

Zetek's primary research interest was the study of termites and termite control. USDA entomologist Thomas E. Snyder studied with him.

Zetek also became an authority in other aspects of Panama's natural history. He wrote a paper on the mollusks of Panama in 1917.

In 1939, Zetek became a Fellow of the Entomological Society of America.

Zetek retired in 1956. His successor was Carl D. Koford. Zetek's papers are held by the Smithsonian Institution Archives.
