= Bocas del Toro Research Station =

Panamaian research station

Coordinates: 9.3517°N 82.2567°W

The Bocas del Toro Research Station (BRS) is a field station of the Smithsonian Tropical Research Institute (STRI) on Panama’s western Caribbean coast, is a platform for both marine and terrestrial biodiversity research. The station hosts a diverse group of scientists from more than 20 countries, every year.

Activities at the station contribute to the Smithsonian Institution’s primary mission: the increase and diffusion of knowledge. Visiting scientists are engaged in research on the biodiversity, ecology, paleontology and archaeology of the Bocas del Toro region. Educational and outreach activities range from hosting K-12 school groups, to specialized training for international graduate students.

Founded in 1998, the BRS campus has provided field accommodation since 2002 and a fully operational research laboratory since 2003. The facilities now include a running seawater system, a new dock, boat ramp, and additional support facilities, as well as two houses to accommodate visiting researchers. The BRS is the most prominent field station in the Caribbean. Visiting scientists hold lectures that are open to the public.

== Outreach, education, and training ==
Outreach and education at the Bocas del Toro Research Station spans a range of programs targeting K-12 students, university undergraduates, graduate students and young professionals. K-12 education includes visits to local schools, some of which are in remote mountainous locations, and student visits to the BRS. The station also offers a training workshop for local K-12 teachers every year, an organized beach clean-up for Earth day, and other activities for local residents.

They hold an annual Environmental Fair.

== Biodiversity database ==
The Bocas biodiversity database provides a list of plants and animals that are known to occur in the Bocas del Toro Archipelago, the Bahía Almirante, Laguna de Chiriquí, and the surrounding mainland. Users can search for a particular term or browse the database by group. Some photographs, videos, maps and audio recordings are available.

== Facts and statistics ==
- Location: Isla Colon, Bocas del Toro Province, Panama
- Campus Size: 6 Hectares
- Date of Purchase: 1998
- Staff: 12 permanent staff
- Director: Dr. Rachel Collin
- Capacity: 28 resident scientists and 15 off campus researchers
- Annual Visitors: 325 scientific visitors work at the BRS every year
- Publications: 200 peer-review publications have been generated from work at the BRS since 1998
- Undergraduate Education: 9 undergraduate institutions including Princeton, Harvard, and Duke Universities teach undergraduate field classes at the BRS
- Outreach: 3000 members of the public participate in the BRS outreach activities every year
- Earth Day: Over 2 tons of garbage are collected from local beaches during the BRS beach clean-up each year

== Sources ==
- Collin R. 2005. "Ecological monitoring and biodiversity surveys at the Smithsonian Tropical Researcj Institute's Bocas del Toro Research Station". Caribbean Journal of Science 41: 367-374.
