= Stroggylocephalus =

Scientific classification
- Domain: Eukaryota
- Kingdom: Animalia
- Phylum: Arthropoda
- Class: Insecta
- Order: Hemiptera
- Suborder: Auchenorrhyncha
- Family: Cicadellidae
- Subfamily: Aphrodinae
- Genus: Stroggylocephalus; Flor, 1861

Genus of leafhoppers

Stroggylocephalus is a genus of leafhoppers (family Cicadellidae).

== Species ==
- Stroggylocephalus agrestis (Fallén, 1806)
- Stroggylocephalus favosus Yang, 1996
- Stroggylocephalus indicus Rao, 1989
- Stroggylocephalus livens (Zetterstedt, 1840)
- Stroggylocephalus mixta (Say, 1825)
- Stroggylocephalus placidus (Provancher, 1889)
