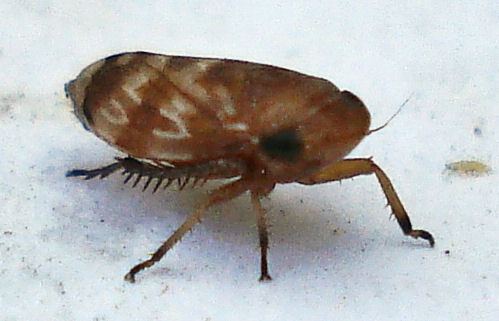
- Anoscopus albifrons

Scientific classification
- Kingdom: Animalia
- Phylum: Arthropoda
- Class: Insecta
- Order: Hemiptera
- Suborder: Auchenorrhyncha
- Family: Cicadellidae
- Subfamily: Aphrodinae; Haupt, 1927

= Aphrodinae =

Subfamily of leafhoppers

Aphrodinae is a subfamily of leafhoppers in the family Cicadellidae, containing three tribes.

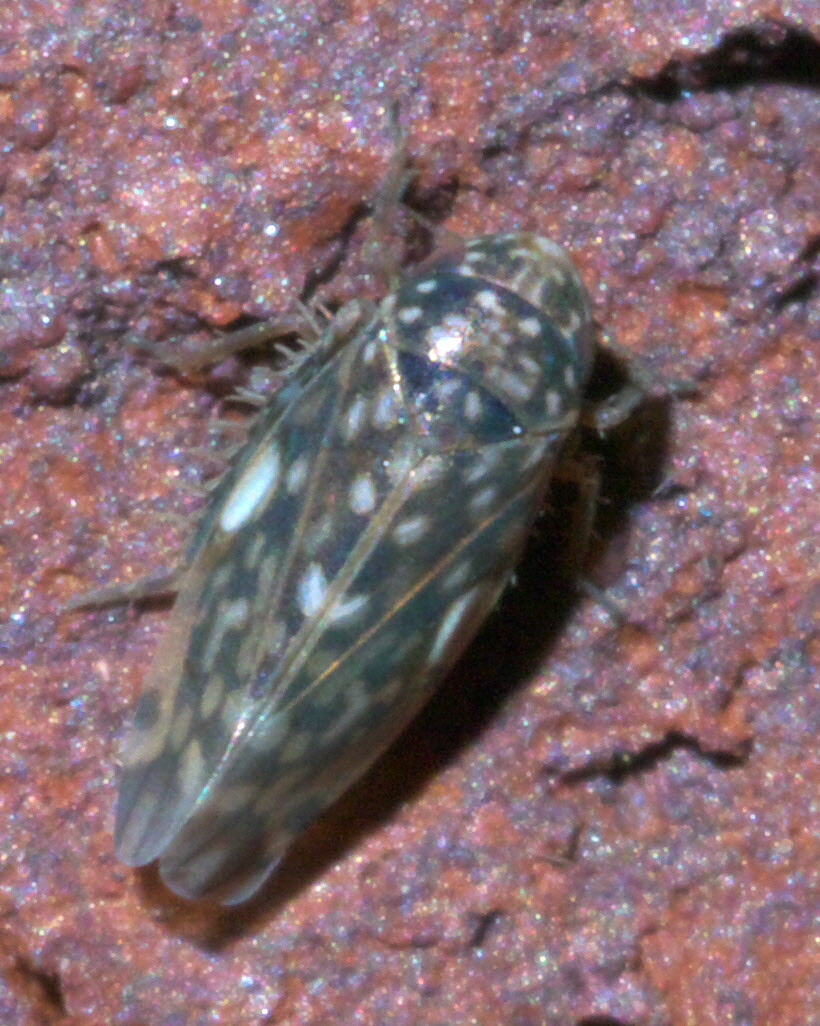
Xestocephalus lunatus

== Genera ==
The following genera belong to three tribes:

Aphrodini Haupt, 1927 [1859]

1. Anoscopus Kirschbaum, 1858^{c g b}
2. Aphrodes Curtis, 1833^{c g b}
3. Planaphrodes Hamilton, 1975^{c g b}
4. Stroggylocephalus Flor, 1861^{c g b}

Sagmatiini Hamilton, 1999

Previously placed in the obsolete subfamily Euacanthellinae this tribe contained genera native to Australia and New Caledonia has a single undescribed species of uncertain generic placement. A monotypic genus Paulianiana endemic to Madagascar is now placed incertae sedis in the Ledrinae.

1. Myerslopella Evans, 1977
2. Sagmation Hamilton, 1999

Xestocephalini Baker, 1915

1. Aloxestocephalus Evans, 1973
2. †Brevaphrodella Dietrich & Gonçalves, 2014
3. Matsumurana Distant, 1917
4. Myrmecophryne Kirkaldy, 1906
5. Ootacamundus Distant, 1918
6. †Xestocephalites Dietrich & Gonçalves, 2014
7. Xestocephalus Van Duzee, 1892

Incertae sedis

- †Rovnoxestus Dietrich, Dmitriev & Perkovsky, 2021
- †Acocephalus Scudder, 1878

Data sources: i = ITIS, c = Catalogue of Life, g = GBIF, b = Bugguide.net
