= Martin Moynihan (biologist) =

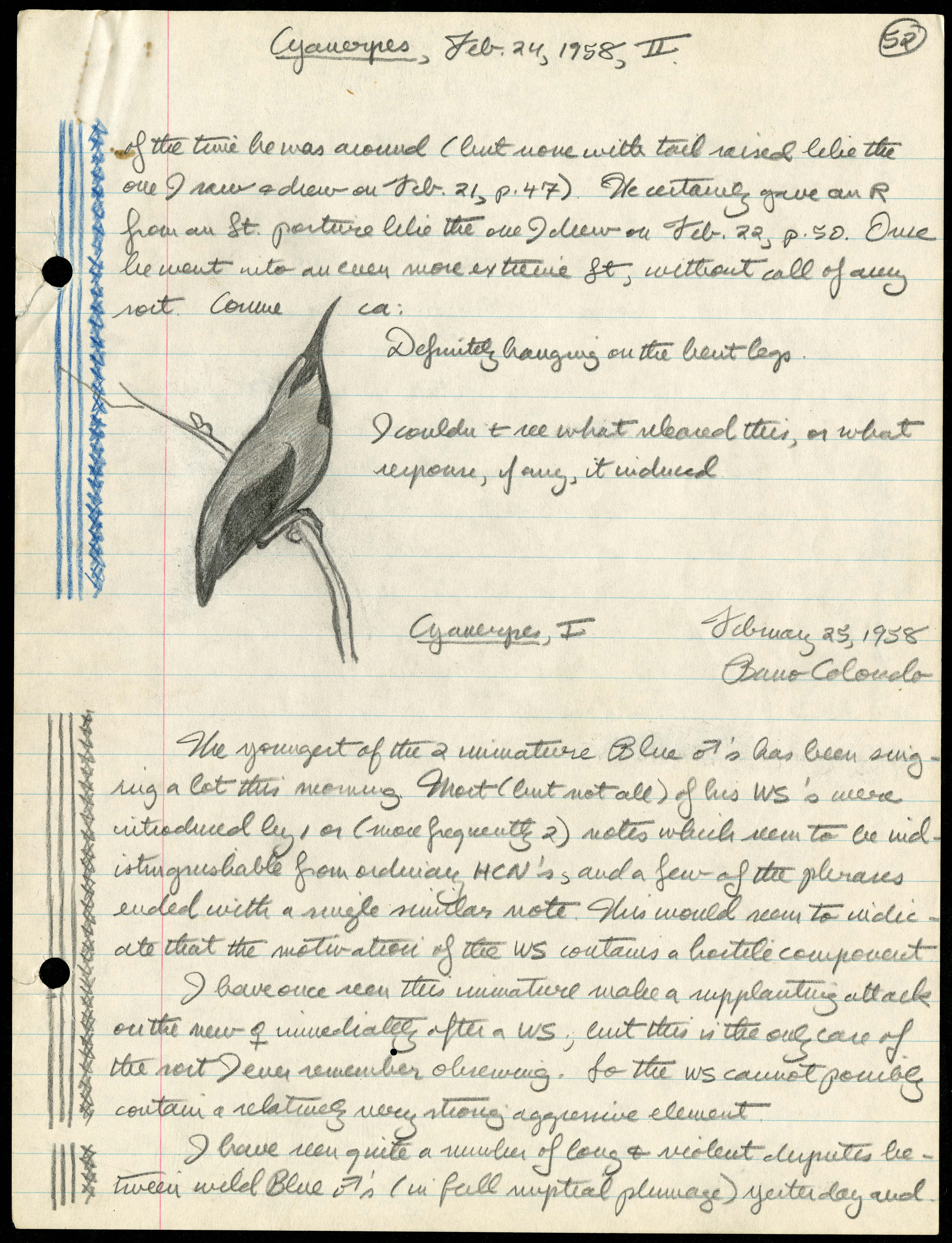
Moynihan's field notes and drawing of a Honeycreeper on Barro Colorado Island, 1958

Martin Humphrey Moynihan (5 February 1928 – 3 December 1996) was a behavioral evolutionary biologist and ornithologist who studied under Ernst Mayr and Niko Tinbergen, and was a contemporary of Desmond Morris. He was the founding director of the Smithsonian Tropical Research Institute (STRI) in Panama.

His early research was mainly on seagulls. Later work included the octopus, and Terence McKenna quotes Moynihan in his book Food of the Gods as saying, with respect to the octopus' ability to change its body's shape, texture and color, "Like the octopi, our destiny is to become what we think, to have our thoughts become our bodies and our bodies become our thoughts."

He was married to Olga F. Linares, a Panamanian-American anthropologist and STRI senior research scientist.

Moynihan died in Albi, France in 1996 of lung cancer, aged 68.
