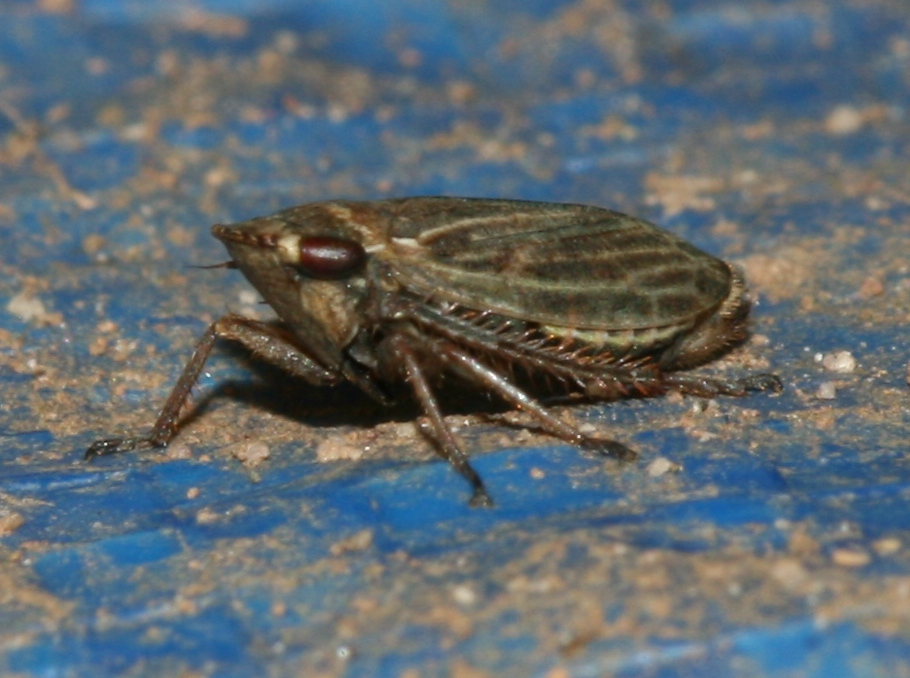
- Aphrodes makarovi

Scientific classification
- Kingdom: Animalia
- Phylum: Arthropoda
- Class: Insecta
- Order: Hemiptera
- Suborder: Auchenorrhyncha
- Family: Cicadellidae
- Subfamily: Aphrodinae
- Genus: Aphrodes; Curtis, 1833

Synonyms
- Acocephalus Burmeister, 1835; Acucephalus Germar, 1833; Pholetaera Zetterstedt, 1840

= Aphrodes =

Genus of leafhoppers

Aphrodes is the type genus of leafhoppers in the subfamily Aphrodinae and tribe Aphrodini. The species of this genus are found in Eurasia and North America.

== Species ==
The following species are recognised in the genus Aphrodes:

- Aphrodes aestuarina (Edwards, 1908)
- Aphrodes albifrons
- Aphrodes albigera
- Aphrodes astrachanicus Emeljanov, 1964
- Aphrodes bicinctus (Schrank, 1776)
- Aphrodes bolivari Melichar, 1902
- Aphrodes brachycephalus Linnavuori, 1979
- Aphrodes brachyptera China, 1938
- Aphrodes carinatus Stål, 1864
- Aphrodes costata Panzer, 1799
- Aphrodes daiwenicus Kuoh, 1981
- Aphrodes diminuta Ribaut, 1952
- Aphrodes elongatus Lethierry, 1876
- Aphrodes falklandica Enderlein, 1912
- Aphrodes fisulii Logvinenko, 1983
- Aphrodes furcillatus Sáringer, 1959
- Aphrodes gurjevae Emeljanov, 1972
- Aphrodes hamiltoni Quartau & Borges, 2003
- Aphrodes laevus Rey, 1891
- Aphrodes lusitanicus Rodrigues, 1968
- Aphrodes makarovi Zachvatkin, 1948
- Aphrodes montanus Vilbaste, 1965
- Aphrodes nisamianus Logvinenko, 1983
- Aphrodes nuristanicus Dlabola, 1957
- Aphrodes ochromelas Gmelin, 1789
- Aphrodes paralongus Dlabola, 1960
- Aphrodes peltastes Burmeister, 1835
- Aphrodes petrophilus Lindberg, 1954
- Aphrodes puella Curtis, 1837
- Aphrodes pulcher Dlabola, 1960
- Aphrodes samuricus Tshmir, 1977
- Aphrodes siracusae Matsumura, 1908
- Aphrodes thais Linnavuori, 1979
