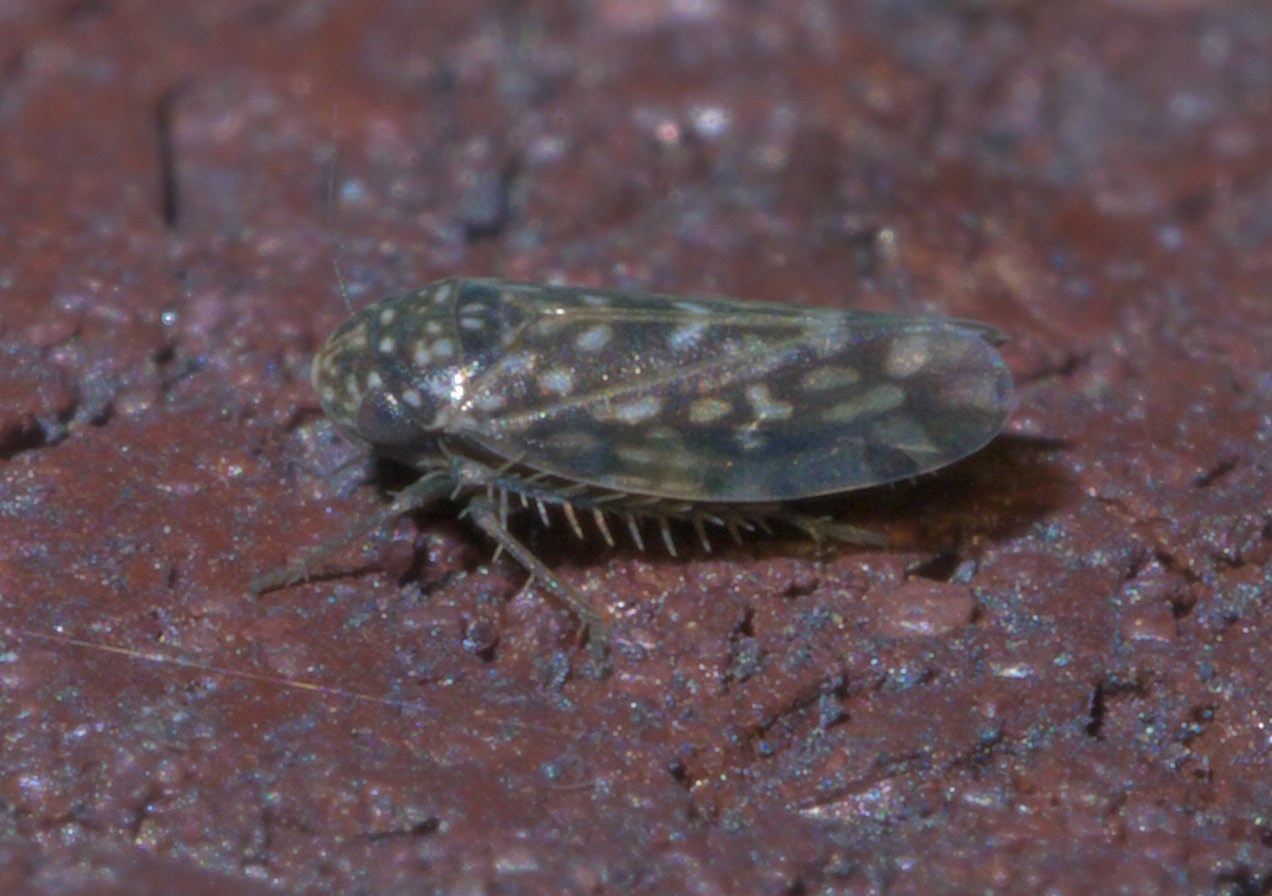

Scientific classification
- Kingdom: Animalia
- Phylum: Arthropoda
- Class: Insecta
- Order: Hemiptera
- Suborder: Auchenorrhyncha
- Family: Cicadellidae
- Genus: Xestocephalus
- Species: X. lunatus

Binomial name
- Xestocephalus lunatus Peters, 1933

= Xestocephalus lunatus =

Species of true bug

Xestocephalus lunatus is a species of leafhopper in the family Cicadellidae.

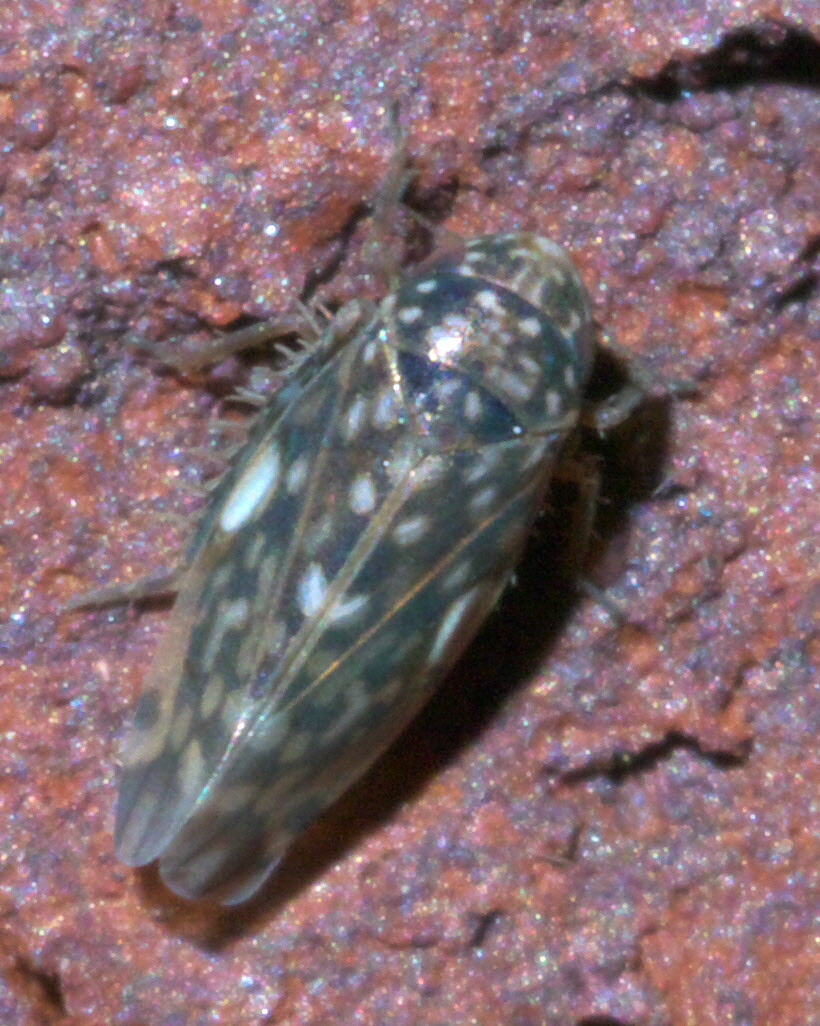
