= International Association of Bryologists =

Professional association promoting bryology

The International Association of Bryologists (IAB), established in 1969, is a professional association promoting bryology (the study of mosses, liverworts and hornworts) globally for both amateurs and professionals. IAB was established in 1969 at the XI International Botanical Congress in Seattle, Washington, with the goal of increasing cooperation between professional and amateur biologists throughout the world. The organization sponsors conferences and meetings relating to bryology, and sponsors the publication of The Bryological Times and Advances of Bryology. Together with the International Union for Conservation of Nature (IUCN), they compiled the first red list of endangered bryophytes in 1997.

== Awardees ==
- Noris Salazar Allen - (Riclef Grolle Award for Excellence in Bryodiversity Research - 2013)
