= Errhomeninae =

Scientific classification
- Kingdom: Animalia
- Phylum: Arthropoda
- Class: Insecta
- Order: Hemiptera
- Suborder: Auchenorrhyncha
- Family: Cicadellidae
- Subfamily: Errhomeninae; Fieber, 1872

Insect subfamily of the family Cicadellidae

Errhomeninae is an insect subfamily of the family Cicadellidae, or the leafhoppers. It contains 3 tribes.

== Classification ==
Bathysmatophorini Anufriev, 1978

1. † Ambericarda Szwedo & Gębicki, 1998
2. Ankosus Oman & Musgrave, 1975
3. Babacephala Ishihara, 1958
4. Bathysmatophorus Sahlberg, 1871
5. Carsonus Oman, 1938
6. Diodontophorus Huh & Kwon, 1994
7. Errhomus Oman, 1938
8. Erronus Hamilton & Zack, 1999
9. Hylaius Oman & Musgrave, 1975
10. † Jantarivacanthus Szwedo, 2005
11. Lystridea Baker, 1898
12. † Mesojassoides Oman, 1937
13. Oniroxis China, 1925
14. Thatuna Oman, 1938

Errhomenini Fieber, 1872

- Errhomenus Fieber, 1866

Euacanthellini Evans, 1966

- Euacanthella Evans, 1938

=== Malmaemichungiini Kwon, 1983 ===
Recorded only from the Korean peninsula.

- Bannalgaechungia Kwon, 1983
- Koreotettix Huh & Kwon, 1994
- Malmaemichungia Kwon, 1983
- † Rovnotettix Dietrich & Perkovsky, 2020
