= Paul W. Oman =

American entomologist

Paul Wilson Oman (22 February 1908, Garnett, Kansas - 4 April 1996 Corvallis, Oregon) was an American entomologist and a specialist on leafhopper taxonomy.

Paul Oman was born in Kansas in 1908 and was educated at Garnett high school, the University of Kansas (A.B., 1930; A.M., 1935) and the George Washington University (Ph.D., 1941). His MA thesis was titled A generic revision of American Bythoscopinae and South American Jassinae (1935)and his PhD work from George Washington University was on The Nearctic Leafhoppers (Homoptera:Cicadellidae), a generic classification and checklist (1949) which was reviewed by Z.P. Metcalf who called it was "one of the most outstanding recent contributions to the study of one of the most difficult families of the Homoptera." In 1930, Oman joined the United States Department of Agriculture (USDA) as a Junior Entomologist with the Taxonomic unit of the Bureau of Entomology and Plant Quarantine. Specializing in the study of insects as vectors of plant diseases, Oman worked for the U.S.D.A. Entomology Research Division before taking a position at Oregon State University in 1967 to work as a Professor for the Entomology Dept. In 1973, Oman was appointed chairman of the department and two years later, he became Professor Emeritus.

Oman specialized in the study of Auchenorrhyncha. Oman joined as a lieutenant in 1942 and served in the United States Army during World War II and the Korean War, conducting studies on medical entomology and the biological control of insects. Oman worked from 1960 to 1962 at New Delhi as director for the Far East Regional Research Office for the USDA overseeing PL 480 funds to agriculture research. He was the curator of The Oregon State Arthropod Collection from 1967 to 1971, and contributed over 200,000 insects to it.
