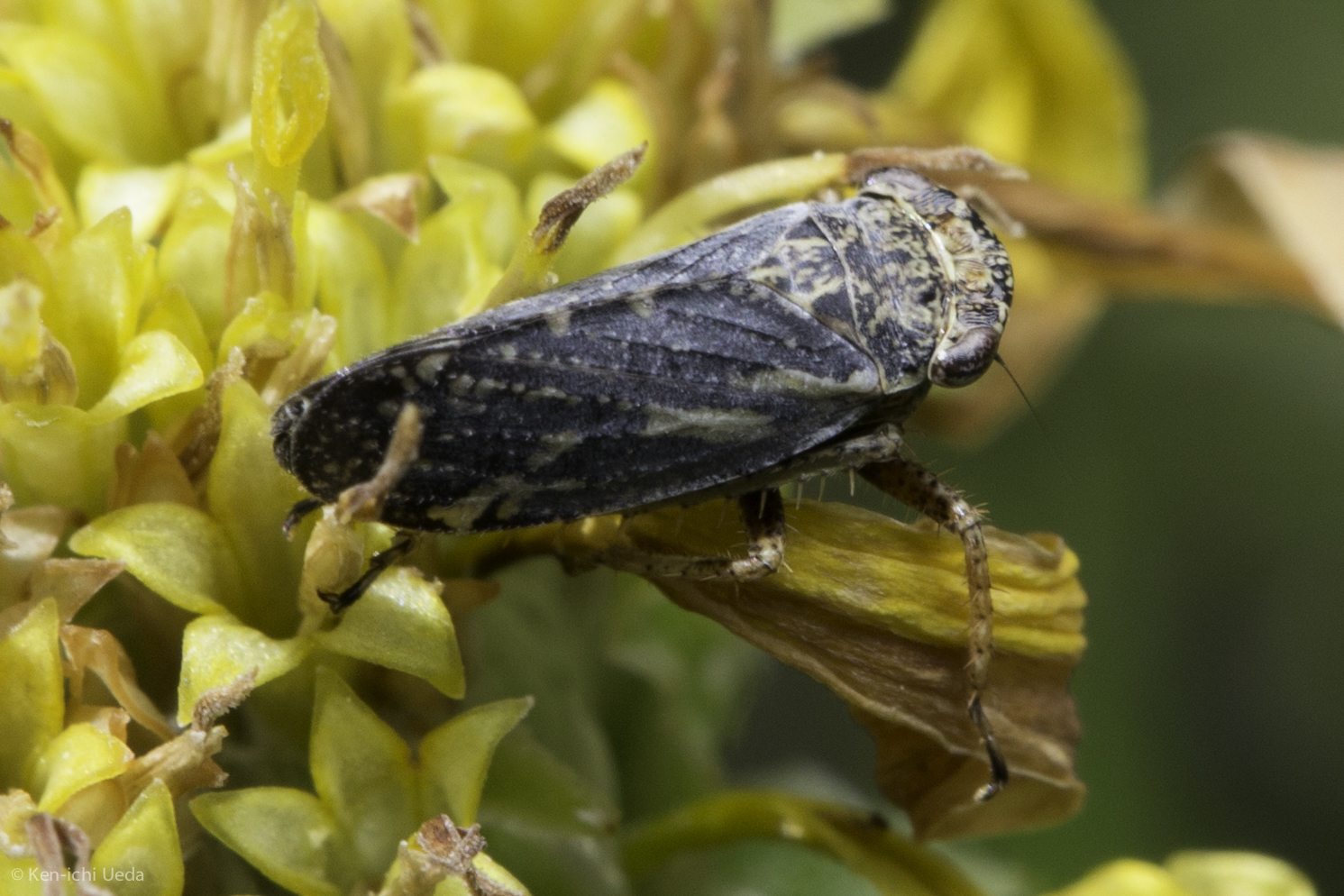

Scientific classification
- Kingdom: Animalia
- Phylum: Arthropoda
- Class: Insecta
- Order: Hemiptera
- Suborder: Auchenorrhyncha
- Family: Cicadellidae
- Subfamily: Errhomeninae
- Tribe: Bathysmatophorini; Anufriev, 1978

Synonyms
- Bathysmatophorinae

= Bathysmatophorini =

Subfamily of leafhoppers

Bathysmatophorini is a tribe of leafhoppers in the subfamily Errhomeninae.

== Description ==
Bathysmatophorini is a rare and basal leafhopper tribe, with species having robust appearance and dull brown or grey colouration. They resemble members of the subfamily Evacanthinae, of which they used to be a part. Many females of this subfamily have short and stubby wings that cannot produce flight.

== Distribution ==
These leafhoppers are found in temperate environments and have only been recorded in the Northern Hemisphere in the Palearctic and Neararctic. In the United States and Canada, they are most often found in the Pacific Northwest, though they can also be found further inland. They are found on Dicotyledon trees, shrubs, and ferns.

== Genera ==
Genera considered members of the Bathysmatophorini are listed below.

- Ambericarda Szwedo & Gebicki, 1998
- Ankosus Oman & Musgrave, 1975
- Babacephala Ishihara, 1958
- Bathysmatophorus Sahlberg, J., 1871
- Carsonus Oman, 1938
- Errhomus Oman, 1938
- Erronus Hamilton & Zack, 1999
- Hylaius Oman & Musgrave, 1975
- Jantarivacanthus Szwedo, 2005
- Koreotettix Huh & Kwon, 1994
- Lystridea Baker, 1898
- Oniroxis China, 1925
- Thatuna Oman, 1938
