= Noris Salazar Allen =

Panamanian bryologist and lichenologist

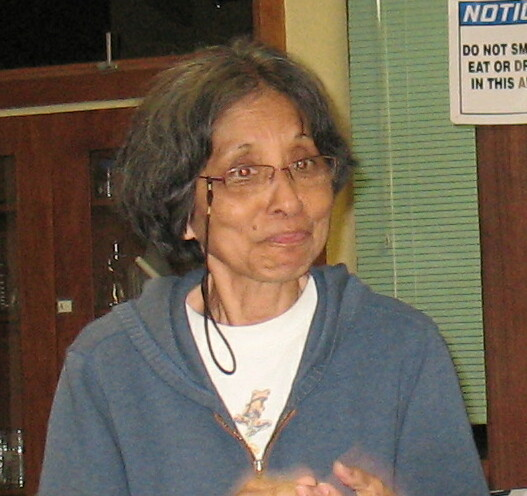
- Salazar Allen in 2017
- Born: 1947 (age 78–79); San Francisco, Panama
- Occupation: Bryologist
- Awards: Riclef Grolle Award for Excellence in Bryodiversity Research

Academic background
- Education: University of Panama; Trinity Washington University; State University of New York; University of Alberta
- Thesis: (1986)
- Doctoral advisor: Dale Vitt

Academic work
- Institutions: University of Panama; Smithsonian Tropical Research Institute

Noris Salazar Allen (born 1947) is a Panamanian bryologist who is Professor of Botany at the University of Panama and an associate researcher at the Smithsonian Tropical Research Institute. She was the first Panamanian to research bryophytes, and was instrumental in expanding the University of Panama's bryological collection to 10,000 specimens. In 2013 she received the Riclef Grolle Award for Excellence in Bryodiversity Research from the International Association of Bryologists.

== Biography ==
Salazar Allen was born in 1947 in the town of San Francisco, which is on the outskirts of Panama City. She spent two years at the University of Panama before she graduated with a BA from Trinity Washington University in 1969. This was followed by a Master of Arts from the State University of New York at Geneseo in 1973. There she was inspired to learn more about bryophytes and their ecology. She subsequently was awarded a PhD from the University of Alberta in 1986. Her supervisor was Dale Vitt, and her thesis focussed on the moss genus Leucophanes.

On her return to Panama, she was appointed assistant professor in the Department of Botany and began to systematically study and record the country's bryophytes. As a result of her research the University of Panama's Herbarium Collection expanded from 50 bryological specimens (originally collected by Marshall Crosby) to over 10,000. Specimens collected by Salazar are also part of the herbarium collection at New York Botanic Garden. DNA samples from other specimens collected by her are also held at the Royal Botanic Garden Edinburgh. Subsequent research projects have included a revision of the liverwort genus Cyathodium at the suggestion of Hélène Bischler, and of the moss Octoblepharum. Her research also examines how climate crisis affects bryophyte communities.

Salazar Allen was appointed Professor of Botany at the University of Panama, as well as holding a research associateship at the Smithsonian Tropical Research Institute. During her career she has named four species and three sub-species that are new to western science.

== Awards ==
- Riclef Grolle Award for Excellence in Bryodiversity Research (International Association of Bryologists) - 2013

== Selected works ==
- Nelson, Jessica M., et al. "Complete genomes of symbiotic cyanobacteria clarify the evolution of vanadium-nitrogenase." Genome biology and evolution 11.7 (2019): 1959-1964.
- Horwath, Aline B., et al. "Bryophyte stable isotope composition, diversity and biomass define tropical montane cloud forest extent." Proceedings of the Royal Society B: Biological Sciences 286.1895 (2019): 20182284.
- Liu, Jian‐Wei, et al. "Gigantic chloroplasts, including bizonoplasts, are common in shade‐adapted species of the ancient vascular plant family Selaginellaceae." American journal of botany 107.4 (2020): 562-576.
- Allen, Noris Salazar, and José A. Gudiño. "Octoblepharumperistomiruptum (Octoblepharaceae) a new species from the Neotropics." PhytoKeys 164 (2020): 1.
- Mežaka, Anna, et al. "Life on a leaf: The development of spatial structure in epiphyll communities." Journal of Ecology 110.3 (2022): 619-630.
- Allen, Noris Salazar, et al. "Bryophytes of mangroves of Bocas del Toro, Panama." Bryophyte Diversity and Evolution 45.1 (2022): 133-150.
