= Barro Colorado Island =

Man-made island in Panama

Coordinates: 9°09′N 79°51′W

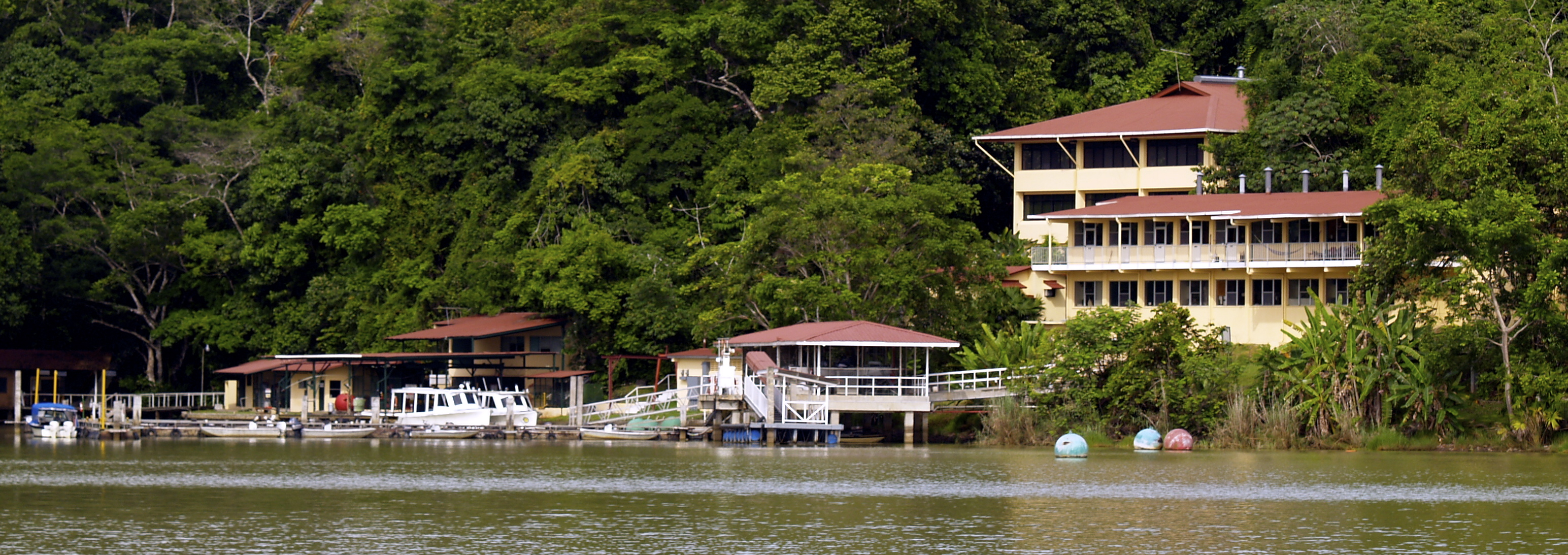
The Barro Colorado Research Station is run by the Smithsonian Tropical Research Institute.

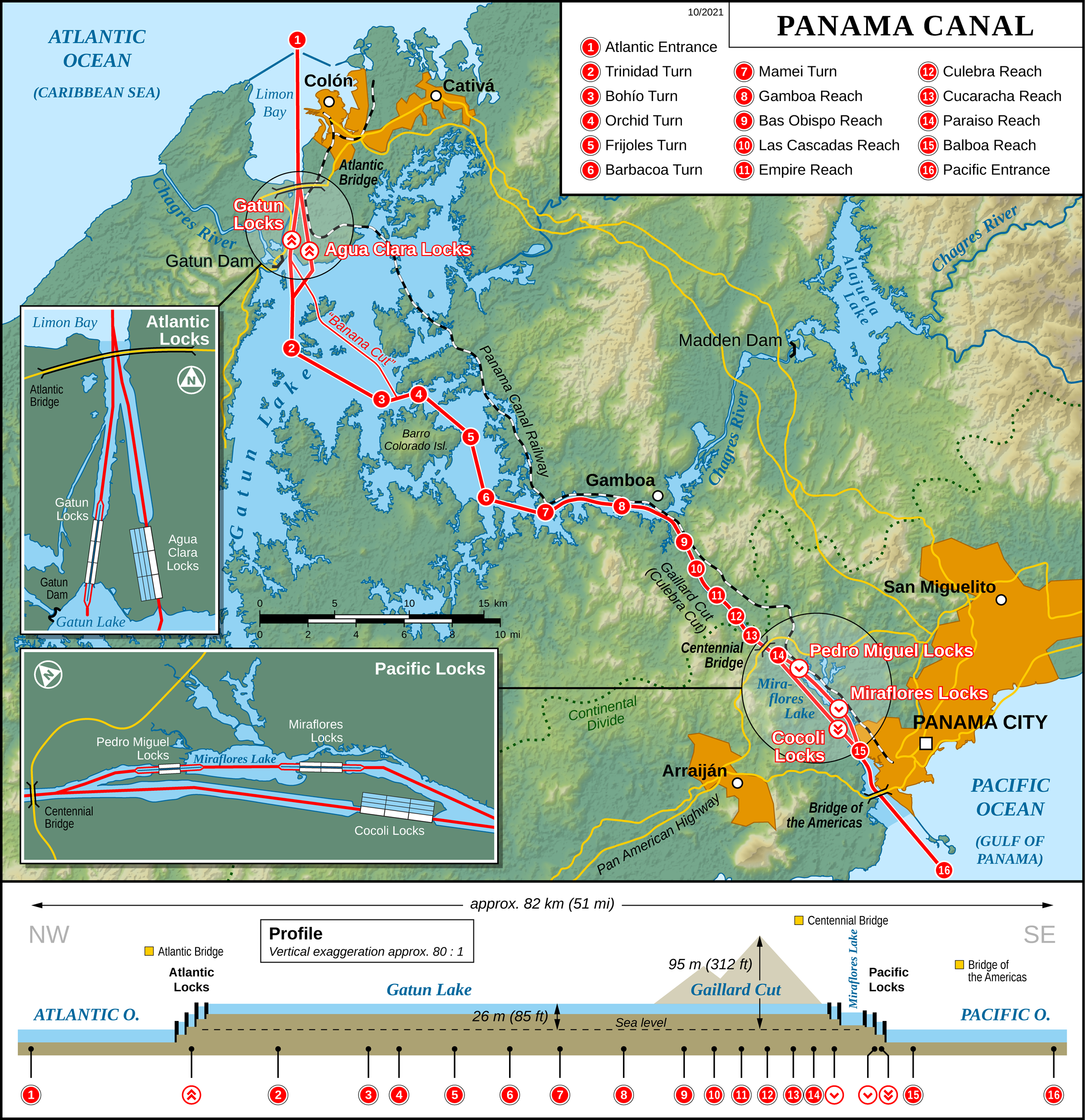
A schematic of the Panama Canal, showing Barro Colorado Island in the middle left.

Barro Colorado Island is located in the man-made Gatun Lake in the middle of the Panama Canal. The island was formed when the waters of the Chagres River were dammed to form the lake in 1913. When the waters rose, they covered a significant part of the existing tropical forest, but certain hilltops remained as islands in the middle of the lake. It has an area of 15.6 km^{2} (6.0 sq mi).

== History ==
The island was set aside as a nature reserve on April 17, 1923, by the U.S. Government. Initially administered by the Panama Canal Company under the direction of James Zetek, since 1946 Barro Colorado Island has been administered by the Smithsonian, together with five adjacent peninsulas, as the Barro Colorado Nature Monument. This Monument has an area of 54 km^{2} (21 sq mi). It is among the most-studied areas of tropical forest in the world. The Nature Monument has been designated an Important Bird Area (IBA) by BirdLife International.

The Smithsonian Tropical Research Institute (STRI) has a permanent research center on the island, dedicated to studying tropical forest ecosystems. Because the Island's diverse ecosystem has been very little altered by humans, Barro Colorado has been studied for over eighty years within a great variety of biological disciplines. Only the larger fauna disappeared from Barro Colorado after the lake was flooded in 1914. Many scientific studies have been conducted to document the changes in the species composition of the island. Hundreds of scientists conduct research projects on Barro Colorado Island every year.

In 1978, Thomas Croat published his Flora of Barro Colorado Island documenting the plant species on the island. In 1999, Egbert Giles Leigh, who first visited the island in 1966, and now spends half his week there, published Tropical Forest Ecology : A View from Barro Colorado Island. In 2002 The Tapir's Morning Bath by Elizabeth Royte was published, chronicling the lives and work of scientists working on the island.

National Geographic produced a documentary featuring the Barro Colorado Island titled World's Last Great Places: Rain Forests released in 2007. The first selection, titled Panama Wild: Rain Forest of Life features scientists from the Smithsonian's Tropical Research Institute and also highlights the battles for survival and partnerships among species within this rich ecosystem.

== Forest dynamics plot ==
In 1980, a 50-hectare (120-acre) forest dynamics plot was established on Barro Colorado Island by researchers from STRI and Princeton University. The first census was conducted in 1982 and recorded every free-standing tree and shrub in the plot of more than 1 cm dbh, totalling approximately 240,000 stems of 303 different species. It has been recensused every five years since 1985, allowing scientists to study the normal dynamics of the forest, as well as extreme events, such as El Niño. Another 50-ha plot was later established in the Pasoh Forest Reserve, Malaysia in 1987, allowing the dynamics of two distinct tropical forests to be compared.

== Visiting ==
Visitors are allowed on Barro Colorado Island. Access is, however, regulated by STRI. To visit the island, people must make a reservation with the staff and arrange for a tour. Tours generally include transportation to and from the island (often by boat from Gamboa), a 2–3 hour guided hike, lunch, and a visit to the museum. Hikes through the island offer the opportunity to spot several animals including monkeys, anteaters, birds and insects.

== National Emergency ==
U.S. federal law states that the natural features of the island shall "be left in their natural state for scientific observation and investigation", "except in event of declared national emergency."

U.S. federal law no longer applies, as the Panama Canal Zone was incorporated back into Panama in 1979.
