= Henk Wolda =

Dutch entomologist (born 1940)

Henk Wolda (born 25 May 1931) is a Dutch entomologist. He was an employee at the Smithsonian Tropical Research Institute (STRI) in Panama, where he studied insects. During the 1980s he was one of the top publishers on biodiversity based in Panama. His papers from circa 1974 to 1990 are kept in the Smithsonian Institution Archives. His insect collection is held at the STRI, and derived from performing light trapping techniques, with large numbers coming from Barro Colorado Island.

Wolda was born in Wageningen. He was elected a corresponding member of the Royal Netherlands Academy of Arts and Sciences in 1980. After his retirement he lived in Bellevue, Washington, United States.
