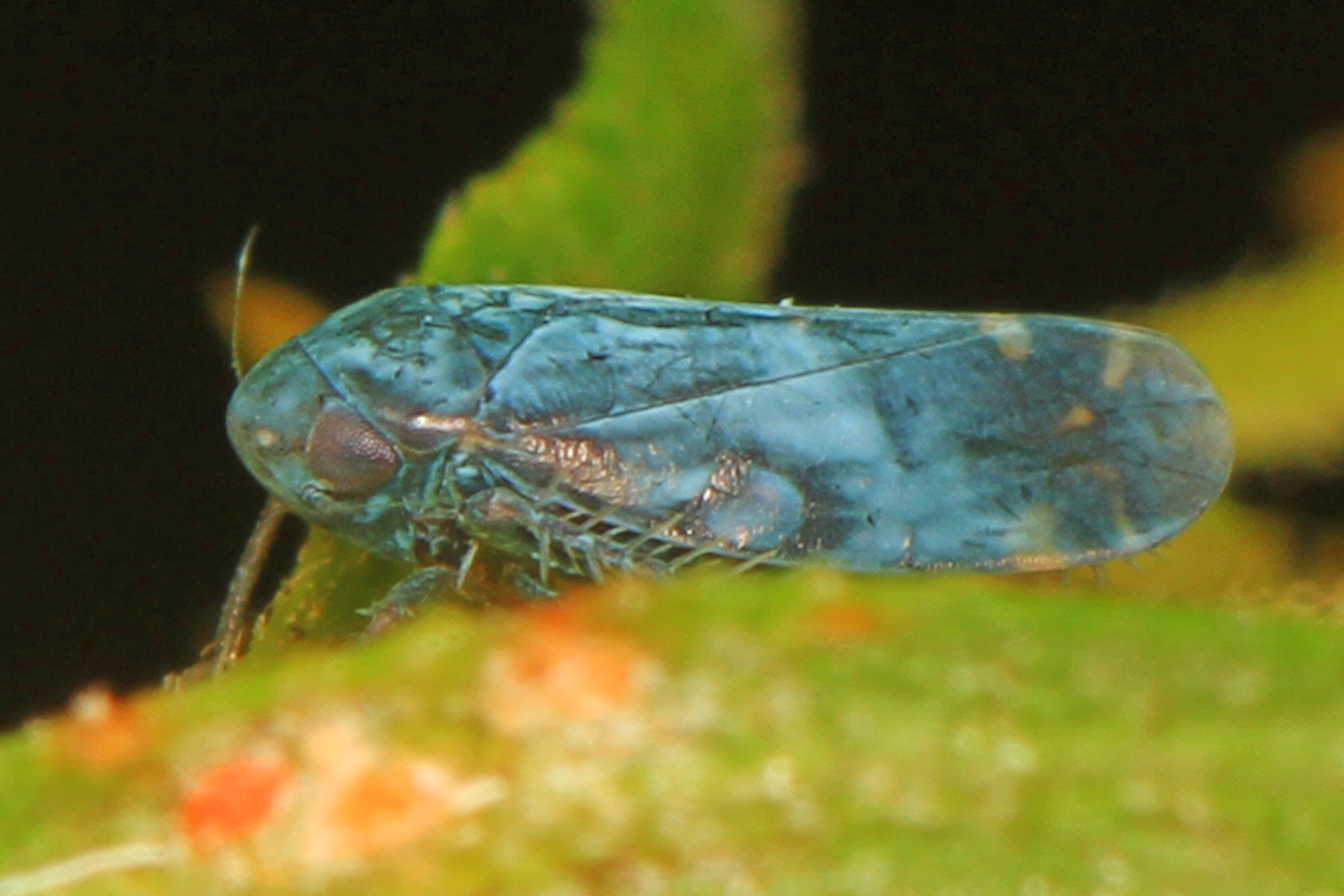
- Xestocephalus brunneus

Scientific classification
- Kingdom: Animalia
- Phylum: Arthropoda
- Class: Insecta
- Order: Hemiptera
- Suborder: Auchenorrhyncha
- Family: Cicadellidae
- Subfamily: Aphrodinae
- Genus: Xestocephalus; Van Duzee, 1892

Synonyms
- List: Lindbergana Metcalf, 1952; Nesotettix Lindberg, 1936; Xestpcephalus Van Duzee, 1892; Xestrocephalus Van Duzee, 1892; Xextocephalus Van Duzee, 1892; Zestocephalus Van Duzee, 1892

= Xestocephalus =

Genus of leafhoppers

Xestocephalus is a genus of leafhoppers (family Cicadellidae). There are at least 120 described species in the genus Xestocephalus.

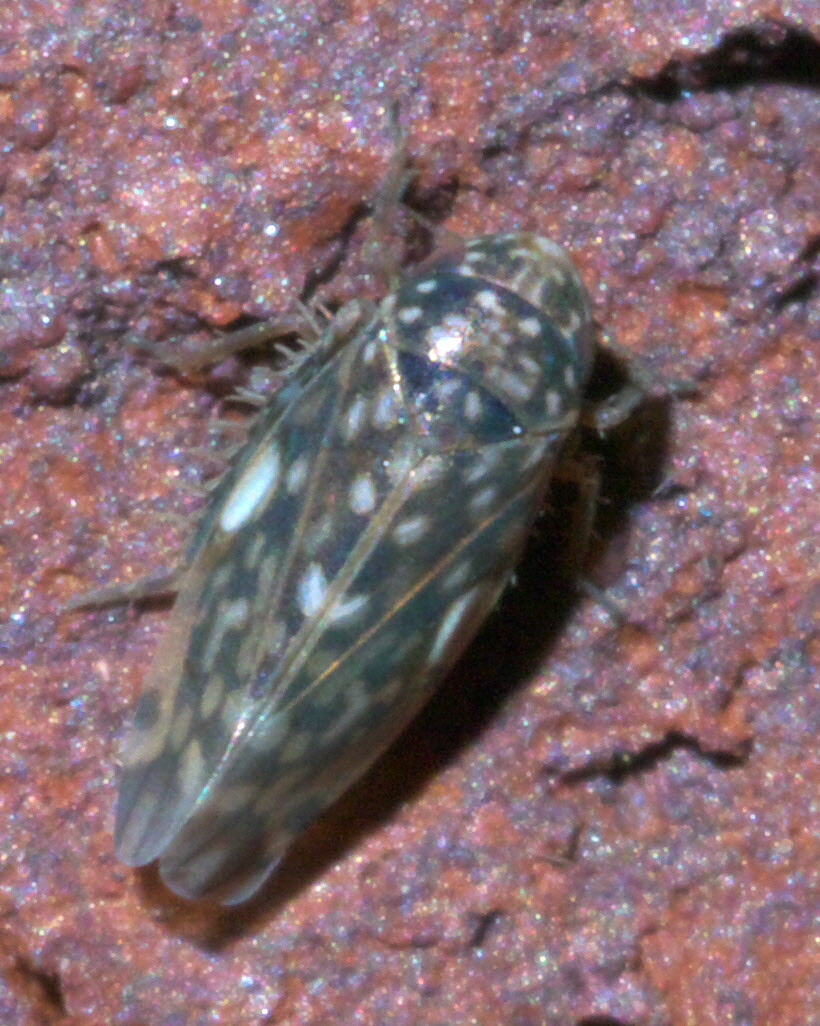
Xestocephalus lunatus

== See also ==
- List of Xestocephalus species
