= Elizabeth Royte =

American science/nature writer

Elizabeth Royte is an American science/nature writer. She is best known for her books Garbage Land (a New York Times Notable Book of the Year 2005), The Tapir's Morning Bath: Solving the Mysteries of the Tropical Rain Forest (a New York Times Notable Book of the Year, 2001), Bottlemania: How Water Went on Sale and Why We Bought It (a "Best of" or "Top 10" book of 2008 in Entertainment Weekly, Seed and Plenty magazines) and A Place to Go

Royte's articles have appeared in The New York Times Magazine, Harper's, National Geographic, The New York Times Book Review, The New Yorker, The Nation, Outside, Smithsonian, and other magazines. Her work has been featured in the Best American Science Writing 2004 and the "Best American Science Writing 2009." Royte is a former Alicia Patterson Foundation fellow and a recipient of Bard College's John Dewey Award for Distinguished Public Service.

Her article about women who survived the genocide in Rwanda attracted attention. She has traveled to research her articles and books.

== Selected works ==
=== Books ===
- (2001) The Tapir's Morning Bath: Mysteries of the Tropical Rain Forest and the Scientists Who Are Trying to Solve Them; Boston :Houghton Mifflin
- (2005) Garbage Land; New York :Little, Brown
- (2008) Bottlemania: How Water Went on Sale and Why We Bought It; New York :Bloomsbury

=== Essays and reporting ===
- Royte, Elizabeth (August 2017). "A place to go". National Geographic. 232 (2): 94–119.
