= Smithsonian Tropical Research Institute =

Research institute in Panama

Coordinates: 8.9624308°N 79.5525621°W

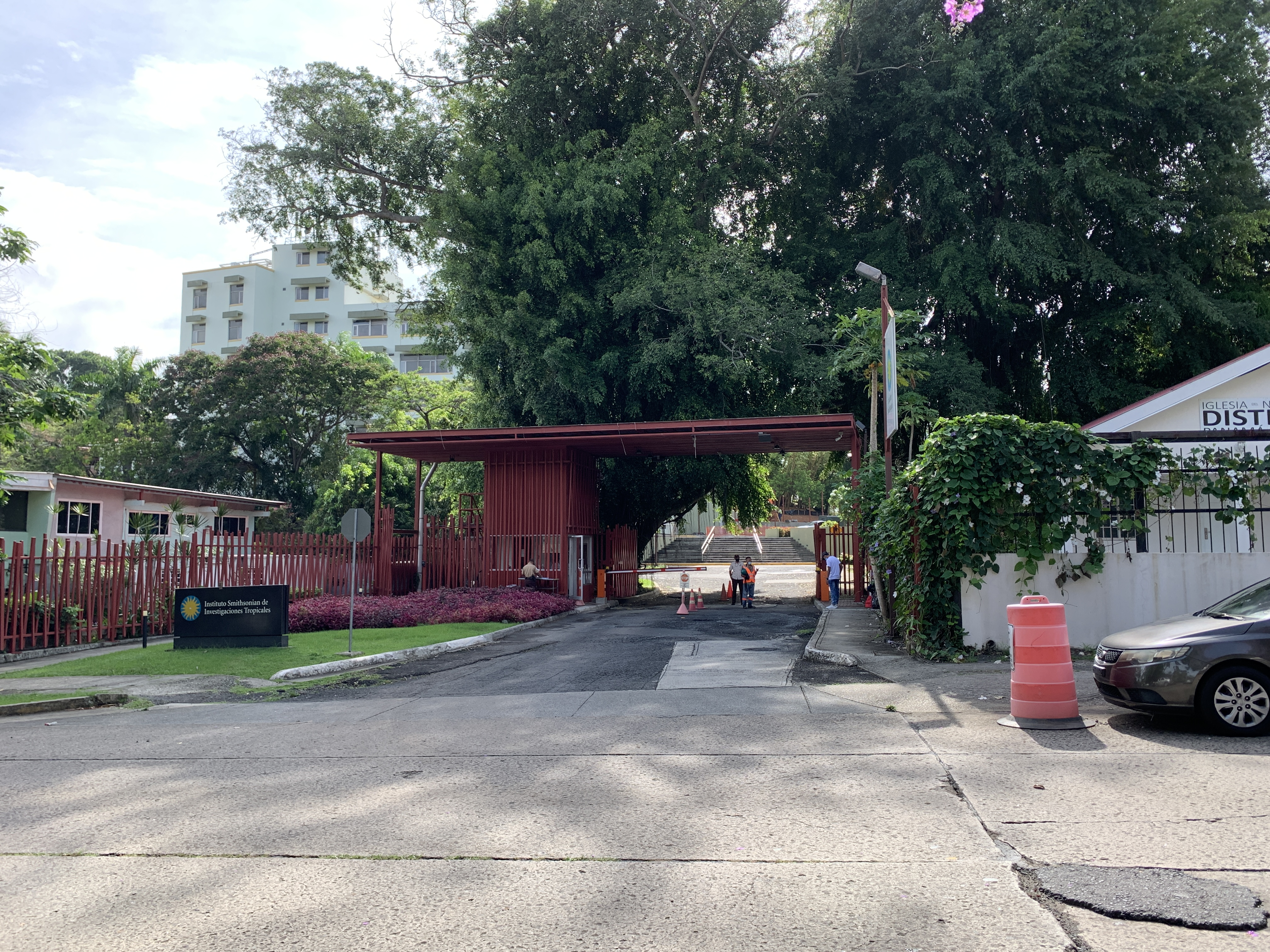
Headquarters entrance

The Smithsonian Tropical Research Institute (STRI, Spanish: Instituto Smithsonian de Investigaciones Tropicales) is located in Panama and is the only bureau of the Smithsonian Institution based outside of the United States. It is dedicated to understanding the past, present, and future of tropical ecosystems and their relevance to human welfare. STRI grew out of a small field station established in 1923 on Barro Colorado Island in the Panama Canal Zone to become one of the world's leading tropical research organizations. STRI's facilities provide for long-term ecological studies in the tropics and are used by some 1,200 visiting scientists from academic and research institutions around the world every year.

== History ==
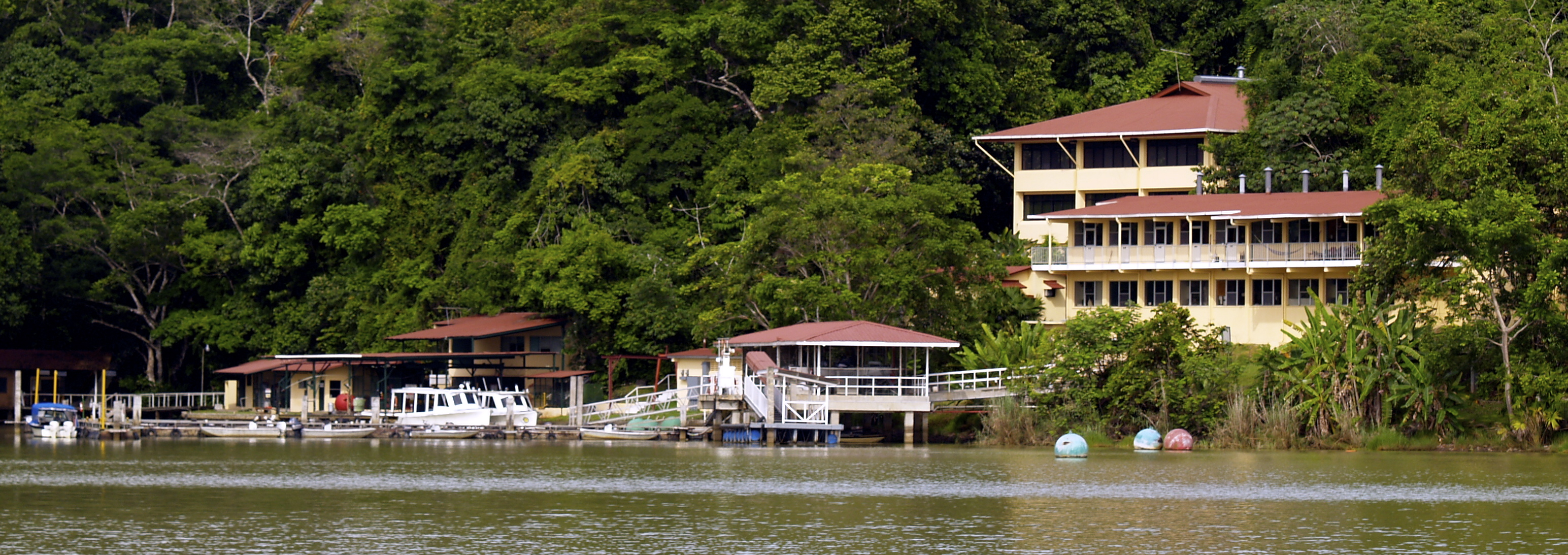
Barro Colorado Research Station

Smithsonian scientists first came to Panama during the construction of the Panama Canal from 1904 to 1914. The Secretary of the Smithsonian Institution, Charles Doolittle Walcott, reached an agreement with Federico Boyd to conduct a biological inventory of the new Canal Zone in 1910, and this survey was subsequently extended to include all of Panama. Thanks largely to their efforts, the governor of the Canal Zone declared Barro Colorado Island (BCI) a biological reserve in 1923, making it one of the earliest biological reserves in the Americas. During the 1920s and 1930s BCI, in Gatun Lake, became an outdoor laboratory for scientists from U.S. universities and the Smithsonian Institution. By 1940, when BCI was designated the Canal Zone Biological Area (CZBA), more than 300 scientific publications had described the biota of BCI. In the Government Reorganization Act of 1946, BCI became a bureau of the Smithsonian Institution. The Smithsonian Tropical Research Institute (STRI) was created in 1966.

With the establishment of STRI, permanent staff scientists were hired and fellowship programs were initiated to support aspiring tropical biologists. The first director after the name change was Martin Humphrey Moynihan. A strong relationship with the Republic of Panama was formalized in the Panama Canal Treaties of 1977, which gradually transferred control of the Canal Zone to Panama. The treaties created the Barro Colorado Nature Monument, which included BCI and five surrounding peninsulas, and granted STRI custody of the monument. Panama granted STRI International Mission status in 1985 and, in 1997, the nation extended STRI's custodianship of facilities beyond the culmination of the Panama Canal Treaties in 1999.

STRI's first director after the institute's establishment in 1966 was Martin Humphrey Moynihan. Geographer and scientist Charles F. Bennett, along with his wife, Anna Carole Bennett, participated in STRI during the 1960s, assisting in the organizing of the library, researching and collecting microclimate data, and studying neotropical forests. In 1966, Bennett became an honorary Research Associate of STRI. A large collection of papers by STRI researchers at Barro Colorado Island was published as an anthology in 1982, The Ecology of a Tropical Rainforest.

STRI has an average of 350 ongoing research projects and publishes more than 400 peer-reviewed articles in scientific journals every year.

== Purpose ==
STRI's research facilities allow staff scientists, fellows and visiting scientists to achieve their research objectives. Most of STRI's staff scientists reside in the tropics and are encouraged to pursue their own research priorities without geographic limitations. The continuity of their long-term programs enables in-depth investigations that attract an elite group of fellows and visitors. Active support for fellows and visitors leverages resources further and attracts more than 1,200 scientists to STRI each year.

== Academic programs ==
STRI hosts 10–15 university field courses every year. Participating universities include Princeton, McGill, Northeastern, Wisconsin Green Bay, Yale, Harvard, Ohio State, Arizona State, Marquette, Texas A&M Butler, Cambridge, Dartmouth College, University of Vermont, and Southern Illinois. STRI also runs an intensive field course for Panamanian and Central American undergraduates. Since 1965, STRI has supported some 5,500 fellows and interns of various academic levels, from undergraduate, master and PhD students, to postdoctoral and senior researchers.

== Barro Colorado Nature Monument ==
The Barro Colorado Nature Monument includes the 16 km² Barro Colorado Island, which is covered with tropical forest and boasts a nearly intact mammal fauna. It also includes 40 km² of surrounding mainland peninsulas covered by forests in various stages of succession, serving as a site for manipulative field experiments. The monument adjoins Panama's 220 km² Soberania National Park.

With a store of background information from around a century of research in a protected setting, Barro Colorado Island has become a major global center for tropical research.

Barro Colorado is open for public day visits, but advance reservations must be made.

== Other research sites ==
Although STRI is based in Panama, research is conducted throughout the tropics. The Smithsonian's Forest Global Earth Observatory (ForestGEO) network (formerly CTFS, Center for Tropical Forest Science) uses standard study protocols to monitor more than 70 forest plots in 28 countries across Africa, Asia, Europe and the Americas. The protocols were developed on BCI in the early 1980s. More than six million individual trees representing 12,000 species are being studied.

STRI's Biological Diversity of Forest Fragments project created experimental forest fragments of 0.01, 0.1, and 1.0 km² to study the consequences of landscape transformation on forest integrity in the central Amazon region. STRI marine scientists are conducting a global survey of levels of genetic isolation in coral reef organisms.

=== Facilities in Panama City ===
STRI is headquartered at the Earl S. Tupper Research, Library and Conference Center in Ancón, Panama City. STRI has other installations around Panama City including the Center for Tropical Paleoecology and Archaeology, a Canopy Access Crane system in the Parque Natural Metropolitano (with a sister crane in the San Lorenzo National Park on Panama's Caribbean slope), and the Naos Marine and Molecular Laboratories on the Amador Causeway. The marine laboratory has a dock, wet lab and scientific diving office, facilitating research in the Gulf of Panama.

The causeway, which is at the Pacific entrance to the Panama Canal, is also home to STRI's visitor center, the Punta Culebra Nature Center, which is open year-round to the general public and school groups.

=== Facilities elsewhere in Panama ===
STRI has laboratories in the town of Gamboa, which is abutted by Soberanía National Park, the Panama Canal and the Chagres River in central Panama. The Gamboa labs facilitate research on forest ecology, animal behavior, plant physiology, evolution and other disciplines. Adjacent to Soberanía, STRI has the 700-hectare Panama Canal Watershed Experiment, which studies multiple land-use practices to determine their impact on hydrology, carbon storage and potential for reforestation.

STRI has two Caribbean marine laboratories. One is the small facility of Punta Galeta Marine Laboratory near the city of Colón, at the Caribbean entrance to the Panama Canal. The other is the Bocas del Toro Research Station, a modern marine laboratory on Isla Colón within one mile of downtown Bocas del Toro. The research station has a dock, dive locker and a fleet of small research vessels that provide access to mangrove, seagrass and coral reef ecosystems.

The Fortuna Field Station provides access to montane forest in western Panama.

STRI has a small field station is on the island of Coibita in Coiba National Park. The station provides access to the 500-km^{2} Coiba Island and extensive coral reef systems of the Eastern Tropical Pacific.

== Directors ==
The following served an director of the Smithsonian Tropical Research Institute or its predecessors, the Barro Colorado Island Biological Laboratory and the Canal Zone Biological Area:

No.	Portrait	Director	Term start	Term end	Refs.
1		James Zetek (Note: During Zetek's tenure, the Barro Colorado Island Biological Laboratory was renamed the Canal Zone Biological Area in 1940 and placed under federal control. In 1946, it was transferred to the Smithsonian Institution.)	1923	May 31, 1956	v=
2		Carl B. Koford	1956	1957	
3		Martin Moynihan (Note: During Moynihan's tenure, the CZBA was renamed the Smithsonian Tropical Research Institute.)	1957	1973	
4		Ira Rubinoff (Note: Rubinoff also served as the Acting Under Secretary for Science for the Smithsonian Institution in Washington, D.C., from 2007 until 2008.)	1974	2008	
acting		Eldredge Bermingham	March 2007	September 27, 2008	
5		Eldredge Bermingham	September 28, 2008	2013	
acting		William Wcislo	2013	August 10, 2014	
6		Matthew C. Larsen	August 11, 2014	June 30, 2020	
acting		Oris I. Sanjur	July 1, 2020	July 5, 2021	
7		Joshua Tewksbury	July 6, 2021	present	

Table Notes:

== Notable researchers ==
- Noris Salazar Allen, bryologist
- Henk Wolda, entomologist

== Controversy ==
An article released by Buzzfeed News in 2021 told the story of 16 women who experienced "a pattern of sexual misconduct by high-ranking men at the institute, one of whom acknowledged his inappropriate behavior". Incidents included verbal harassments, physical sexual assault, unwanted attention, and have resulted in the widespread call for changes within the Institute. The fallout has included the firing of employees, an internal investigation, individuals being stripped of their titles, and institutional resources being made available. However, many victims still face retaliation from the accused, including the withholding of data.

Josh Tewksbury, who was appointed director of STRI in July 2021, says of the STRI's measures to safeguard employees since the conclusion of the investigation: "We have been working with the people that came forward for the BuzzFeed article, engaging them in the process of how we make STRI a more safe place. " he says. "We've been just overwhelmed and really thankful with the degree to which those individuals have, have been willing to engage."

A call for locks on doors where researchers slept occurred after the assault of a female scientist at the STRI by a male scientist. This was detailed in a December 9th 2020 letter to the White House Gender Policy Council (GPC), written by Laura Dunn, a victim's rights attorney and the legal representative for the victims. The STRI receives federal funding, awarded from a committee on which the US Vice President sits, which was the reason for the letter. From an article in Nature: "Tewksbury says that all bedrooms now have lockable doors, but he notes that such safeguards are impractical in field sites, where researchers sleep in tents."

Another measure that has been taken is by changing the way that fellowship positions are awarded in the Institute to avoid the extremely unbalanced power dynamics that can occur. In an article by Nature: "Tewksbury says that, in an attempt to blunt at least some of the power of staff scientists, the STRI is changing how junior researchers are awarded fellowships. In the past, staff scientists would discuss among themselves which researchers might be worthy of fellowships and match the fellows with mentors. The new process puts more emphasis on the potential and credentials of the trainees than on the preferences and persuasiveness of mentors, he says."

Additionally, the Smithsonian launched the SI Civil Program, allowing people to report misconduct through a hotline.
