= Hebrew Technical Institute =

High School in New York City, USA

Coordinates: 40.729803°N 73.98797°W

Information
- Established: 1884
- Closed: 1939

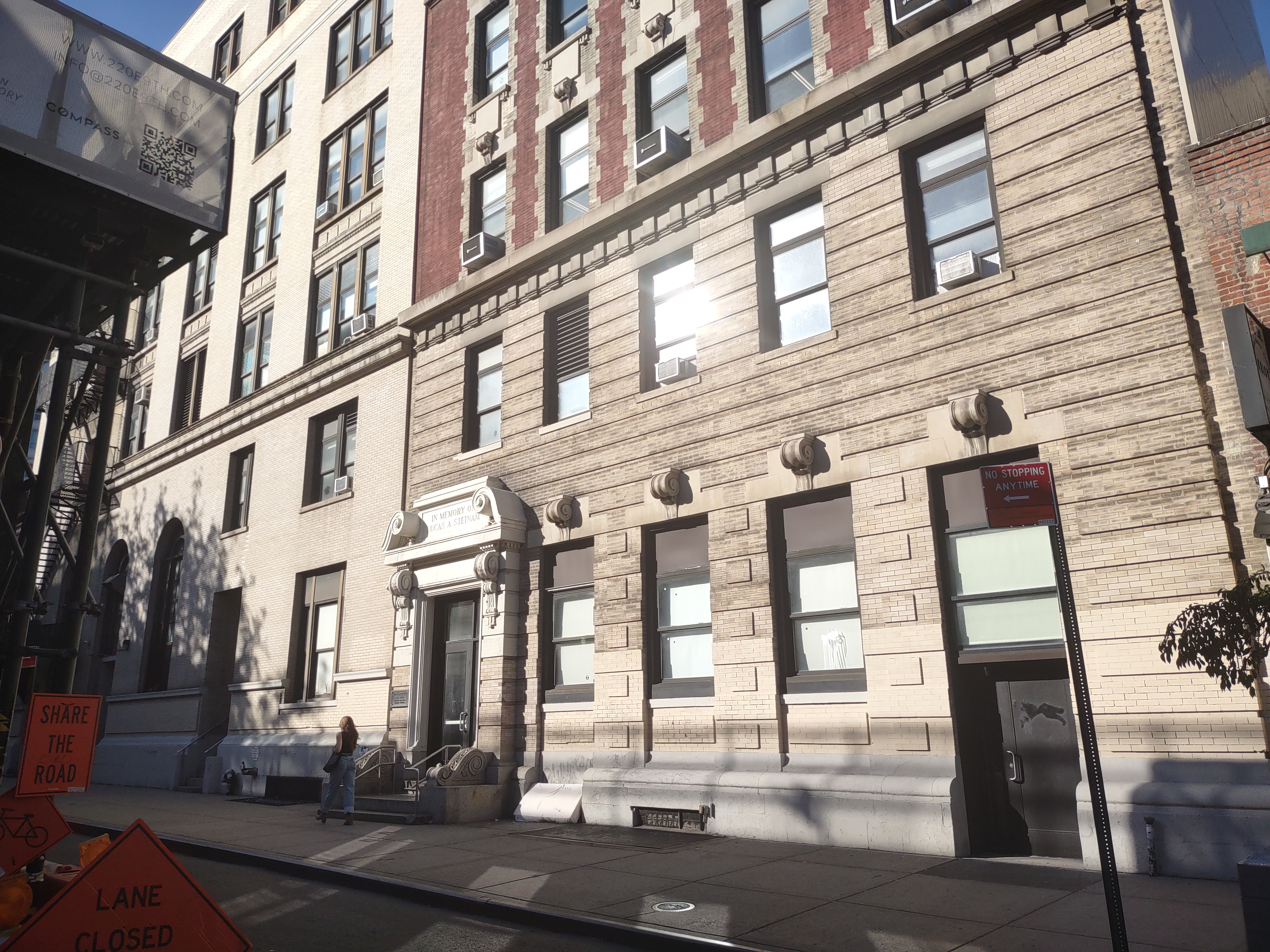

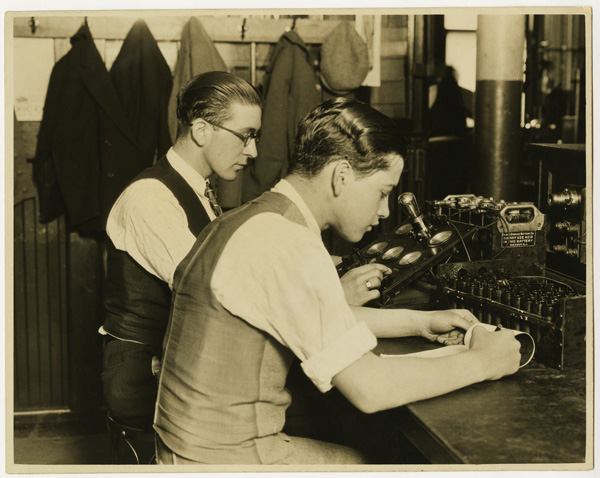
Vocational guidance, Hebrew Technical Institute, circa 1920

Hebrew Technical Institute was a vocational high school in New York City. Founded by Henry M. Leipziger, the school was established on January 7, 1884 and closed in 1939.

After completing two years at the school, students could specialize in wood-working, pattern making, metal working, instrument making, mechanical drawing, architectural drawing, wood carving, free-hand drawing or applied electricity.

The school was founded after three Hebrew charity organizations formed a committee to promote technical education for the many Jewish immigrants arriving in New York at the time. The school originally opened at 206 East Broadway. After a number of relocations, the school moved into 34 and 36 Stuyvesant Street.

== Notable alumni ==
- Bern Dibner, founder of the Burndy Corporation, graduated c. 1916. Also a book collector and scholar in the history of science, founder of the Burndy Library.
- Irving Fierstein (1915- 2009), artist
- Marty Friedman (1889–1986), Hall of Fame pro basketball player and coach
- Arthur Hamerschlag, first President of Carnegie Mellon University, class of 1889
- Nehemiah Persoff, actor
