= Robert E. Kohler =

American chemist and historian (born 1937)

Robert E. Kohler (born 1937) is an American chemist and historian of science, specializing in the life sciences.

== Early life and education ==
In 1959, Kohler graduated from Yale University with a B.A. summa cum laude in chemistry. In 1965, he received his Ph.D. in chemistry from Harvard University. His Ph.D. thesis is entitled Model studies for the synthesis of β-amyrin. From 1965 to 1970 he remained at Harvard as a research fellow, from 1965 to 1968 at Harvard Medical School's microbiology department and from 1968 to 1970 at Harvard University's history of science department. From 1970 to 1973 he was assistant director of the Burndy Library, a library founded in 1941 by Bern Dibner.

== Career ==
In 1973 he joined the faculty of the University of Pennsylvania's department of history and sociology of science, where he was appointed full professor in 1988 and retired as professor emeritus in 2005. He taught courses on the history of American science, the history of technology in war, landscape and environmental history, and science as a social practice. In 1995 he was a visiting professor at the University of California, San Diego.

While Kohler wrote his dissertation on the biochemistry of beta-amyrin, he increasingly turned to topics in the history of science. At the University of Pennsylvania, he gained an international reputation for his research on the history of genetics and biochemistry, as well as the sociology of American science. In his work in 1971/72, he dealt with the background and reception of the discovery of cell-free fermentation by Eduard Buchner, winner of the 1907 Nobel Prize in Chemistry. Kohler later investigated the historical basis of science funding and the history of genetics. In the 1980s he incorporated sociological elements into his studies and showed in 1982 in From Medical Chemistry to Biochemistry: The Making of a Biomedical Discipline that the discipline of biochemistry arose from the conflicts over control of medical schools, particularly between clinical practitioners and researchers. A similar sociological interest led him to investigate the funding mechanisms in the shaping of American science. He published the results in several influential articles and in 1991 in the work Partners in Science: Foundations and Natural Scientists, 1900–1945. In the 2000s he worked on the culture and practice of biology and biodiversity, as well as the history of geographical and biological fieldwork.

Robert E. Kohler was an advisory editor from 1984 to 2011 for Social Studies of Science, from 1987 to 1992 for Isis, and from 1991 to 2001 of the Journal of the History of Biology. In 2005 he became an advisory editor for Nature and Culture. He has published 6 books and more than 30 scientific articles.

In 2004 Kohler received the George Sarton Medal from the History of Science Society (HSS). In 2016 he was elected to the board of trustee of the Pennsylvania Academy of Fine Arts (PAFA).

== Personal life ==
On June 6, 1958, Robert E. Kohler married Frances Coulborn (1938–2021). As an editor and manager, she contributed to the success of the history of science journals Isis and Osiris. She was director of publications for the Chemical Heritage Foundation. Upon her death she was survived by her widower, two sons, and three grandchildren. Frances Kohler was a friend of Wilma Anderson Kerby-Miller.

== Selected publications ==
=== Articles ===
- Kohler, Robert (1971). "The background to Eduard Buchner's discovery of cell-free fermentation". Journal of the History of Biology. 4: 35–61. doi:10.1007/BF00356976. PMID 11609437.
- Kohler, Robert E. (1972). "The reception of Eduard Buchner's discovery of cell-free fermentation". Journal of the History of Biology. 5 (2): 327–353. doi:10.1007/BF00346663. PMID 11610124.
- Kohler, R. E. (2008). "Lab history: reflections". Isis. 99 (4): 761–768. doi:10.1086/595769.

=== Books ===
- From Medical Chemistry to Biochemistry: The Making of a Biomedical Discipline. Cambridge University Press, 1982.
- Partners in Science: Foundations and Natural Scientists, 1900–1945. University of Chicago Press, 1991.
- Lords of the Fly: Drosophila Genetics and the Experimental Life. University of Chicago Press, 1994.
- Landscapes and Labscapes: Exploring the Lab–Field Border in Biology. University of Chicago Press, 2002. abstract & table of contents
- All Creatures: Naturalists, Collectors, and Biodiversity, 1850–1950. Princeton University Press, 2006. 2013 pbk edition
- Inside Science: Stories from the Field in Human and Animal Science. University of Chicago Press. 2019.
