= Adriaen van der Werff =

Dutch painter (1659–1722)

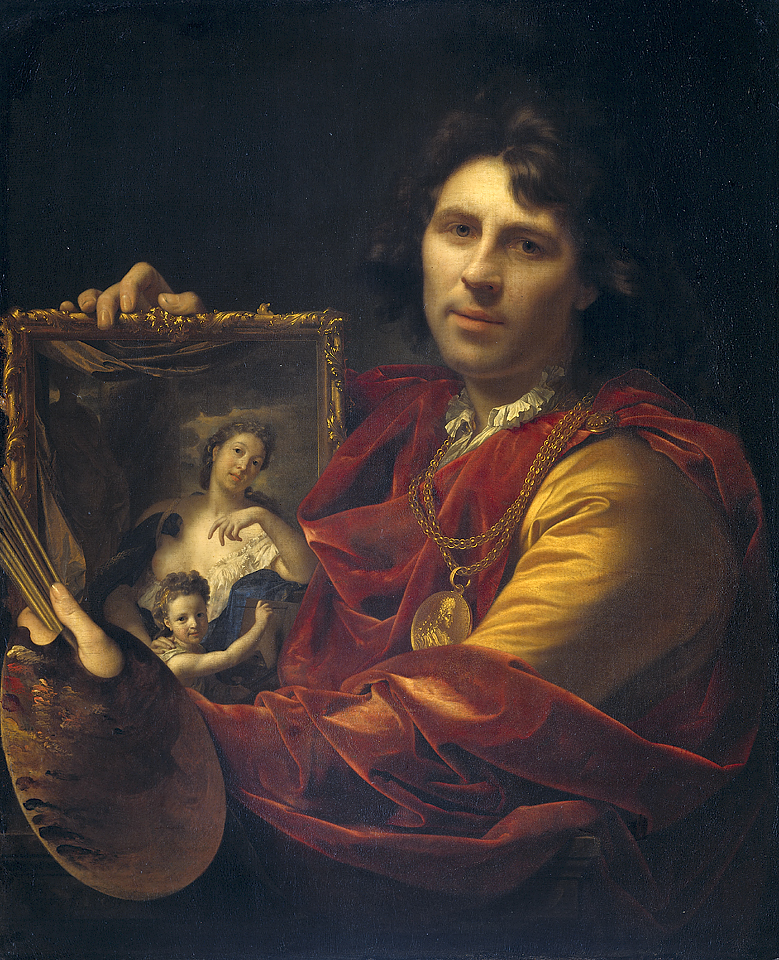
- Self-portrait, 1699, Rijksmuseum.
- Born: 21 January 1659; Kralingen, Dutch Republic (modern-day Netherlands)
- Died: 12 November 1722 (aged 63); Rotterdam, Dutch Republic (modern-day Netherlands)
- Known for: Painting
- Movement: Baroque

Adriaen van der Werff (21 January 1659 – 12 November 1722) was a Dutch painter of portraits and erotic, devotional and mythological scenes. He painted several works for the Medicis. His brother, Pieter van der Werff (1661–1722), was his principal pupil and assistant.

== Life ==
At the age of ten, he began to take lessons, two years later moving in with Eglon van der Neer, specializing in clothes and draperie. At the age of seventeen, he founded his own studio in Rotterdam where he later became the head of guild of Saint Luc. In 1696, he was paid a visit by Johann Wilhelm, Elector Palatine and his wife, Anna Maria Luisa de' Medici. The couple ordered two paintings to be sent to Cosimo III de' Medici, Grand Duke of Tuscany, Anna Maria Luisa's father, in Florence. During the next years Van der Werff traveled regularly between Düsseldorf and his home town.

In 1703, he became the official court painter and a knight, when his former teacher and predecessor Van der Neer died. Van der Werff was paid extremely well by the Elector for his biblical or classical (erotic) paintings. In December 1704, he painted Prince John Churchill, 1st Duke of Marlborough and in 1705, he painted a portrait of Gian Gastone de' Medici, Grand Duke of Tuscany. In 1716, he lost his job when the Elector died and was replaced by Charles III Philip, Elector Palatine. The treasury was then empty. Johann Wilhelm owned 34 paintings made by Van der Werff and were hung in a specially designated room next to Rembrandt's. He refused to have paintings sold to Prince Anthony Ulrich, Duke of Brunswick and King Augustus II the Strong, as he wanted to keep the paintings to himself. The director of the collection was Jan Frans van Douven.

Van der Werff became one of the most lauded Dutch painters of his day, gaining a European reputation and a fortune. Arnold Houbraken, writing in 1718, considered him the greatest of the Dutch painters and this was the prevailing critical opinion throughout the 18th century: however, his reputation suffered in the 19th century, when he was alleged to have betrayed the Dutch naturalistic tradition. In the Victorian Age, people could not appreciate his art, so most of his work went into the cellars of the Alte Pinakothek.

Van der Werff also practised as an architect in Rotterdam, where he designed a few houses. His only daughter married to Flemish painter Adriaen Brouwer.

Famous buyers of his art would later be the King of Prussia Frederick the Great, the King of France Louis XVI, and Dutch banker Adriaan van der Hoop. His works can be seen today at the national museum of the Netherlands, Rijksmuseum, next to the Van Gogh Museum, at the Alte Pinakothek Museum in Munich, Germany, at the Uffizi Gallery in Florence, Italy, and at the Boijmans Van Beuningen Museum in Rotterdam, Netherlands.

== Works ==
- Hedwig Elisabeth (1673)
- Family Portrait (1680–1689)
- Children Playing Before a Hercules Group (1687)
- Shepherd and Shepherdess (1689)
- Flora with Putti Strewing Flowers (1696), Schloss Wilhelmshöhe, Kassel, Germany
- Diogenes (1699)
- Sarah Presenting Hagar to Abraham (1699)
- Maria Anna Luisa (1700)
- Portrait of Johann Wilhelm, Elector Palatinate (1700)
- Portrait of John Churchill Marlborough (12 December 1701)
- Adam and Eve (c. 1711), dedicated to Marie Joséphine of Savoy and Louis XVIII
- Homage to the Arts (1713)
- Mary with the Christ-child and John the Baptist (1715), mahogany, 46 x 34 cm, Gemäldegalerie Alte Meister, Dresden
- The Holy Family and Infant Saint John the Baptist (1715)
- The Judgement of Paris (1716)
- The Annunciation (1718), transferred from oak to canvas, 71 x 52 cm, Gemäldegalerie Alte Meister, Dresden
- Mucius Scaevola, pencil on paper. 29.4 × 20.6 cm. Herzog Anton Ulrich-Museum, Braunschweig (Brunswick)
- Noli me tangere (1719)
- Nymphes dasant (1720), also painted by his brother
- Perkeo, uncertainly painted this portrait, painted by Johann George Dathan
- Portrait of Simon Martin Haake
- Portrait of Mary II of England, also painted with Étienne-Jehandier Desrochers
- Portrait of Friedrich von Schomberg
- Portrait of William II of England, also painted with Étienne-Jehandier Desrochers
- The Visitation, ink, washed on paper, 29.4 x 20.6 cm. Herzog Anton Ulrich-Museum, Braunschweig (Brunswick)

== Gallery ==
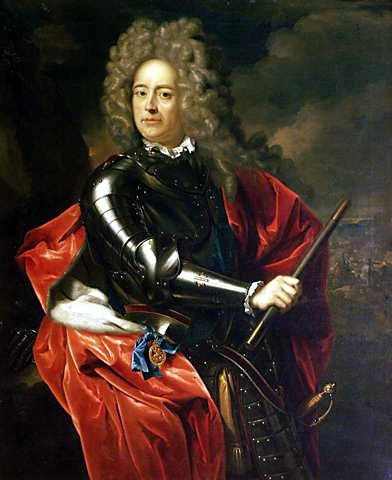
Portrait of John Churchill, 1st Duke of Marlborough (1650–1722) (1704, Uffizi)

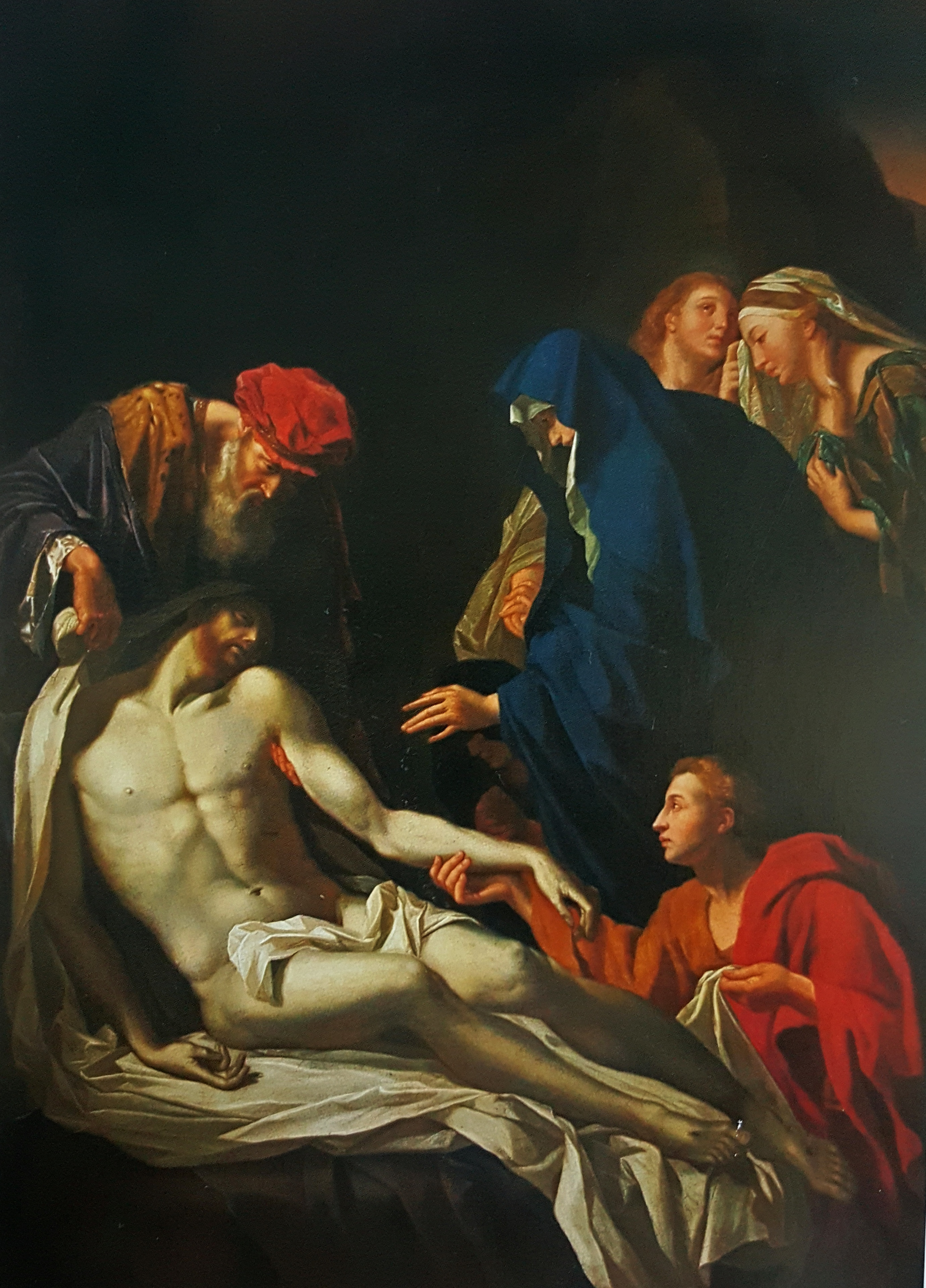
The Entombment (1703, National Museum, Wrocław)

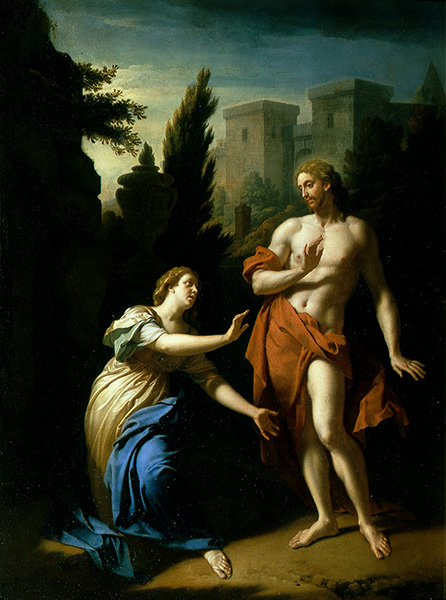
Noli me tangere (1719)

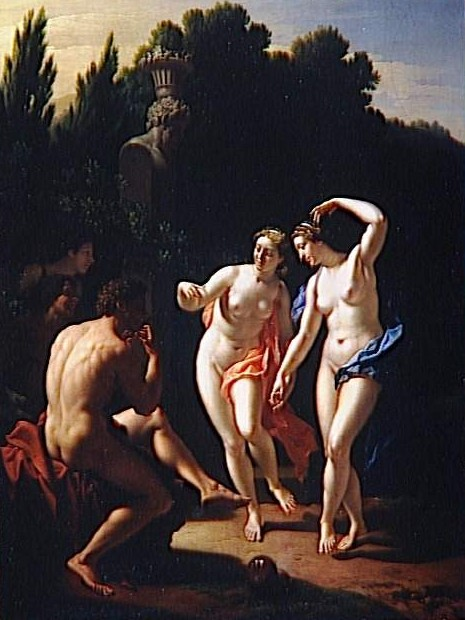
Nymphes dansant (1720), also painted by his brother, Musée du Louvre

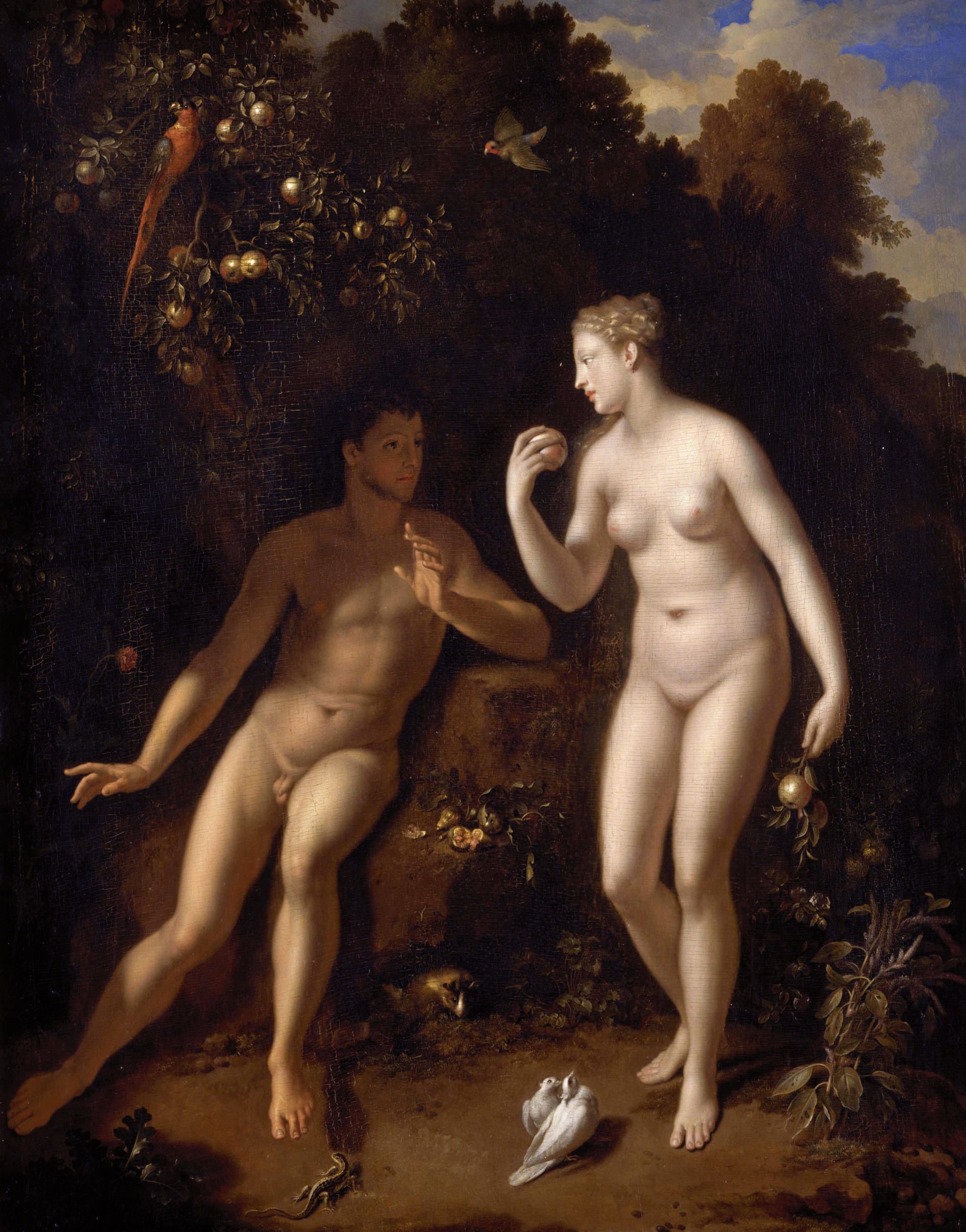
Adam and Eve (c. 1711, Musée du Louvre)

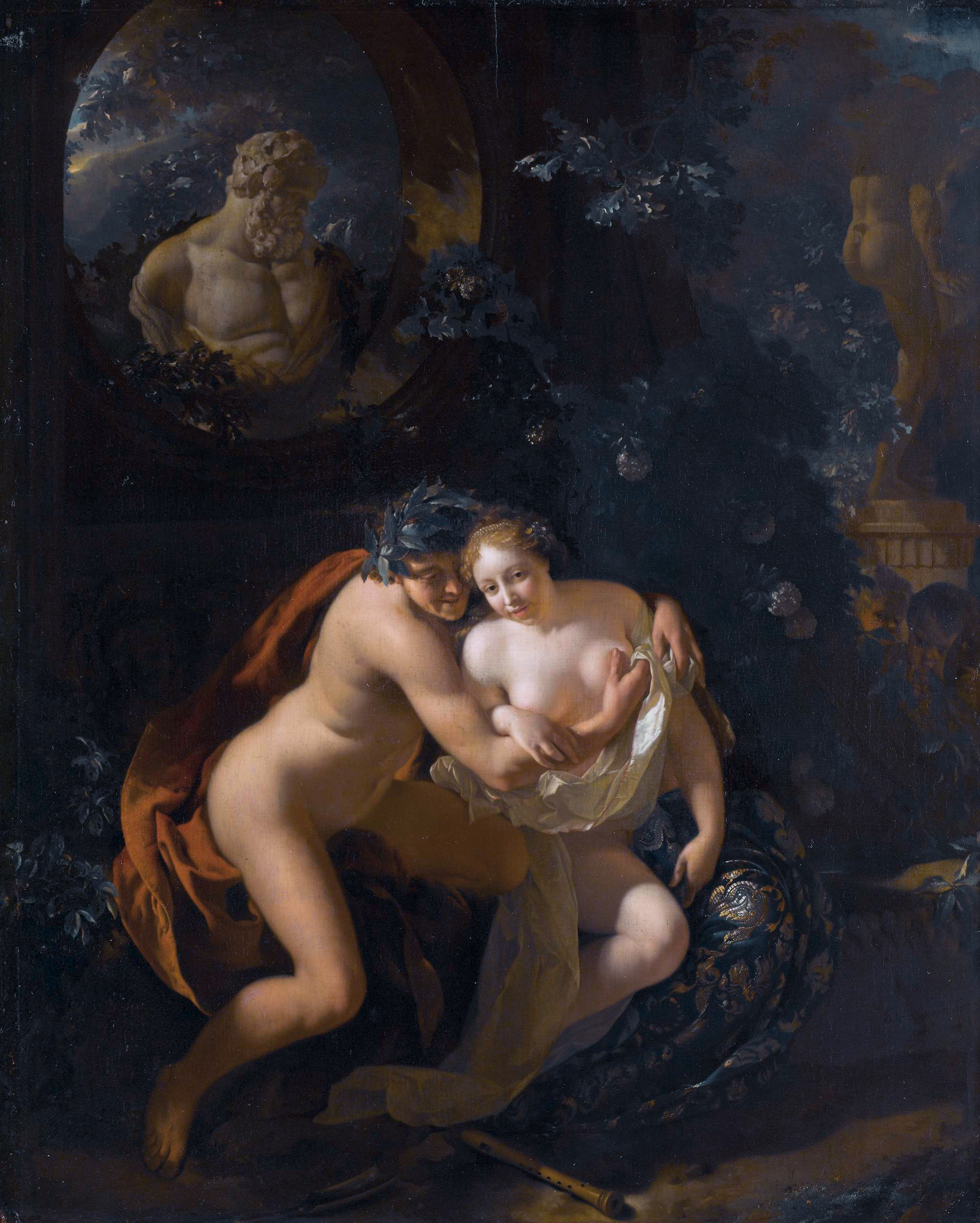
Paris and Oenone (1694, Rijksmuseum)

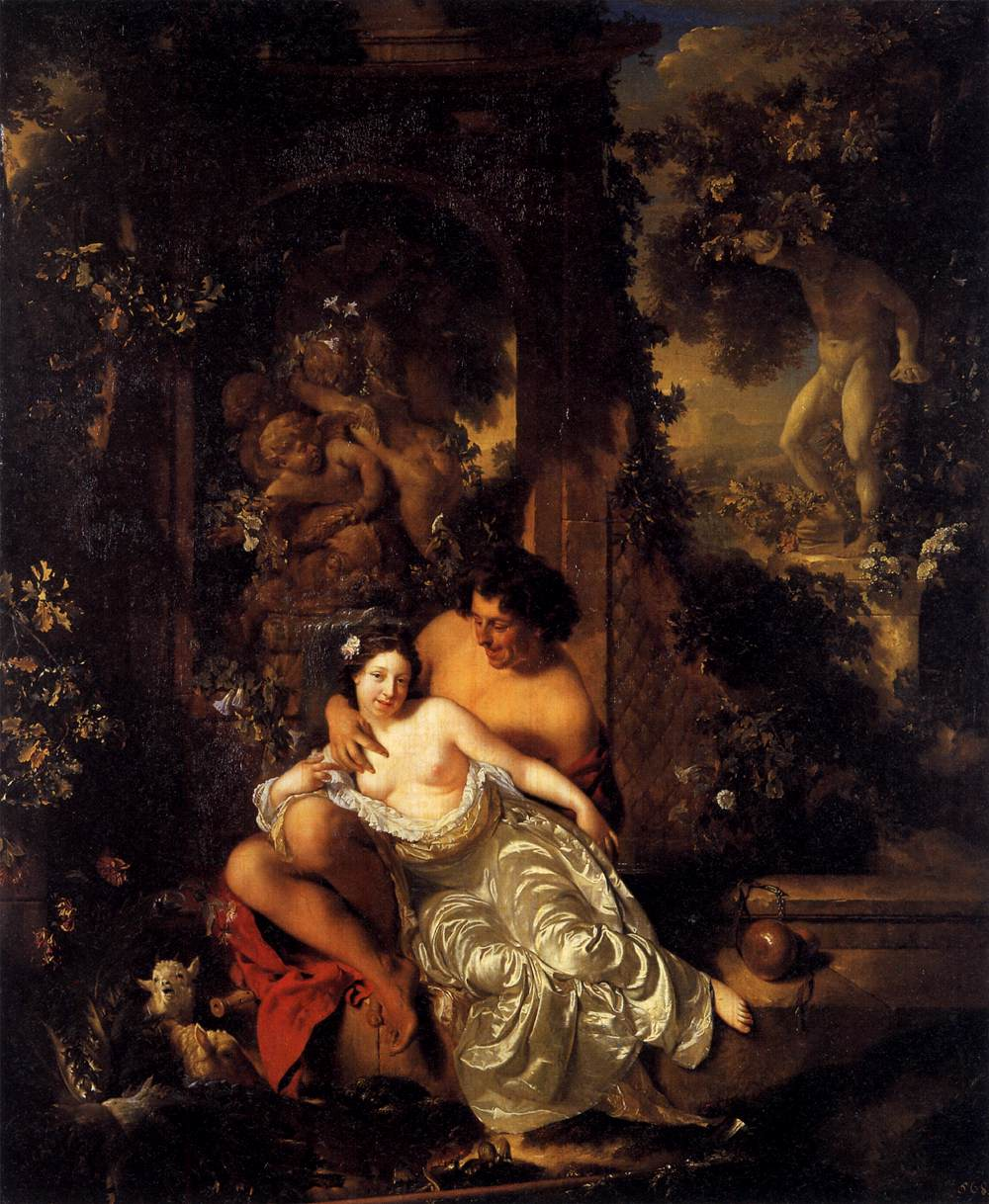
Shepherd and Shepherdess (1689)

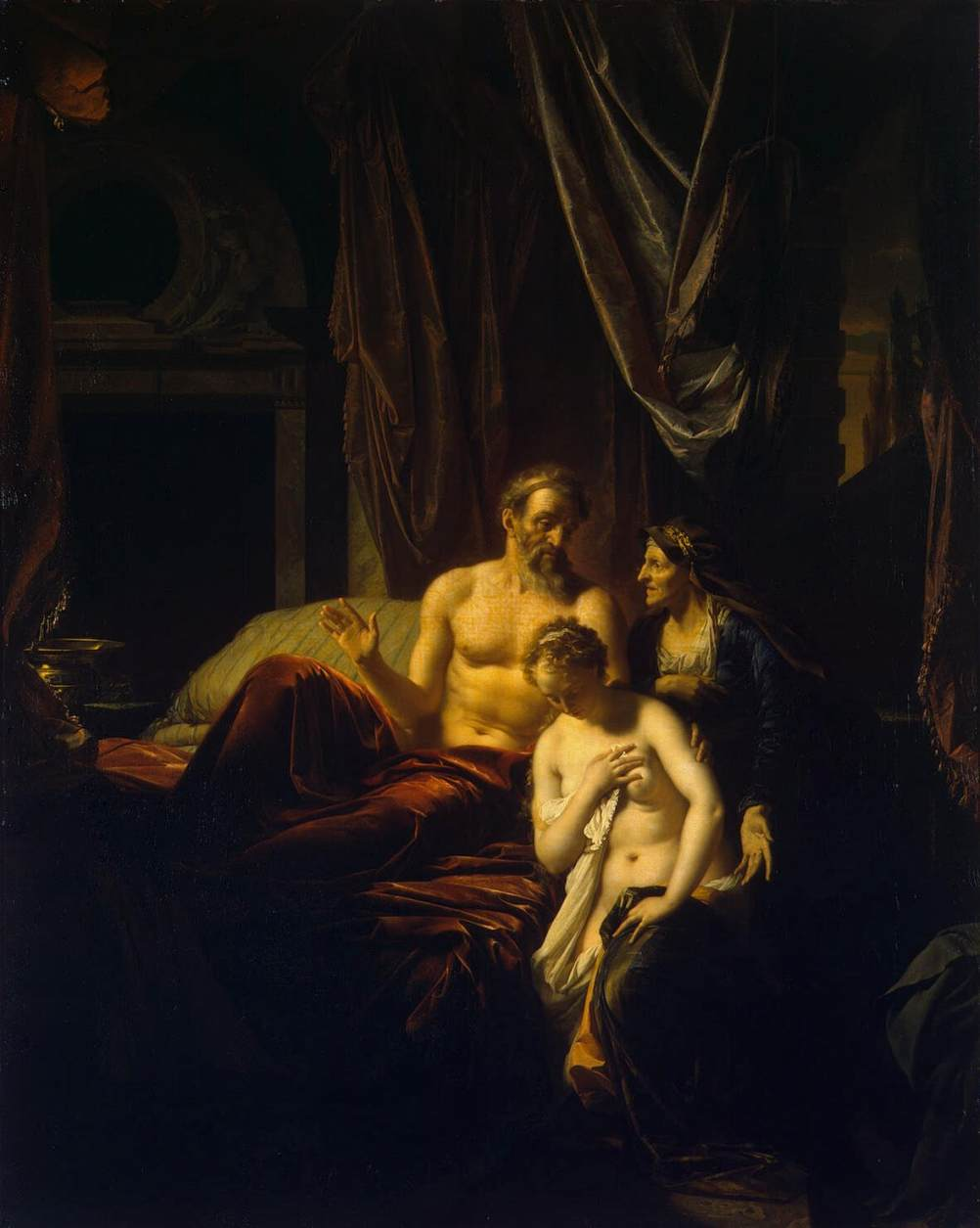
Sara brengt Hagar tot Abraham (Genesis 16:3) Sarah Bringing Hagar to Abraham, 1696

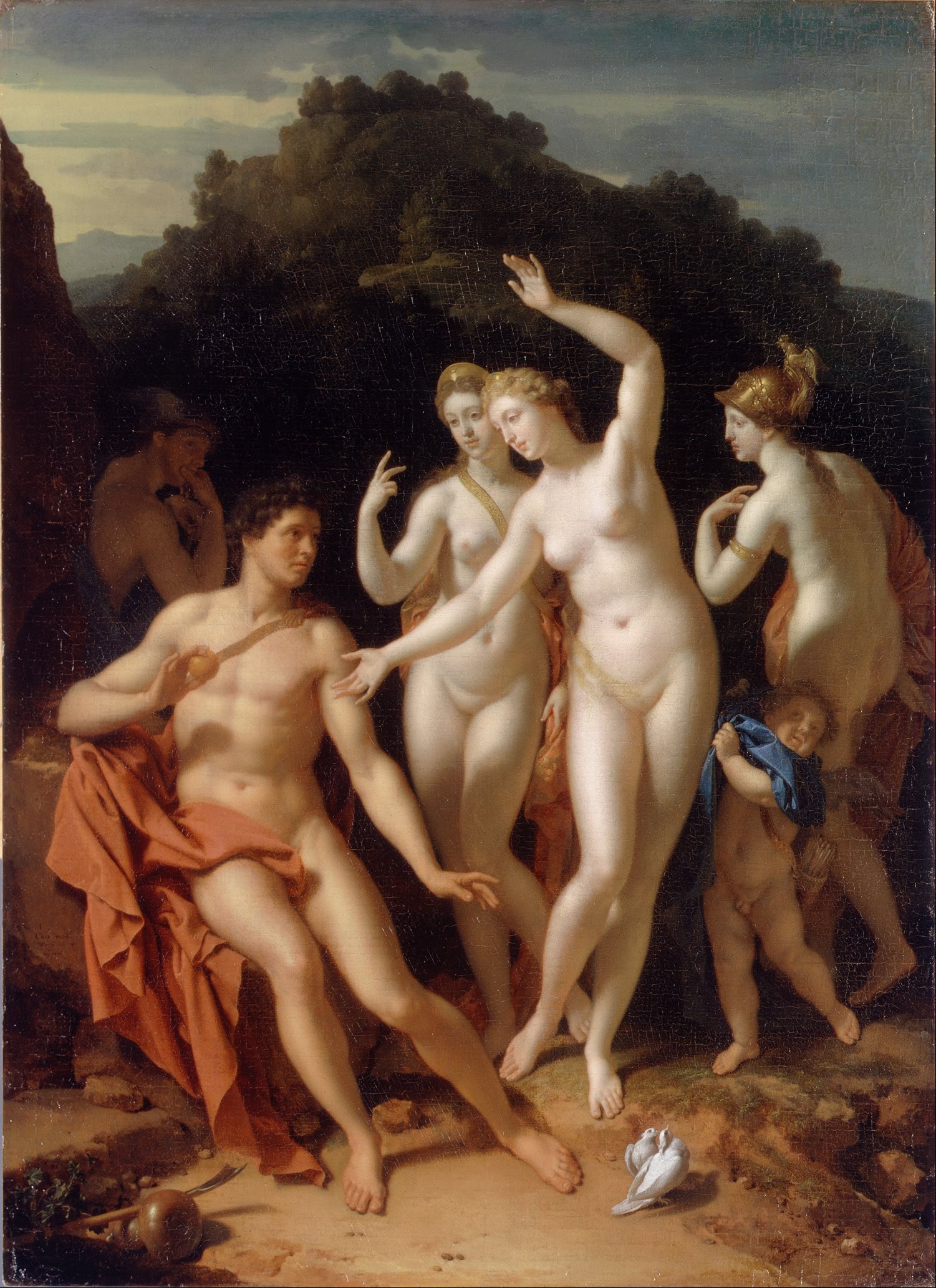
The Judgement of Paris (1716, Dulwich Picture Gallery)

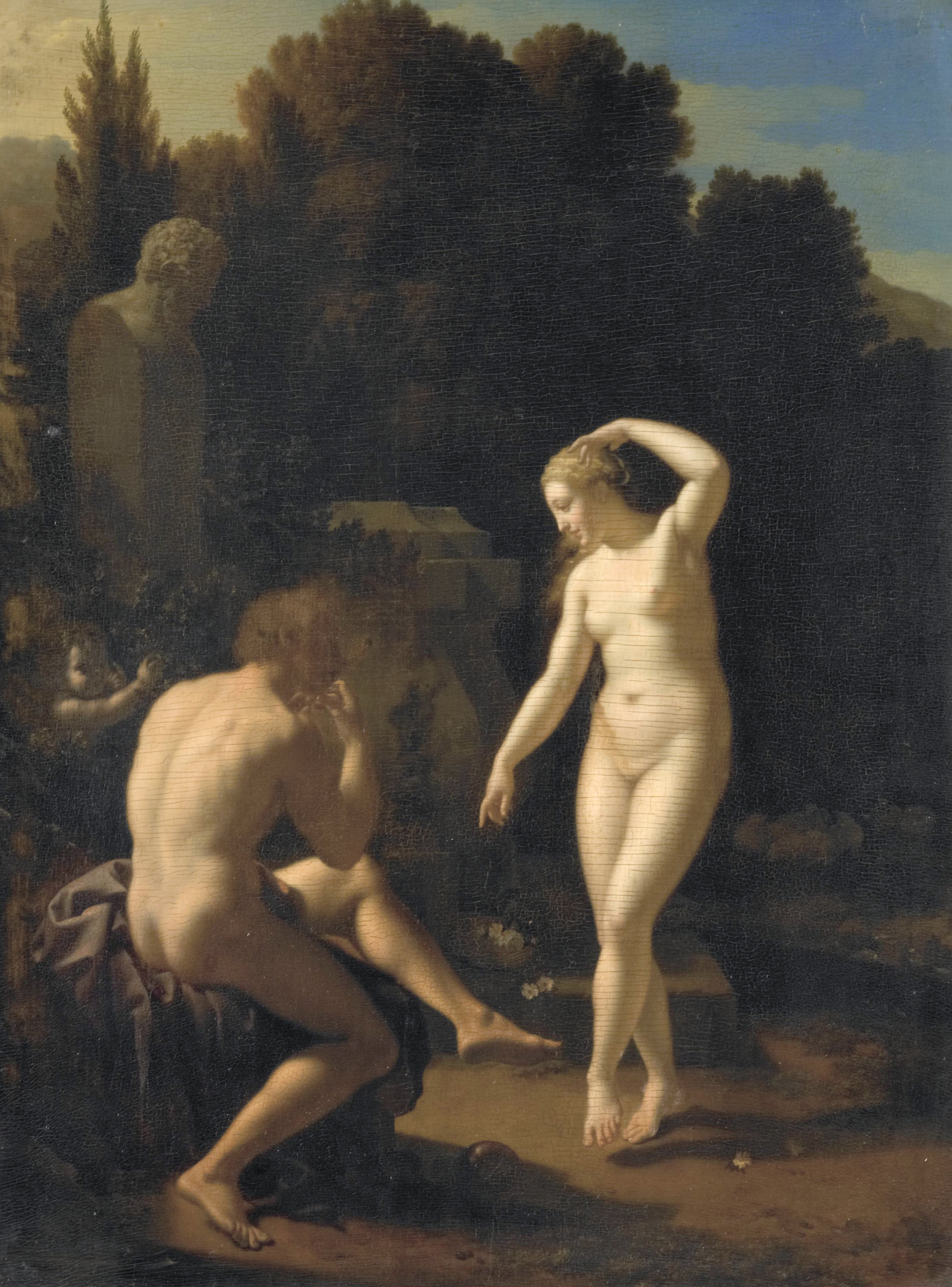
Een dansende nymf op het fluitspel van een herder (A nymph dancing before a shepherd playing a flute)

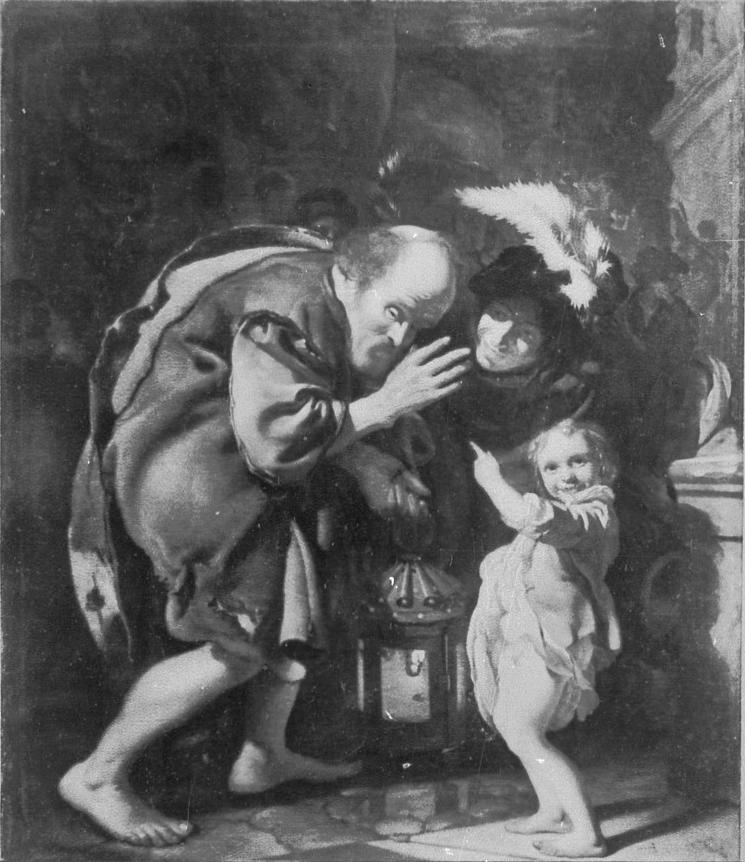
Diogenes mit der Laterne auf dem Markte (1699, Staatliche Kunstsammlungen Dresden)
