= Henry M. Leipziger =

English-born American educator and lecturer

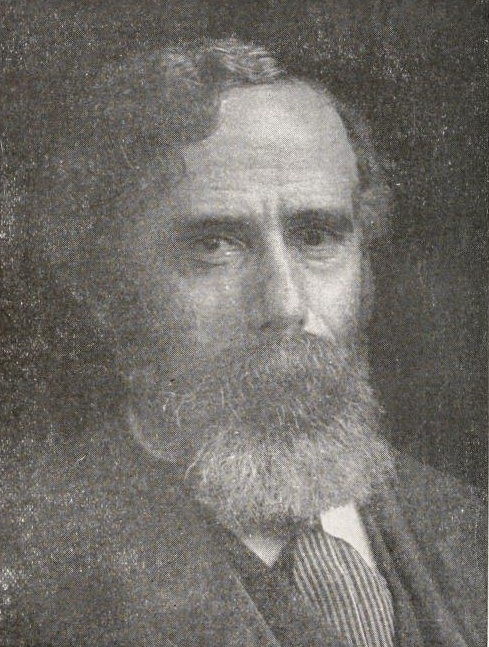

Henry Marcus Leipziger (December 29, 1854 – December 1, 1917, New York City) was an English-born American educator and lecturer. He founded the Hebrew Technical Institute in 1884; serving as that school's first director until 1891 when he became Assistant Superintendent of New York City Public Schools.

== Life and career ==
The son of Marcus and Martha Leipziger, Henry Marcus Leipziger was born in Manchester, England on December 29, 1854. At a young age he immigrated with his family to the United States and settled with them in New York City where he was educated at New York City Public Schools. He matriculated to the City College of New York where he graduated in 1873 with Bachelor of Science degree. He then pursued graduate studies at Columbia University where he received diplomas in first a Bachelor of Laws and then a Ph.D. in 1888. He later pursued further studies at Union College where he earned a Legum Doctor in 1906.

From 1873-1881 Leipziger worked as a public school teacher in New York City. In 1884 he founded the Hebrew Technical Institute in New York, and severed as its first director through 1891. After this he worked as the Assistant Superintendent of New York City Public Schools from 1891-1896, and concurrently worked for the New York City Board of Education as Supervisor of Lecturers from 1890 until his death in 1917. He also served as Chairman of the Library Committee of the Aguilar Free Library, and was elected to a term as vice president of the American Scenic and Historical Society.
