= Burndy =

American connector manufacturer

Burndy LLC
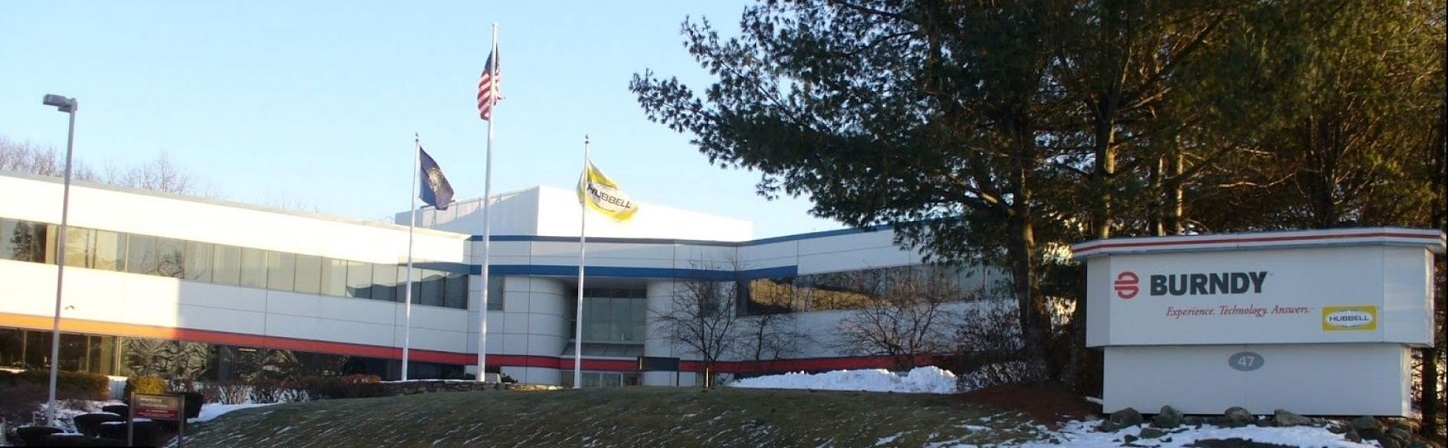
- Company type: subsidiary
- Industry: Electrical Utilities; Commercial, Residential & Industrial Tools; Telecommunication; Renewable Energies Market.
- Founded: 1924
- Founder: Bern Dibner
- Fate: Acquired by Hubbell Incorporated
- Successor: Hubbell Incorporated
- Headquarters: 47 E Industrial Park Drive, Manchester, US
- Revenue: ▲US$ 400 Million
- Number of employees: 3000+ (2018)

Burndy LLC is a manufacturer of connectors, fittings and tools for electrical utilities, commercial, industrial, and maintenance companies. The company, headquartered in Manchester, New Hampshire, has approximately 3000+ employees and operates three manufacturing facilities in the northeastern United States, as well as one in Brazil, and another in Mexico.

Burndy manufactures connectors for splicing, tapping, terminating, conducting or grounding, and provides certification and testing of tool and connector products to the following standards: ANCE, ANSI, SATM, CSA, IEC, IEEE, MILITARY, NEMA, NUPIC, SLMA, SAE, UL.

== History ==
BURNDY founder Bern Dibner

The company was founded in 1924 as Burndy Engineering Company by engineer, science historian, and civic leader Bern Dibner.The corporate name, Burndy, was derived from a contraction of Dr. Dibner’s first name and last initial.

While employed as an engineer unifying the electrical system in Cuba, Dr. Dibner identified the urgent need for improved methods for connecting electrical conductors and joining power system substations. He proceeded to design a universal connector, requiring neither soldering nor welding – which enabled a unified grid. He patented and fabricated his design, then formed his company with an investment of just $5,000. Building on a technical foundation of 24 patents granted to him for connector design, he guided the growth of Burndy until his retirement as chairman in 1972.

In 1956, the Burndy Corporation went public, and later was bought by the French corporation Framatome Connectors International (FCI) in 1988. In 2009, Burndy was acquired and became a subsidiary of Hubbell (NYSE: HUBA, HUBB).

In Europe, the former Burndy Europe, FCI's Electrical Power Interconnect Division is now part of the Sicame Group and known as SBI Connectors Espana.

Burndy today is a global organization that manufactures of electrical connectors for the commercial/industrial, utility, renewable energies, telecommunications, and OEM markets.

In addition to his association with the company he founded, Bern Dibner is frequently identified with two of the world’s leading collections of source material in the history of science: the Burndy Library at the Huntington Library in San Marino, California; and the Dibner Library of the History of Science and Technology at the Smithsonian Institution in Washington, DC.

Dr. Dibner’s son, David Dibner, had a more than 30-year career at the Burndy Corporation, and served as chairman prior to his death in 2005.

== Awards and recognition ==
Burndy received the "TED Best of the Best" 2009 Events award for hosting a Dibner Hall reception along with an associated reprint of the 1929 BURNDY Bus catalog. The award recognized the best electrical marketing campaigns fielded in 2008, for which more than 300 entries were submitted. An exhibit at Dibner Hall, located at the Huntington Library in San Marino (California) is called Beautiful Science: Ideas that Changed the World, and highlights four areas of exploration: astronomy, natural history, medicine, and light.

In 2008, BURNDY won awards as supplier of the year from WESCO International, Inc. and Border States Industries, Inc. and received a Graybar Electric Company, Inc. award for innovation.

== See also ==
- Dibner Institute for the History of Science and Technology
- Electrical Connector
