= Leila Clark =

American entomologist and librarian (1887–1964)

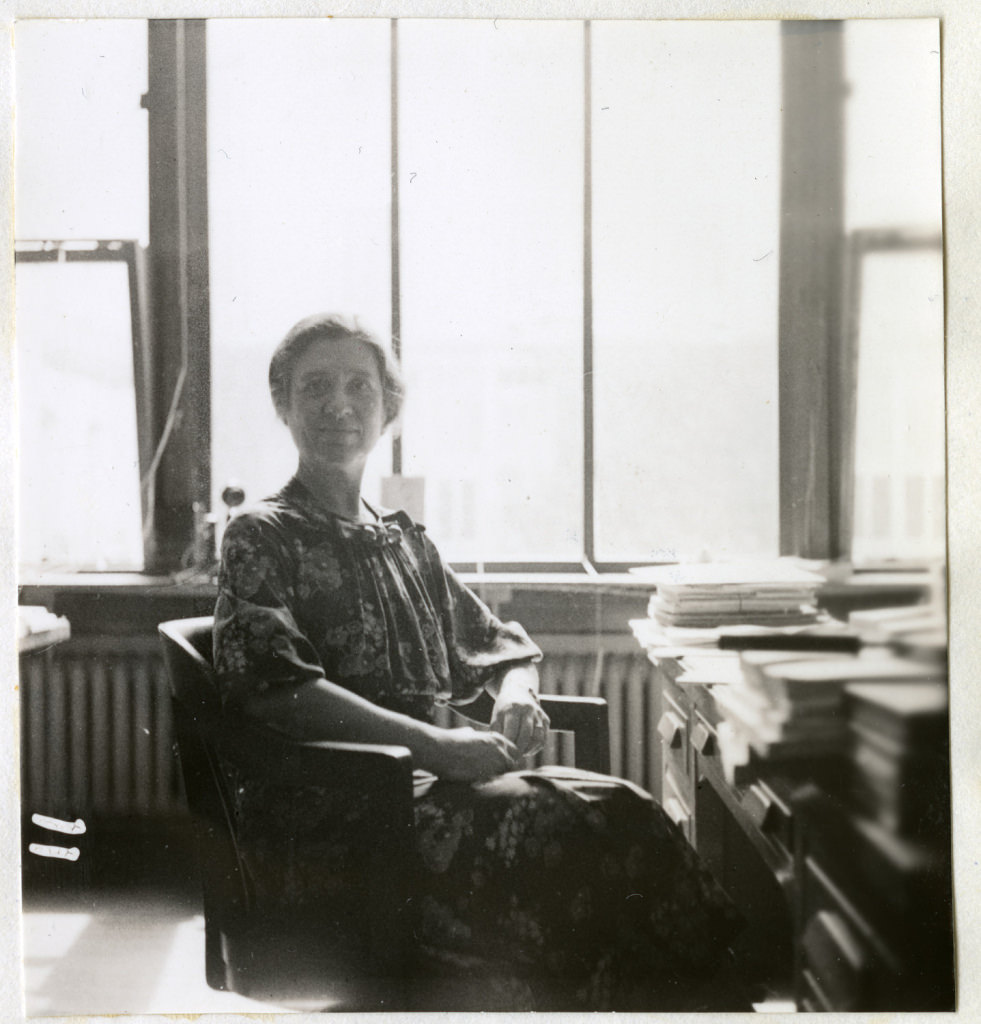
- Occupations: librarian, entomologist

Leila Gay Forbes Clark (1887-1964) was an entomologist and librarian at the Smithsonian Institution. She was the second woman to direct the Smithsonian's library. Prior to her work at the Smithsonian, she worked as a librarian at Wellesley College, Randolph-Macon Woman's College, and the US Department of Agriculture. She joined the Smithsonian in 1929 and spent the rest of her career there becoming director in 1942. During her tenure she oversaw the merger of the main Smithsonian Library with the U.S. National Museum Library which resulted in the centralized Smithsonian Libraries system currently in place.

She and her husband went on frequent butterfly expeditions and coauthored The Butterflies of Virginia in 1951. A new form of golden banded-skipper, Autochton cellus leilae, was named for her by her husband.

== Personal life ==
Clark was born in Canton, New York to Henry Prentiss Forbes and Harriet E. Wood. She received a B.S. from Saint Lawrence University in 1908. She married Austin Hobart Clark on September 23, 1933.
