= Tamar Evangelestia-Dougherty =

American librarian and administrator

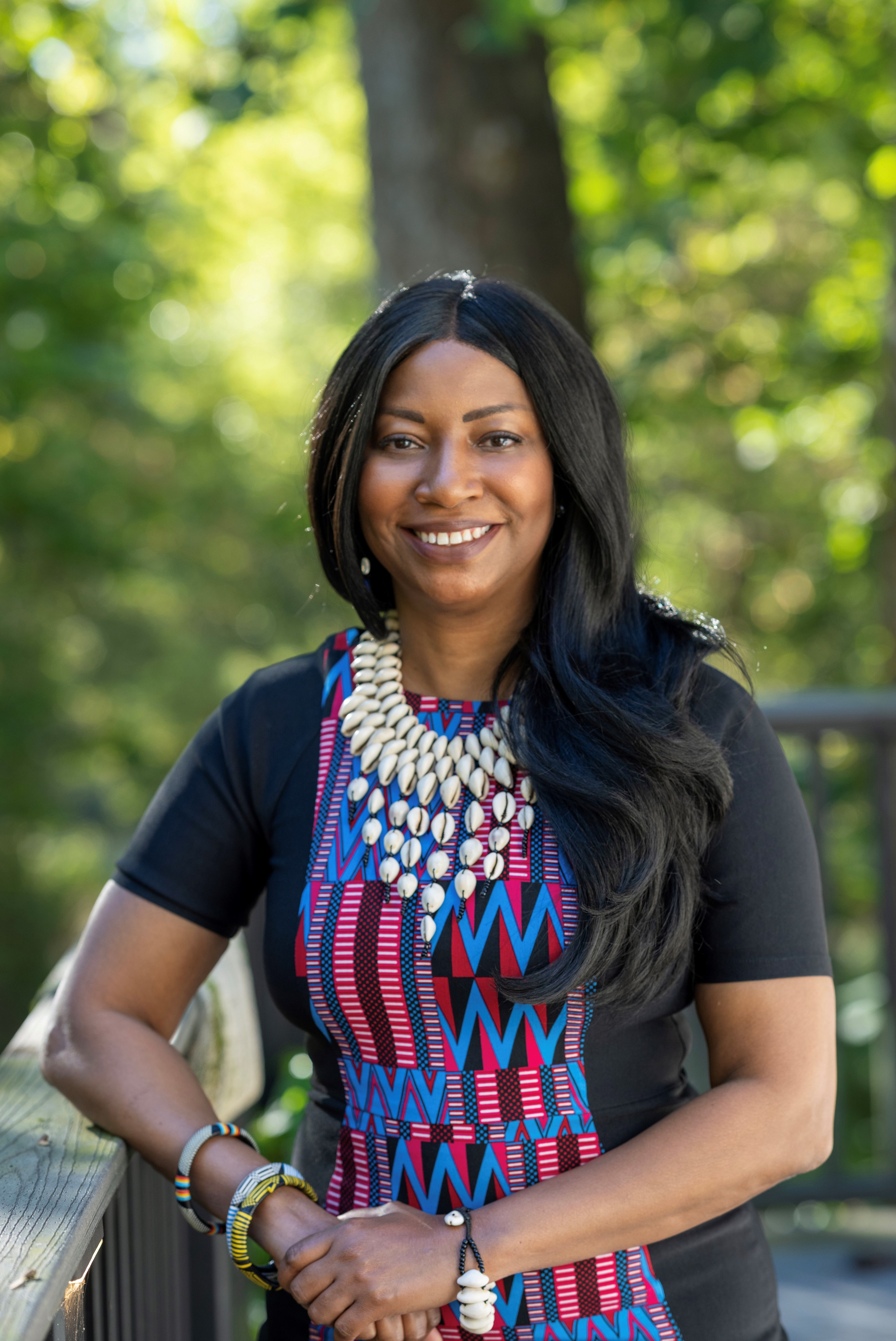
- Born: Chicago, Illinois, United States
- Education: University of Houston; Simmons College
- Occupations: Director of the Smithsonian Libraries and Archives (2021–2024); Deputy Commissioner City of Chicago, Department of Cultural Affairs and Events (2024–present)

Tamar Evangelestia-Dougherty is an American librarian and cultural heritage administrator. An archives and special collections expert, Evangelestia-Dougherty was the executive director of the Chicago-based Black Metropolis Research Consortium from 2011 to 2013 and the director of collections and services at the Schomburg Center for Research in Black Culture from 2013 to 2015. From 2021 to 2024, she was the first director of the Smithsonian Libraries and Archives, the world's largest museum library system. She currently serves as Deputy Commissioner of Visual Arts for the City of Chicago.

== Early life and education ==
Tamar Evangelestia-Dougherty was raised on the West Side of Chicago by a single mother, Rochelle Weaver. The Chicago Public Library served as a refuge during her youth, providing comfort and knowledge. She attended Von Steuben Metropolitan High School, graduating in 1988.

Evangelestia-Dougherty attended the University of Houston, graduating with a bachelor's degree in political science in 1996. She worked in the law libraries of DePaul University College of Law and South Texas College of Law Houston as an undergraduate. She was inspired by her experience researching for a high school history fair and by her supervisors, law librarian Tobin Sparling and Chicago Public Library senior archivist Beverly Cook to attend library school. Evangelestia-Dougherty attended Simmons College for her master's degree, specializing in rare books, archives, and preservation management and studying under archivist Jeannette Bastian. She earned her Master of Library Science degree in 2003. While studying at Simmons, she worked as an archival fellow at the John F. Kennedy Presidential Library and at the Yale University Library's Manuscripts and Archives division.

She is also a 2004 graduate of the Minnesota Institute for Early Career Librarians from Traditionally Underrepresented Groups.

== Career ==
Evangelestia-Dougherty began her professional career with a series of archival assistant positions, including at Princeton University Library, the Whitney Museum of American Art, and the Harvard University Herbaria. In 2003 she became the David N. Dinkins Archivist at the Columbia University Libraries, and from 2004 to 2007 worked as the Herbert H. Lehman Curator at Columbia.

In 2007 she began working as the consulting archivist for the Black Metropolis Research Consortium (BMRC), a collaborative effort between twelve libraries and museums in Chicago dedicated to Black history, founded by Danielle Allen and hosted at the University of Chicago. She served as the executive director of the organization from 2011 to 2013, leading initiatives and building collaborative partnerships to discover and preserve hidden collections related to the African American diaspora. Working directly with individuals and Black and LGBTQ nonprofit historical organizations in the Chicago area community, Evangelestia-Dougherty was an active figure in the community archives movement. Through programming, education, and fundraising such as the BMRC Andrew W. Mellon Consortial Initiative in which she first conceptualized the "Second Space Initiative" and the BMRC CLIR Color Curtain Processing Project, she highlighted Black collections in Chicago, making them more accessible to the public. Her work at the Black Metropolis Research Consortium contributed to the organization earning the Distinguished Service Award from the Society of American Archivists in 2013.

She took on the role of director of collections and services at New York Public Library's Schomburg Center for Research in Black Culture in 2013, providing leadership for collection and programming of five curatorial divisions, serving in that role until 2015.

She joined Cornell University Library in 2019 as an associate university librarian. In that role she created Cornell Rare and Distinctive Collections (RAD), a series of initiatives and programs designed to create a research hub for greater use of the university's unique collections.

In October 2021 Evangelestia-Dougherty was announced as the new director of Smithsonian Libraries and Archives, the first director to oversee the newly merged libraries and archives. The Smithsonian Libraries and Archives comprises 21 branch libraries serving the various Smithsonian Institution museums, with 3 million volumes, 44,000 cubic feet of archival materials, and 137 staff members. She stepped down from the role, effective October 1, 2024, after serving since December 6, 2021.

In December 2024, Clinée Hedspeth announced that Evangelestia-Dougherty would become Chicago’s Deputy Commissioner for Visual Arts in the city's Department of Cultural Affairs and Special Events.

She has taught in several organizations, including teaching as an adjunct professor at Dominican University from 2007 to 2013 and teaching a course titled "Developing and Administering Ethnic and Cultural Heritage Collections" at the California Rare Book School, where she also serves on the advisory committee. She was the 2021–2022 Director at Large for Digital Scriptorium, a consortium of American libraries and museums providing access to collections of pre-modern manuscripts, and served on the board of trustees of the American Printing History Association from 2021 to 2024.

She is an advocate for the use of primary source literacy in K-12 education and has worked to promote feminist bibliographies. Evangelestia-Dougherty's work administering African American collections and around the concept of "second space" (community-based organizations and individuals with collections focused on non-traditional subject matter and formats pertaining to African Americans) has inspired other archivists working with Black collections.

== Personal interests ==
Evangelestia-Dougherty is a Food Allergy Awareness Advocate through Food Allergy Research & Education and has contributed to Allergic Living magazine.
