= Von Steuben Metropolitan High School =

Friedrich Wilhelm von Steuben Metropolitan Science High School
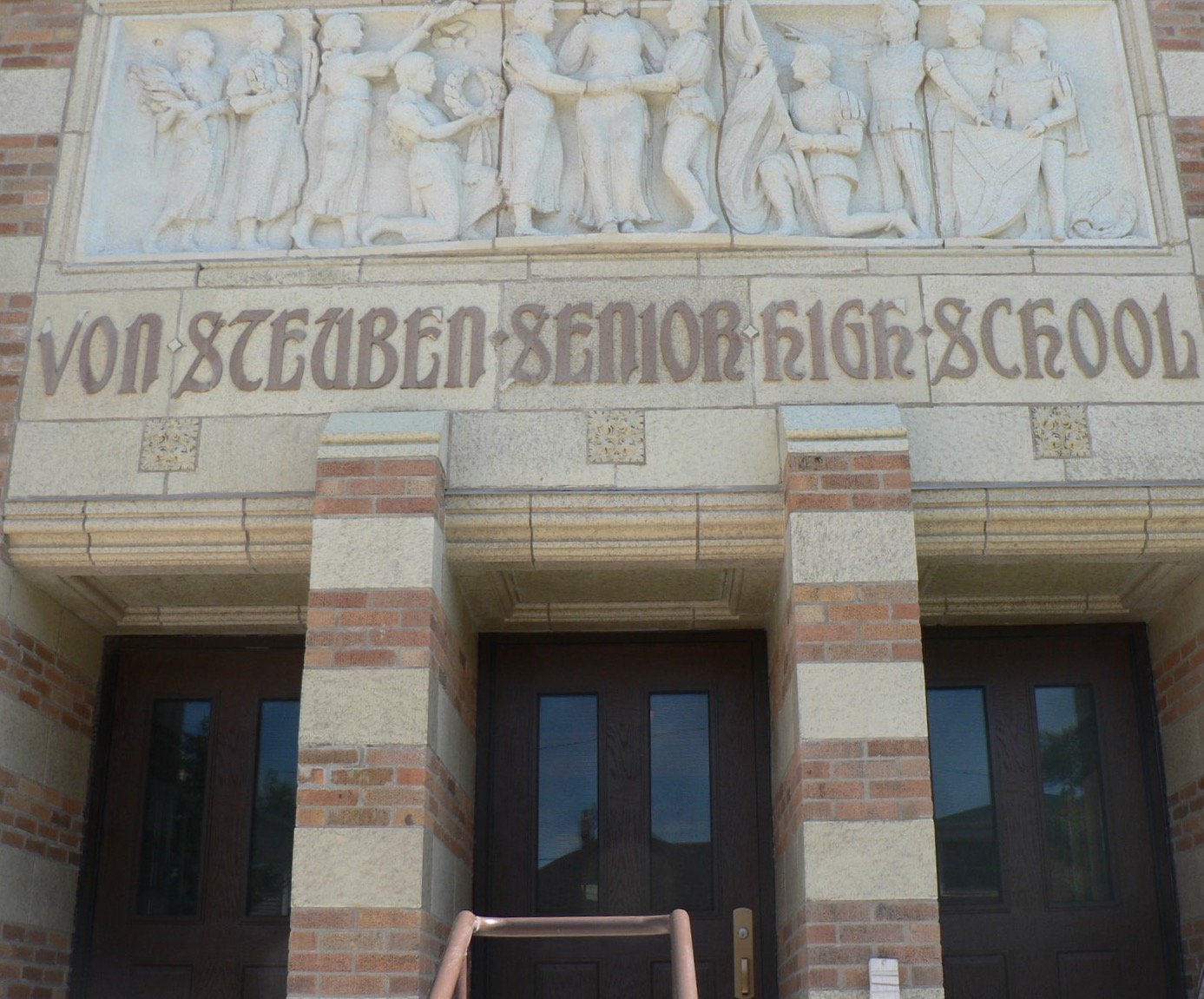

Location
- 5039 N. Kimball Avenue; Chicago, Illinois 60625; United States; 41.9732°N 87.7132°W

Information
- School type: Public Secondary
- Motto: "Together, we are Von strong."
- Opened: 1930; 96 years ago
- School district: Chicago Public Schools
- Principal: Jennifer Sutton
- Grades: 9–12
- Gender: Coed
- Enrollment: 1,648 (2015–16)
- Campus type: Urban
- Colors: Red; Black
- Song: Let’s wave on high the banner of our school, Let’s cheer to make the rafters ring. Ever be faithful to her golden rule, And of her glories we will carry on, All sons and daughters brave and true. In friendships linking arms, In mem’ries of her charms. Von Steuben High School Here’s to you. Written by Carol Herron, Class of 1938; Music by Ray Turner, Class of 1936
- Athletics conference: Chicago Public League
- Mascot: Panther
- Team name: Panthers
- Accreditation: North Central Association of Colleges and Schools
- Newspaper: The Panther Press
- Yearbook: Visions
- Website: vonsteuben.org

Von Steuben Metropolitan High School (also known as Friedrich Wilhelm von Steuben Metropolitan Science Center High School) is a public four-year high school that provides magnet college prep program with regular and honors courses and scholars program offering only honors and Advanced Placement classes, located on the border of the North Park and Albany Park neighborhoods on the north side of Chicago, Illinois, United States. Opened in 1930, Von Steuben is operated by the Chicago Public Schools district and is named for military officer Friedrich Wilhelm von Steuben.

== Achievements ==
Von Steuben was named an Outstanding American High School by U.S. News & World Report in 1999 and mentioned in Newsweek's America's Best High Schools list in 2003. According to the U.S. News & World Report in 2012, Von Steuben ranks at #49 at the state level and #1273 at the national level.

== Athletics ==
Von Steuben competes in the Chicago Public League (CPL) and is a member of the Illinois High School Association (IHSA). Von Steuben sport teams are nicknamed Panthers. In the 2002–03 season, The boys’ sophomore basketball team won the Chicago Class AA city title. In 2004–05 and 2005–06, The boys' varsity water polo team won the city title. In the 2011–12 season, the boys' sophomore volleyball team were named city champions. In the 2014–2015 season the boys' freshman, JV, and varsity teams all were named city champions. In the 2022 season the Boys' Varsity Baseball team won their Conference. Also in 2022 the Boys Varsity Basketball team won the Consolation City Playoffs.

=== Fall ===
- Boys' Soccer
- Girls' Swimming
- Girls' Volleyball
- Girls' Tennis
- Boys' and Girls' Cross-Country
- Boys' and Girls' Golf
- Boys' Football

=== Winter ===
- Boys' NBAs and Girls' Basketball
- Girls' Bowling
- Boys' Swimming
- Wrestling
- Cheerleading
- Boys' and Girls' Indoor Track

=== Spring ===
- Boys' Baseball
- Girls' Softball
- Boys' and Girls' Soccer
- Boys' Tennis
- Boys' Volleyball
- Boys' and Girls' Volleyball
- Boys' and Girls' Track and Field
- Boys' and Girls' Water Polo

== Notable alumni ==
- Charlene Barshefsky – former United States Trade Representative
- Neil Bluhm - American billionaire real estate and casino magnate
- Rosalyn Bryant – 1976 Olympic silver medalist in the 4x400 meter relay
- Howie Carl – basketball player, played for Ray Meyer at DePaul University and played pro basketball for the NBA's Chicago Packers
- Tamar Evangelestia-Dougherty – director of the Smithsonian Libraries and Archives
- Michael Fakuade - basketball player who played overseas
- Albert Goldbarth – poet and author
- Mike Nussbaum – actor and director
- Ash-har Quraishi – broadcast journalist; formerly CNN's bureau chief in Islamabad
- Marv Rotblatt – former MLB player (Chicago White Sox)
- Lynn Sweet – Chicago Sun-Times Washington DC bureau chief
- Israel Sanchez - former MLB player (Kansas City Royals)
