= Smithsonian Libraries and Archives =

System of libraries at the Smithsonian Institution, United States

- Location: Washington, DC; New York City, NY; Suitland and Edgewater, MD; Republic of Panama
- Established: First library established 1846; Modern Smithsonian library system established 1968
- Branches: 21

Collection
- Size: 3 million volumes

Other information
- Director: Tricia Edwards
- Website: library.si.edu

Smithsonian Libraries and Archives is an institutional archives and library system comprising 21 branch libraries serving the various Smithsonian Institution museums and research centers. The Libraries and Archives serve Smithsonian Institution staff as well as the scholarly community and general public with information and reference support. Its collections number nearly 3 million volumes including 50,000 rare books and manuscripts.

The Libraries' collections focus primarily on science, art, history, culture, and museology. The archives include materials documenting the history of the 19 museums and galleries, the National Zoological Park, 9 research facilities, and the people of the Smithsonian. The Smithsonian Libraries and Archives is dedicated to advancing scientific and cultural understanding as well as preserving American heritage. The organization's Book Conservation Lab and other preservation efforts work to ensure long-term access to library and archival resources. Additional efforts include educational programs for learners of all ages, hosting internships and fellowships, and participating in collaborative projects such as the Biodiversity Heritage Library and the Digital Public Library of America.

Formerly two separate units within the Smithsonian, the Smithsonian Libraries and Smithsonian Institution Archives merged in 2020.

== Mission ==
The Smithsonian Libraries promotes new ideas through knowledge sharing. We play a dynamic role in advancing scientific and cultural understanding and in preserving America's heritage. Our expert staff and extensive collections are a crucial resource for research and education communities at the Smithsonian, within the United States, and around the world.

== History of the Smithsonian Libraries ==
The original library was founded by an Act of Congress on August 10, 1846, when the Smithsonian Institution was named a trust instrumentality of the United States. The Act created a Board of Regents for the Institution, and called for a building to house a museum with geological and mineralogical cabinets, a chemical laboratory, a gallery of art, lecture rooms, and a library.

The Smithsonian Libraries system as it exists today was not established until 1968, when Secretary S. Dillon Ripley realized that the existing library organization was greatly in need of an overhaul. He created a new position, Director of the Smithsonian Institution Libraries, and hired Russell Shank to fill the role. Shank reorganized the library staff and procedures, and created a modern, unified system with central services and a union catalog. By 1977, when Shank left, the quality and research value of the scientific collections were recognized nationally, and SIL was invited to join the Association of Research Libraries. SIL was granted a seat on the executive board of the Federal Libraries and Information Centers Coordinating Committee.

The late 1970s and 1980s also saw a growth in the number of Smithsonian Libraries branches, brought about by a range of donations to the Institution. In 1976, ten thousand rare scientific books and manuscripts were gifted to the Smithsonian by the Burndy Library, prompting the creation of the Dibner Library of the History of Science and Technology under the Smithsonian umbrella. Several years later, large donations of artifact collections led to the formation of new museums for subjects such as African art, American Indian culture and postal history and a new library branch was subsequently formed for each of these as well.

The 1990s introduced an expansion of the Libraries' focus to improve their ability to reach and educate the general public. The introduction of electronic and Internet technology played a large role in spurring this new outreach endeavor. In 1999, under the leadership of director Robert Maloy, Smithsonian Libraries staff completed a fourteen-year long effort to create a public access online catalog, with 97 percent of their then-holdings gaining digital records. The Smithsonian Research Information System (SIRIS) was introduced in the 2000s, providing the capability to search records of text, images, video and sound files from across the Smithsonian Institution.

In March 2013, the Smithsonian Institution Libraries formally changed its name to Smithsonian Libraries "to simplify and strengthen the Libraries as part of an overall rebranding in the modern era". The Smithsonian Libraries and Smithsonian Institution Archives merged in December 2020 and the organization changed its name to the Smithsonian Libraries and Archives.

=== Early leadership (1846–1968) ===
- Charles Coffin Jewett (1847–1855), Assistant Secretary acting as Librarian
- Jane Turner (1855–1887), first female employee of the Smithsonian, assigned as keeper of accession records for books after Jewett's dismissal
- Theodore Gill (1866 – ?), Assistant to the National Library (Library of Congress)

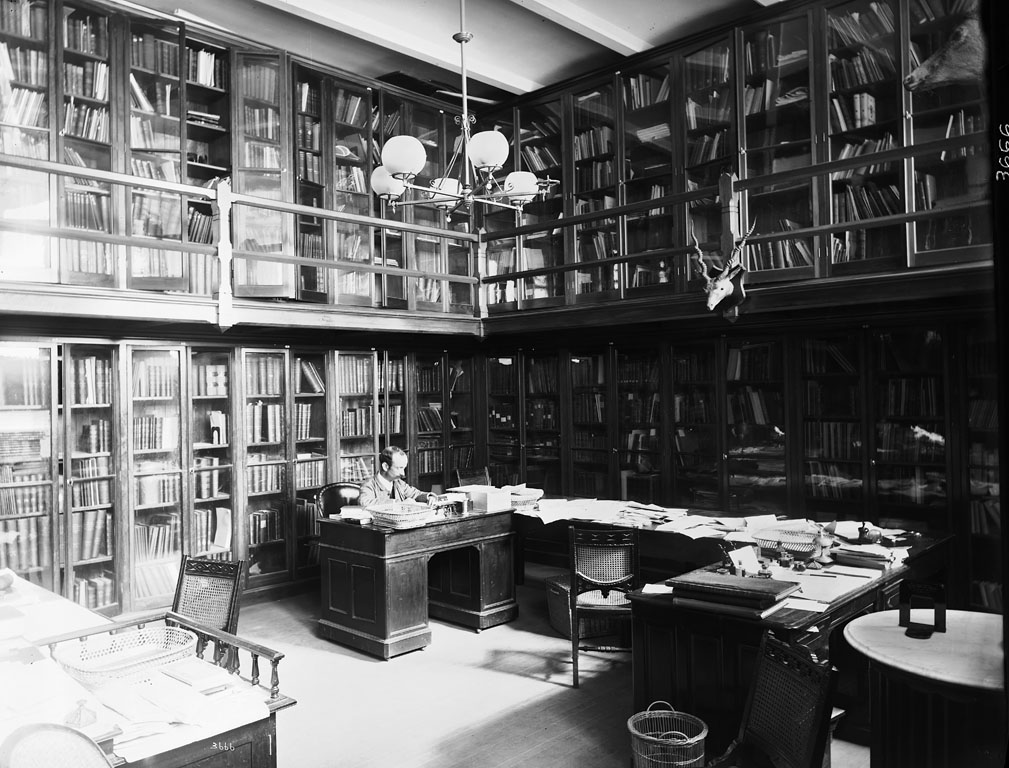
John Murdoch, Librarian of the Smithsonian Institution (1887–1892), sitting at a desk in the Jewett Room, United States National Museum Building (now known as the Arts & Industries Building).

- John Murdoch (1887–1892), librarian
- Cyrus B. Adler (1892–1905), Assistant Secretary in Charge of Library and Exchanges
- Frederick W. True (1911–1914), Assistant Secretary in Charge of Library and Exchanges
- Paul Brockett (1914–1925), Assistant Librarian
- William L. Corbin (1924–1942), librarian
- Leila F. Clark (1942–1957), librarian, first to hold a library degree
- Ruth E. Blanchard (1957–1964), Librarian
- Mary A. Huffer (1964–1967), Acting Librarian

=== Directors ===
- Russell Shank (1968–1977)
- Robert Maloy (1979–1987)
- Vija Karklins (acting director, 1987–1989)
- Barbara J. Smith (1989–1997)
- Nancy E. Gwinn (1997–January 4, 2020)
- Scott Miller (Interim Director, January 2020–December 2021)
- Tamar Evangelestia-Dougherty (December 2021–September 2024), inaugural director of the newly merged Smithsonian Libraries and Archives
- Liza Kirwin (Interim Director, October 2024–September 2025)
- Tricia Edwards (Interim Director, September 2025-April 2026; Director, April 2026 to present)

== History of the Smithsonian Archives ==
In 1891, William Jones Rhees, Chief Clerk of the Smithsonian Institution, became Keeper of the Archives. He served until 1907. Current records and historical files were maintained by Office of the Secretary's administrative staff through the middle of the 20th century. John F. Jameson III became Archivist in 1958. His successor, John DeGurse Jr., served from 1960 to 1964.

Beginning in 1965, Smithsonian Archivist Samuel T. Suratt was charged with "development of the Archives as a facility for historical research in American Science by making the Archives' resources more readily accessible to historians through better identification, preservation, and cataloging of Smithsonian documents." The Archives were physically relocated to the Smithsonian Castle, and received separate line-item funding.

Nathan Reingold, the editor of the Joseph Henry Papers Project, served as Acting Archivist from 1969 to 1970. In January 1970, Richard H. Lytle began a tenure as Archivist which included the 1973 establishment of an oral history program, and the 1976 relocation of the Archives to the Arts and Industries Building. Most of the Smithsonian museums increased acquisitions and conducted surveys during this period; new guides were issued 1971 and 1978. In 1981, William A. Deiss became Acting Archivist, upon Lytle's departure to head up the Smithsonian's computer services. 1983 saw yet another new guide to the expanding repositories, and the appointment of William W. Moss as Director.

By fiscal year 1988, the stacks in the Arts and Industry Building had filled up, and about 5,000 cubic feet of records were sent to leased warehouses at Fullerton Industrial Park, South Springfield, Virginia. New developments included the Smithsonian Archives and Special Collections Council, The Smithsonian Videohistory Program, which collected interviews focused on American science starting in 1987, and an "exhaustive survey" of the photographs housed in Smithsonian facilities.

Moss continued as director of the reorganized Office of Smithsonian Institution Archives in 1993, which contained an Archives Division, an Institutional History Division, and a National Collections Program. Pamela M. Henson succeeded Moss as acting director in 1993, followed by John F. Jameson Fr. in 1994. In 1994, Edie Hedlin became Director. She served until 2005, presiding over the transition to electronic information and the creation of the first websites. The "fourth (and last) printed Guide to the Smithsonian Archives ... described over 1,100 record units comprising some 15,500 cubic feet of archival material," and appeared in 1996. Many archival records were moved to a storage facility, Iron Mountain, in 1997. Acting Director Thomas Soapes served from 2005 to 2007, followed by the present (as of 2012) Director, Anne Van Camp.

The Archives division consisted of three divisions: a Records Management (RM) Team, the Arrangement and Description Team which created "finding aids, bibliographic records, and agency histories" and the Reference Team responding to visits and remote queries from researchers. The Records Management Team took over the work of the Arrangement and Description Team in 2007. The Preservation Team, responsible for long-term preservation of Smithsonian Archives materials, consultation, and outreach, is part of the larger Technical Services Division. It offers services on a fee basis to other archives and repositories, including offsite storage at the Boyers, Pennsylvania facility. The Smithsonian Center for Archives Conservation was created with initial funding of $100,000, provided by Eleanor McMillan, which supported the salary of a paper conservator. The Institutional History Division has authored an online history of the Smithsonian, and provides web access to over 3,000 digital images. The 12-volume Joseph Henry Papers Project, a history of the first Secretary of the Smithsonian Institution, was published in 2007. The Electronic Records Division has held digital records since the mid-1990s, and works with "risk management, preservation and conservation" of data in current and obsolete formats, including archiving of the Smithsonian websites. It has also conducted joint research on e-mail record preservation with the Rockefeller Archive Center.

The Smithsonian Institution Archives moved into the Capital Gallery Building in August 2006, and has "a state-of-the-art storage facility; a reading room; several special viewing/listening rooms; processing and preservation space; digital imaging and audiovisual processing facilities; an oral history interview studio; and a conservation lab."

The Smithsonian Libraries and Smithsonian Institution Archives merged in December 2020.

== Collections ==
=== Subjects ===
The collections held by the Libraries reflect the various disciplines and scholarly pursuits of the curators and researchers of the Smithsonian Institution. Strengths in the collections include the following areas:

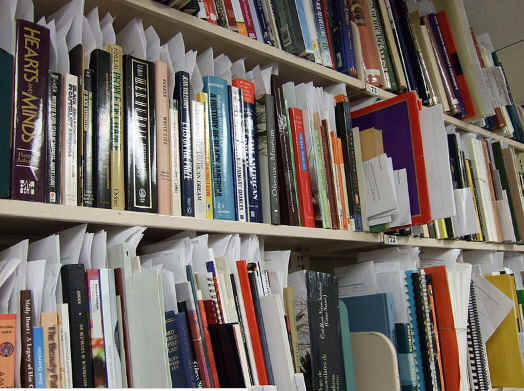
Books on shelves in the Libraries' Discovery Services Division, prior to assignment of subject and descriptive metadata

- Arts: U.S., Americas, Africa, Asia, Middle East
- Design and decorative arts
- History and cultures: U.S., African American, Latino, Native American
- Postal history
- World's Fair ephemera
- Aviation history and space flight
- History of science and technology
- Natural history, tropical biology, environmental management, and ecology
- Physical and cultural anthropology
- Materials research
- Museology

The Smithsonian Libraries also holds the United States' largest trade literature collection, which includes nearly commercial catalogs dating from the early nineteenth century, representing about 40,000 companies.

=== General collections libraries, with their subject specialties ===
Most of the Smithsonian Libraries are located in the Washington, D.C., area, where most of the Smithsonian Institution's museums and research centers are. Other locations include New York City; Suitland, Maryland; Edgewater, Maryland; and the Republic of Panama.

- American Art Museum / National Portrait Gallery Library / Renwick Gallery Library (Washington, D.C.): American art, portraiture, American history and biography, and American crafts.
- Anacostia Community Museum Library (Washington, D.C.): supports work on history and culture of the African diaspora in the D.C. area and more broadly in the Western hemisphere. Subjects include Upper South, African American women, slavery and abolitionism, and religion and the African American community. It houses some library materials from the National Museum of African American History and Culture while the museum is under construction.
- Botany and Horticulture Library (National Museum of Natural History, Washington, D.C.): plant systematics, botanical history, ethnobotany, botanical art/design/illustration, floriculture, arboriculture, integrated pest management, gardening, plantscaping, etc.
- Cooper-Hewitt, National Design Museum Library (New York, New York): design and decorative art from the Renaissance to the present.
- Freer Gallery of Art and Arthur M. Sackler Gallery Library (Washington, D.C.): artistic traditions/cultures of the peoples of Asia. Chinese and Japanese art represent about half of the collection.
- Hirshhorn Museum and Sculpture Garden Library (Washington, D.C.): modern and contemporary art, including painting, sculpture, drawings, prints, photography, video, and emerging art forms.
- John Wesley Powell Library of Anthropology (National Museum of Natural History, Washington, D.C.): physical anthropology, archaeology, cultural anthropology, linguistics, forensic science, area studies.
- Museum Support Center Library (Suitland, Maryland): collections storage, research, and conservation.
- National Air and Space Museum Library (Washington, D.C.): space and aviation history, air transport, astronomy/astrophysics, terrestrial and exogeology, remote sensing, spacecraft design and instrumentation, etc.
- National Museum of African American History and Culture Library (Washington, D.C.): all aspects of the African American experience.
- National Museum of American History Library (Washington, D.C.): history of technology, all aspects of American history—social, cultural, political, and economic, history of everyday American life, etc.
- National Museum of Natural History Library (Washington, D.C.): general science, biology, ecology, evolution, biodiversity, geology, paleontology, conservation, etc. Includes sub-branches/satellite libraries in Invertebrate and Vertebrate Zoology, Mineral Sciences, Paleobiology.
- National Postal Museum Library (Washington, D.C.): postal and philatelic history.
- National Zoological Park Library (Washington, D.C. and Front Royal, Virginia): veterinary medicine, pathology, genetics, nutrition, behavior, husbandry, wildlife conservation, biodiversity, zoo and aquarium horticulture.
- Smithsonian Environmental Research Center Library (Edgewater, Maryland): global change, population and community ecology, coastal ecosystems. Emphasis on Chesapeake Bay area.

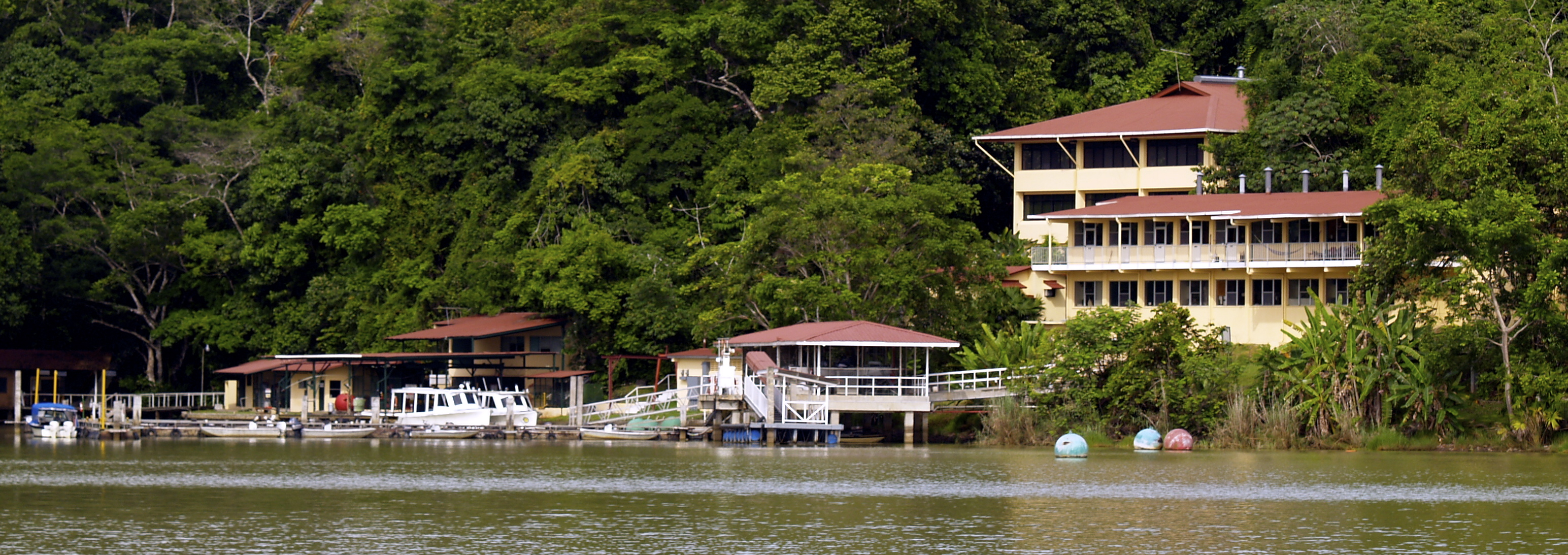
The Smithsonian Tropical Research Institute Library in Panama has a branch at the research station on Barro Colorado Island.

- Smithsonian Tropical Research Institute Library (Republic of Panama) :tropical biology, ecology, conservation, pharmacognosy, ecotourism, etc. Main site is in Panama City; branches in research stations on Barro Colorado Island on Gatun Lake, and on Colón Island, Bocas del Toro Province.
- Vine Deloria Jr. Library, National Museum of the American Indian, (Suitland, Maryland): all aspects of American Indian history and cultures, including architecture, health, law, education, music, dancing, religion, languages and literatures, pow-wows, etc.
- Warren M. Robbins Library, National Museum of African Art (Washington, D.C.): African visual arts, including architecture, painting, sculpture, prints, pottery, textiles, popular culture, photography, rock art.

=== Special collections ===
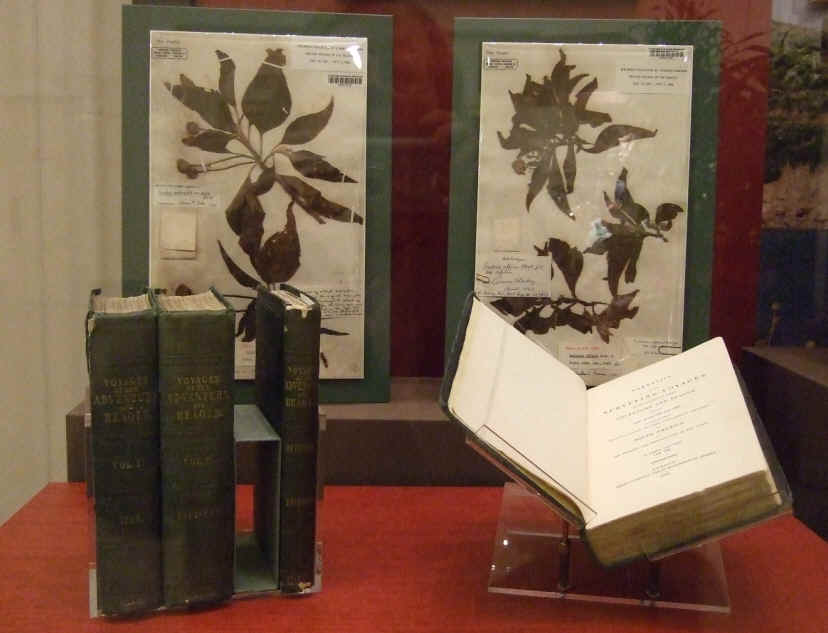
Narrative of the surveying voyages of His Majesty's ships Adventure and Beagle between the years 1826 and 1836. by Robert FitzRoy, published 1839. Cullman Library, SIL exhibition.

While all Smithsonian libraries hold some special collections material, two libraries comprise the Special Collections Department which is primarily dedicated to that purpose. According to its mission statement, "The Special Collections Department arranges, describes, houses, and provides access to the rare books, manuscripts, and special collections held in the two dedicated special collections libraries of Smithsonian Institution Libraries." Access is provided to Smithsonian Institution curators, researchers, and other staff as well as outside scholars by appointment.

The Dibner Library of the History of Science and Technology contains 35,000 books and 2,000 manuscripts related to the history of science and technology. Established in 1976 with a donation from Bern Dibner from his Burndy Library for the United States Bicentennial, the Dibner Library is housed in the National Museum of American History.

The Cullman Library of Natural History holds some 10,000 volumes published before 1840 in the fields of anthropology and natural sciences. The Cullman Library is also located at the National Museum of Natural History.

Additionally, the National Air and Space Museum Library features special collections housed in both the Dewitt Clinton Ramsey Room and the Aerospace Legacy Materials Collection Gift Collection (ALM Collection). Located in the National Air and Space Museum's Mall location, the Dewitt Clinton Ramsey Room houses rare books, serials, oral histories, vertical files, and the Bella Landauer Collection of sheet music. Housed in the Smithsonian Institution Libraries’ Research Annex in Landover, Maryland, the ALM Collection is a growing body of largely grey literature in the form of government manuals, reports, studies, and surveys capturing the history and evolution of civil aviation.

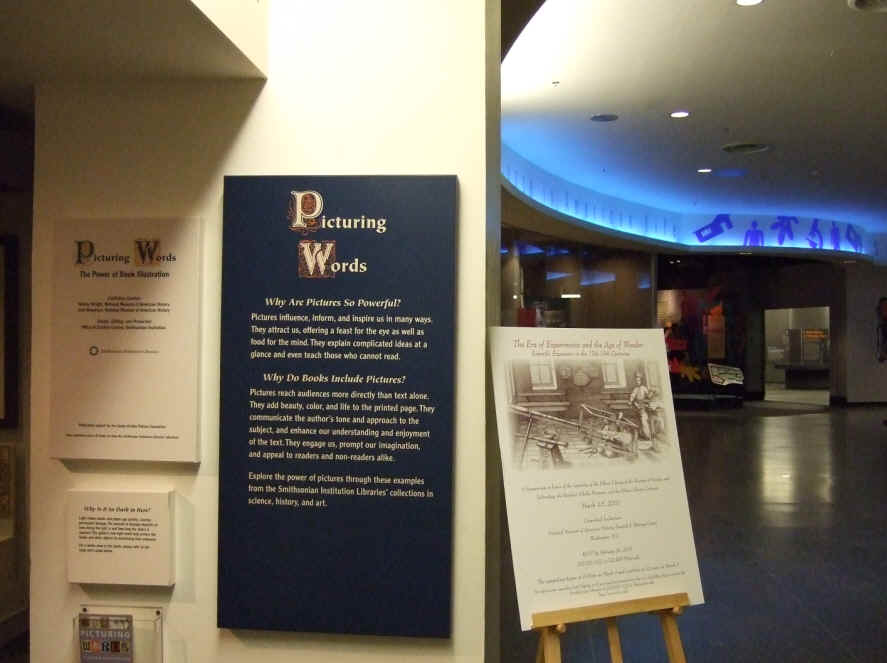
SIL exhibition: Picturing Words, the Power of Book Illustration. The Digital Services Division manages the online presence of SIL's exhibitions.

=== Archives ===
The organization's archives consist of material related to art, history, science and the humanities. This includes document, image, audio-visual, electronic, oral history, and video history collections about expeditions, biographies, and general history about the Smithsonian Institution.

== Digital initiatives ==
Digital initiatives are conducted by cross-disciplinary teams that include staff from the Division of Digital Programs and Initiatives and other divisions. In addition to digitized print collections, the Libraries also actively preserve born-digital materials. They include publications, images, collections and objects such as online exhibits, webcasts, finding aids, digital versions of print editions, bibliographies, etc. The organization's digital collections include over 35,000 digitized books and manuscripts along with digitized photo collections, ephemera, and seed catalogs. Separately indexed collections of bibliographies, photos, and ephemera include the Hirshhorn Museum Library Audio Archive, Postal Files at the Smithsonian National Postal Museum Library, the E. F. Caldwell & Co. Collection of lighting fixtures at the Cooper-Hewitt Museum Library, and Art & Artists Files. Smithsonian Research Online provides a database of citations and full texts of publications by Smithsonian scholars and scientists.

The Smithsonian Libraries is a founding member and was the original headquarters for the Biodiversity Heritage Library. Digitized books are provided through the Biodiversity Heritage Library and indexed in both the Smithsonian's Collections Search and through the Digital Public Library of America. Their mass digitization efforts operation partners with the Internet Archive. In-house digitization locations include an Imaging Center in Landover, Maryland, and a Digitization Suite in the Natural History Building in Washington, D.C.

=== Digitization software ===
Macaw is an open-source metadata collection tool written by Joel Richard in the Digital Services Division. Macaw accomplishes 3 tasks in the scanning workflow: (1) import and manage images from input device (scanner or camera); (2) collect page-level metadata about physical aspects of scanned page; (3) post-processing and exporting digital book to other systems.

== Exhibitions ==
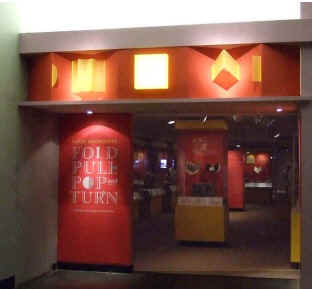
Smithsonian Libraries exhibition: Paper Engineering: Fold, Pull, Pop, & Turn.

The Libraries frequently creates exhibitions, often in collaboration with other organizations and scholars within and outside the Smithsonian. Many exhibitions have a digital component. A representative selection of Smithsonian Libraries and Archives exhibits include Artists Books and Africa, Once There Were Billions: Vanished Birds of North America, Cultivating America's Gardens, Fantastic Worlds, and Paper Engineering: Fold, Pull, Pop & Turn.

Additionally, Smithsonian Libraries is the home of Library and Archival Exhibitions on the Web. This international database features over 3,000 links to online exhibitions from libraries, archives, historical societies, museums, and other scholarly institutions around the world.

== Research opportunities, fellowships, internships ==
The Smithsonian Libraries and Archives offers research opportunities for historians, librarians, pre-doctoral and post-doctoral scholars wishing to conduct research in the history of science and technology or in areas pertaining to other special collections:

- Baird Society Resident Scholar Program
- Dibner Library Resident Scholar Program

Also offered are internship opportunities for students and recent graduates who wish to gain experience in archives or museum libraries.

== Gallery ==
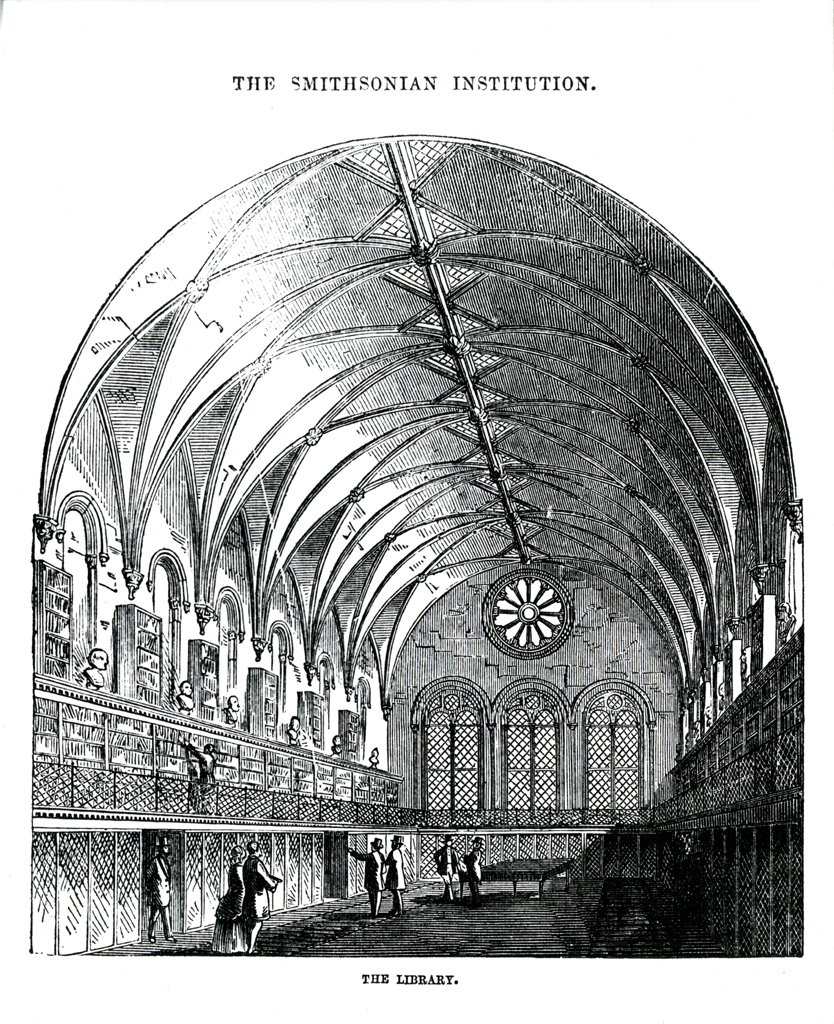
Print of an engraving of the library in the west end of the Smithsonian Institution Building, 1857

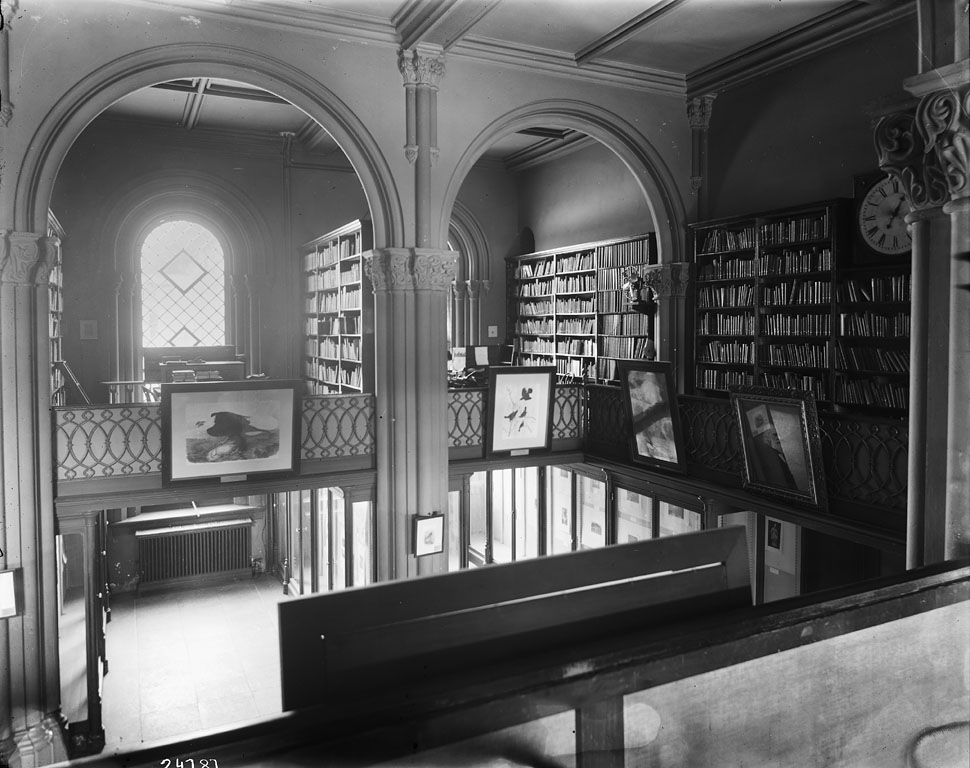
Library Stacks, balcony of the main hall, Smithsonian Institution Building, prior to 1914

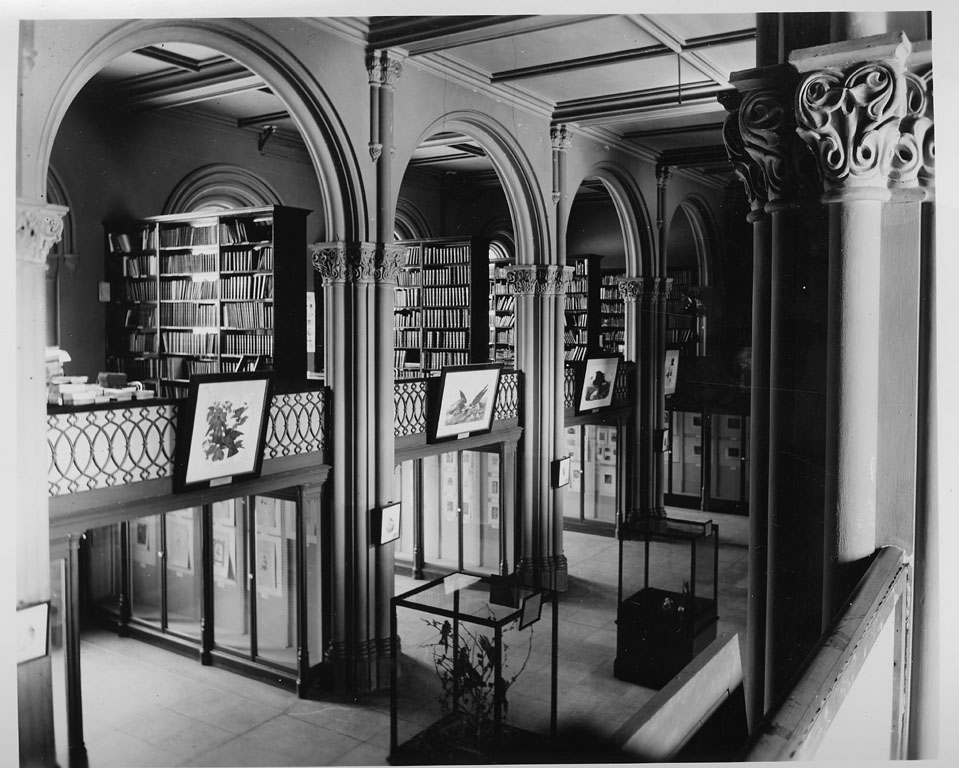
Library stacks in the main hall of the Smithsonian Institution Building, prior to 1914

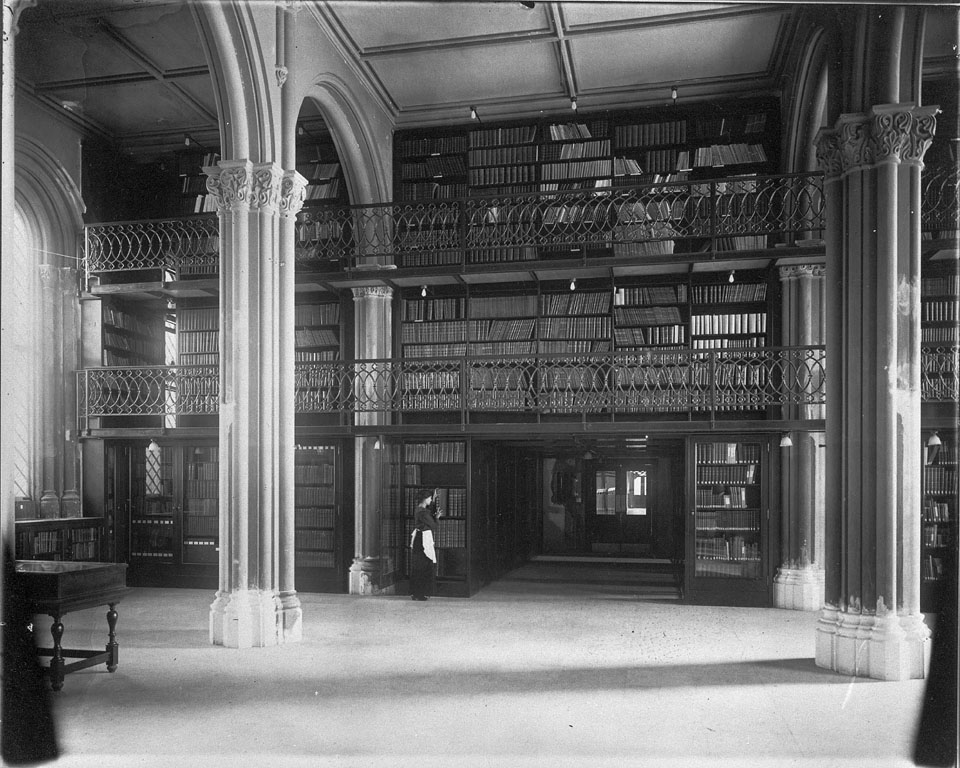
Library, lower main hall, Smithsonian Institution Building, 1914
