= Nancy E. Gwinn =

American librarian (1945–2024)

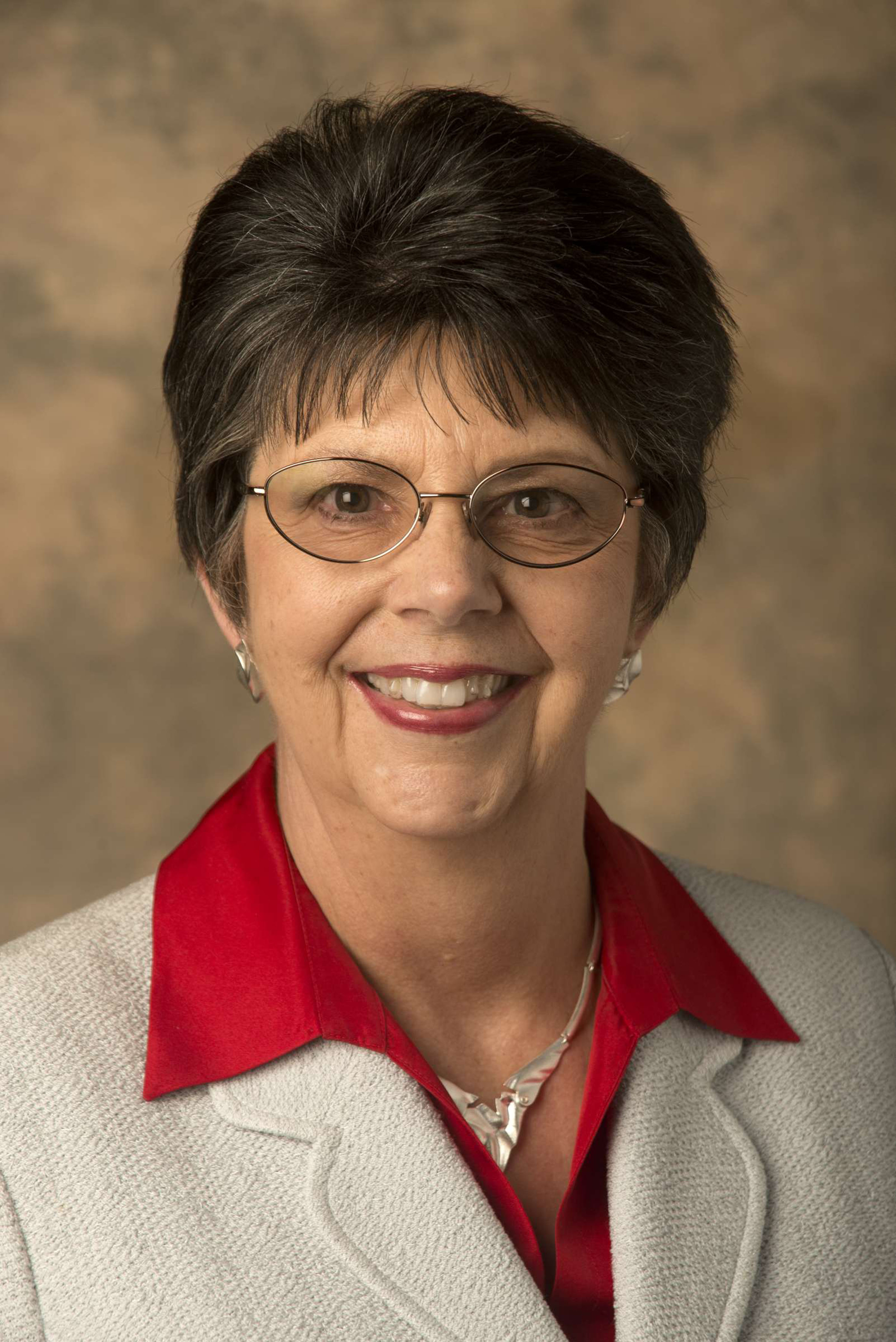
- Born: August 19, 1945; Sheridan, Wyoming, U.S.
- Died: April 29, 2024 (aged 78); Washington, D.C., U.S
- Education: University of Wyoming; University of Michigan; George Washington University
- Occupations: Director of the Smithsonian Libraries (1997–2020)

Nancy E. Gwinn (August 19, 1945 – April 29, 2024) was an American librarian and administrator. She was the director of the Smithsonian Libraries, the world's largest museum library system, from 1997 until her retirement in 2020. Gwinn died on April 29, 2024, at the age of 78.

== Education and career ==
Nancy Gwinn was born in Sheridan, Wyoming on August 19, 1945. She earned a Bachelor of Arts degree in 1967 from the University of Wyoming; after graduating, she attended the University of Oxford on a Fulbright scholarship. She went on to earn a Master of Library Science at the University of Michigan School of Library Science in 1969, and a Ph.D. in American civilization from George Washington University in 1996.

Gwinn started her library career in 1969 working as a reference librarian at the Library of Congress. From 1975 to 1980, she worked at the Council on Library and Information Resources, and in 1980 she became the associate director and program coordinator at the Research Library Group, where she was instrumental in founding the RLG Preservation Program, developing a model for libraries to collaborate on preservation microfilming.

Gwinn joined the Smithsonian Institution Libraries as the assistant director for library collections management in 1984. In 1997 she became director of the Smithsonian Libraries, where she led 130 research and curatorial staff in preserving cultural history. During her tenure, Gwinn expanded outreach, bolstered the Libraries' rare book and electronic collections, and created the first Libraries Advisory Board to assist with fundraising. Under her leadership, the Smithsonian Libraries initiated and became the lead partner in establishing the Biodiversity Heritage Library, an international consortium of natural history and botanical libraries dedicated to digitizing and providing open access to works from their collections. Gwinn served as chair of the Biodiversity Heritage Library Members Council from 2011 to 2017.

== Library leadership and awards ==
Gwinn has held a number of leadership roles in library organizations, including serving as president of the District of Columbia Library Association from 1979 to 1980, chairing the Association of Research Libraries Committee on Preservation of Library Material, and serving as secretary of the Standing Committee on Preservation and Conservation of the International Federation of Library Associations (IFLA). She has also served as a member of the IFLA Governing Board from 2004 to 2009 and as chair of its Professional Committee from 2007 to 2009.

In 2012 Gwinn was awarded the Ainsworth Rand Spofford President's Award by the District of Columbia Library Association, in recognition of "outstanding contributions to the development or improvement of library and information services".

The University of Wyoming awarded her an honorary doctorate degree in 2013.

Since 2003 Gwinn and her husband, Library of Congress Historian John Y. Cole, have maintained endowments to support the internships of library and information science students at the Smithsonian Libraries and at the University of Michigan School of Information. They also fund an endowment for supporting the operations of the technical services of the University of Wyoming Libraries and the Library of Congress Center for the Book.

== Selected publications ==
Gwinn was the author of several books on library and historical subjects, including Preservation Microfilming for which the Society of American Archivists awarded her the 1988 Waldo Gifford Leland Award.

- Gwinn, Nancy E., and Johanna G. Wellheiser. 2011. Preparing for the Worst, Planning for the Best: Protecting Our Cultural Heritage from Disaster: Proceedings of a Special IFLA Conference Held in Berlin in July 2003. Berlin: K.G. Saur. https://doi.org/10.1515/9783110931440.
- Smithsonian Institution, Mary Augusta Thomas, Nancy E. Gwinn, Michael Dirda, and Storrs L. Olson. 2002. An Odyssey in Print: Adventures in the Smithsonian Libraries. Washington: Smithsonian Institution Press, [2002].
- Gwinn, Nancy E., Lisa L. Fox, and Association of Research Libraries. 1996. Preservation Microfilming : A Guide for Librarians and Archivists. 2nd ed. Chicago, IL: American Library Association.
- Gwinn, Nancy E. 1989. The Smithsonian Institution Libraries: A Foot in Three Camps. [Chicago, Ill.]: American Library Association.
- Gwinn, Nancy E., United States Federal Library Committee, and Library of Congress. 1984. Federal Information Policies: Emerging Issues on Managing Information Resources. Washington: Library of Congress.
