= Étienne-Jehandier Desrochers =

French engraver

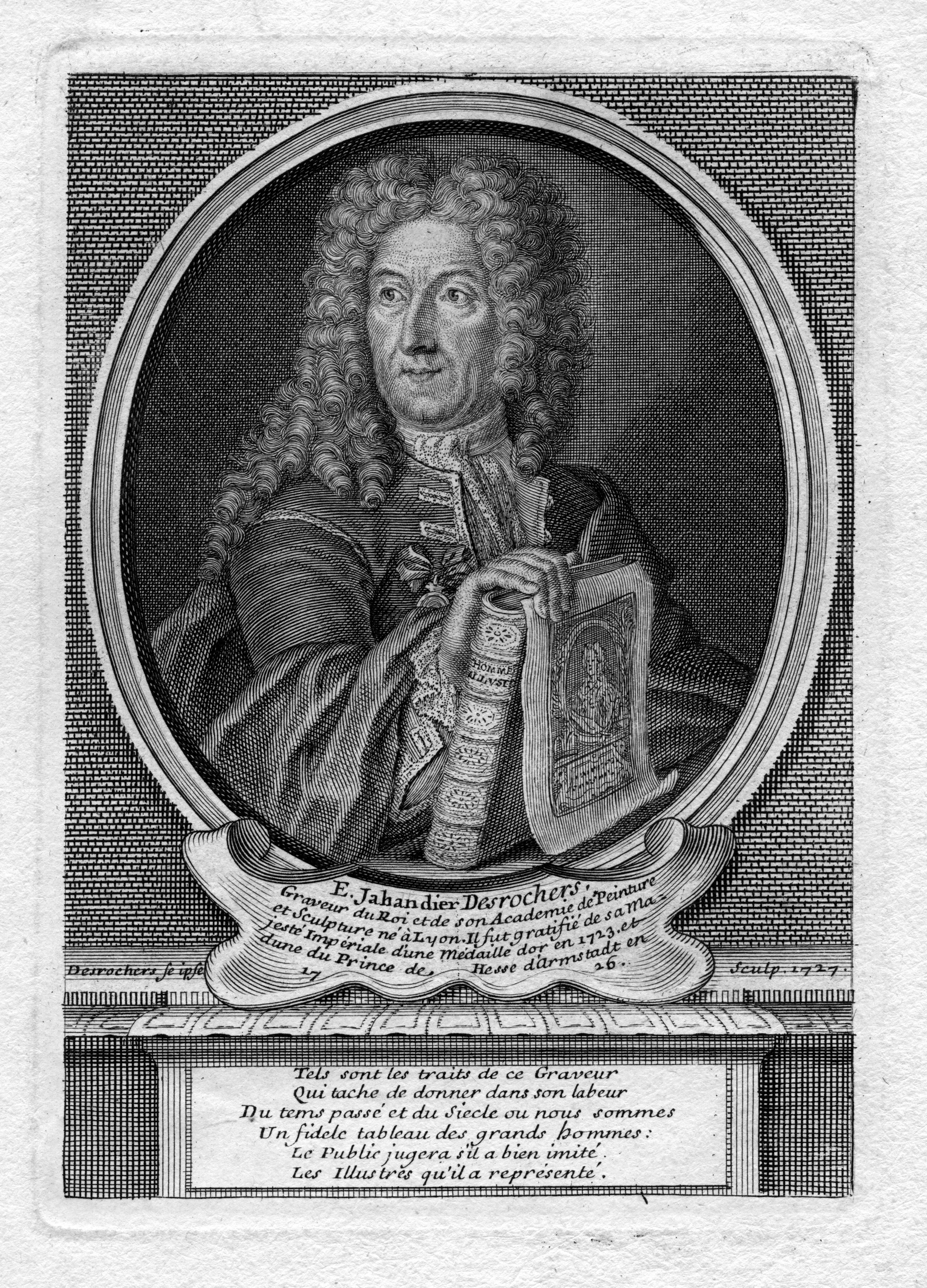
Étienne-Jehandier Desrochers

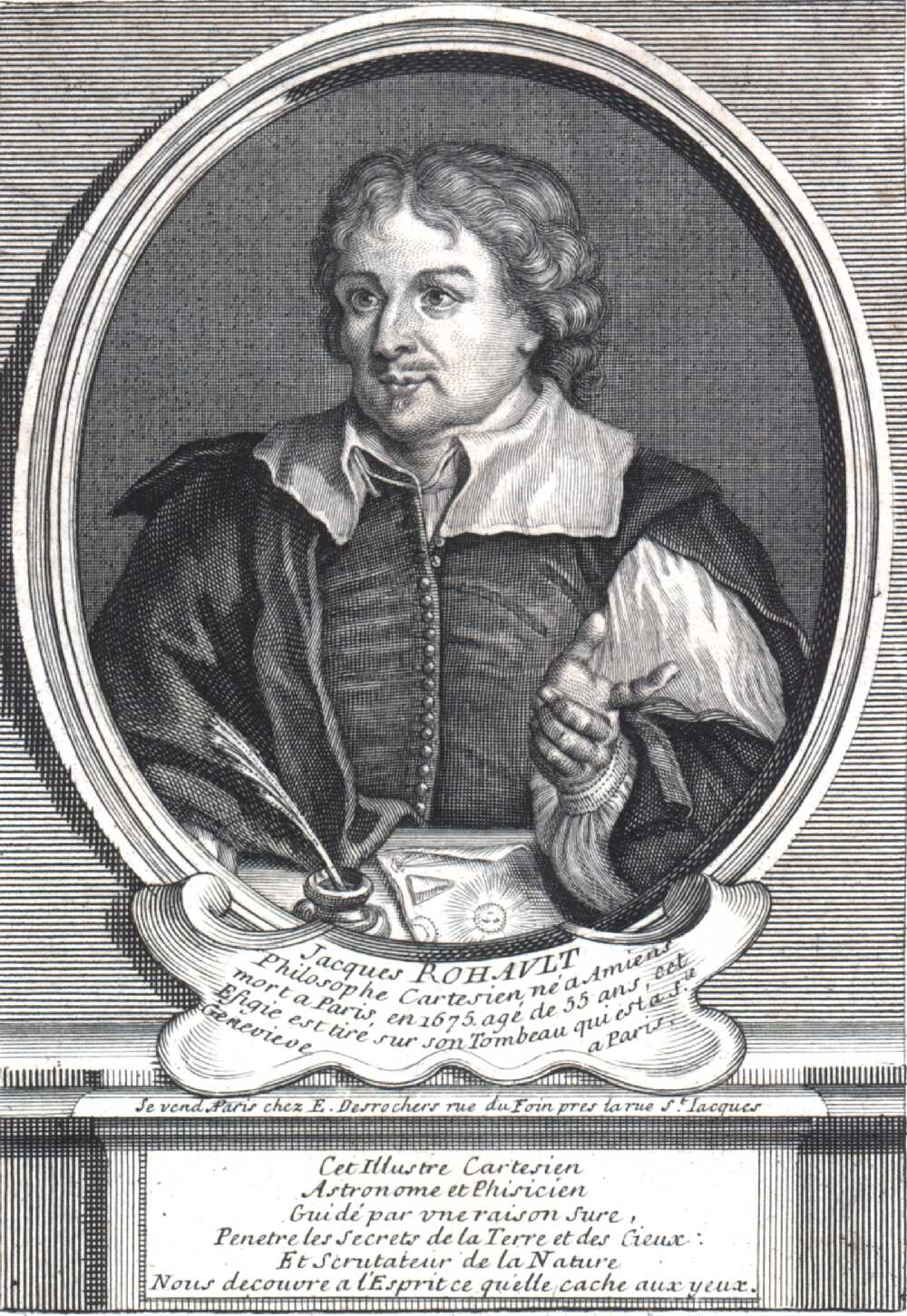
Portrait of Jacques Rohault by Étienne-Jehandier Desrochers, Dibner Institute for the History of Science and Technology

Étienne-Jehandier Desrochers (1668, Lyon – 1741, Paris) was an 18th-century French engraver best known for his small portraits of his contemporaries.

== Some Engravings ==
- Collection of engravings in London
- John Theophilus Desaguliers
- "Portrait of John Law, half-length, head turned to the right, with unrolled parchment in left hand; within oval. 1720"
- "Danae, sprawling semi-nude on a richly draped bed… (1700-1702"
- "Prince Eugene of Savoy, head-and-shoulders portrait..."

== Main illustrated books ==
- Jean de La Fontaine, Fables choisies, Paris & La Haye, chez Henry Van Bulderen, marchand libraire dans le Pooten, à l'enseigne de Mezeray, 1688 [?].
- Nicolas de La Mare, Traité de la police, Paris, Jean & Pierre Cot, 1705-1719; rééd. chez Michel Brunet, 1722.
- Nicolas Malebranche, De la recherche de la vérité..., Paris, chez Michel David, 1712.
- Abbé de Bellegarde, De l'Imitation de Jésus-Christ, traduction nouvelle, plus ample que toutes les précédentes..., Paris, Imprimerie de Jacques Collombat, 1725.
- Évrard Titon du Tillet, Le Parnasse françois, Paris, imprimerie de Jean-Baptiste Coignard fils, 1732.
