= Bern Dibner =

American engineer, industrialist, and historian of science (1897–1988)

- Born: August 18, 1897; Lysianka, Ukraine
- Died: January 6, 1988 (aged 90); Wilton, Connecticut, U.S.
- Education: Hebrew Technical Institute Polytechnic Institute of Brooklyn
- Spouse: Barbara Dibner
- Engineering career
- Significant design: Solderless electrical connectors

Bern Dibner (18 August 1897 – 6 January 1988) was an American electrical engineer, industrialist, and historian of science and technology. He made his fortune by founding the Burndy Engineering Company, which produced electrical components including the first patented solderless electrical connectors, and then he originated two major US library collections in the history of science and technology: the Burndy Library, a collection housed at the Huntington Library in California since 2006, and the Dibner Library of the Smithsonian Institution in Washington, D.C. since 1976. He was a winner of both the Leonardo da Vinci Medal (1975) for the history of technology and the George Sarton Medal for the history of science (1976).

== Early life and education ==
Dibner was born in Lysianka, near Kiev, Ukraine on August 18, 1897. His family was Jewish. He moved to the United States with his family at the age of 7. In 1921, he graduated from the Polytechnic Institute of Brooklyn with a degree in Electrical Engineering.

== Engineering career ==
Soon after graduating, after working as an engineer on the electrification of Cuba, Dibner designed and patented the first solderless electrical connectors and founded the Burndy Engineering Company in 1924. His starting capital was taken from worker's compensation for a printing press accident.

The "Burndy" appellation, used for both his company and the library he would found, was represents a portmanteau or blend of his first and last names.

The company later became the Burndy Corporation and was bought by the French corporation Framatome Connectors International (FCI) in 1988 for approximately $326 million. In 2009, Burndy was acquired and became a subsidiary of Hubbell Incorporated for $360 million in cash.

In 1954, Dibner was a board member of the American Jewish League Against Communism.

== History of science career ==
In addition to electrical engineering, Dibner studied the history of technology beginning in the 1930s. He was an avid collector of original scientific works and of books on the history of science, as well as thousands of portraits of various scientists. Bern Dibner also wrote a great number of books on the history of science, such as the history of science bibliography Heralds of Science in 1955 and the history of the transatlantic telegraph cable in The Atlantic Cable in 1959.

Dibner was particularly fascinated by the combination of art and technology in the work of Leonardo da Vinci. He assembled a library of works about da Vinci which grew over the years as Dibner's interests expanded into the history of electricity, the history of Renaissance technology, and finally the history of science and technology in general.

In 1976 he was awarded the Sarton Medal by the History of Science Society, and in 1983 he was honored with the Sir Thomas More Medal for Book Collecting, "Private Collecting for the Public Good," by the University of San Francisco Gleeson Library and the Gleeson Library Associates.

=== Burndy Library ===
In 1941 Dibner formally established the Burndy Library as a separate institution "to advance scholarship in the history of science." By 1964, the Burndy Library collection totaled over 25,000 volumes and Dibner opened a new building in Norwalk, Connecticut, to house the Library.

After his death, the Burndy Library moved to Cambridge, Massachusetts, in 1992, where it became the research library for the Dibner Institute for the History of Science and Technology at the Massachusetts Institute of Technology. In November 2006, the complete Burndy Library collection, by then consisting of 67,000 rare volumes and a collection of scientific instruments, was donated to and became part of the Huntington Library in San Marino, California, where it is available to scholars. The Huntington Library has offered a Dibner History of Science Program to fund fellowships, a lecture series and annual conference.

=== Smithsonian Dibner Library ===
In 1974, Dibner donated one-quarter of the Burndy Library's holdings to the Smithsonian Institution to form the nucleus of a research library in the history of science and technology. In 1976, the Smithsonian established the Dibner Library of the History of Science and Technology, providing the Smithsonian Institution Libraries with its first rare book collection, containing many of the major works dating from the fifteenth to the early nineteenth centuries in the history of science and technology including engineering, transportation, chemistry, mathematics, physics, electricity and astronomy. It was initially located in the National Museum of History and Technology, which has since been renamed.

The Library, then numbering 35,000 volumes, was reopened after construction in spring 2010 in the National Museum of American History on the National Mall in Washington DC. The Smithsonian Institution Libraries catalogued the books and manuscripts of the Dibner Library and entered the records into the international database OCLC and the Smithsonian's online catalog SIRIS.

== Death ==
Dibner died at his home in Wilton, Connecticut, on January 6, 1988.

== Publications ==
- Leonardo da Vinci, Military Engineer (1946)
- Doctor William Gilbert (1947)
- Faraday Discloses Electro-magnetic Induction (1949)
- Moving the Obelisks (1950)
- Galvani-Volta, A Controversy that led to the Discovery of Useful Electricity (1952)
- Ten Founding Fathers of the Electrical Science (1954)
- Heralds of Science (1955)
- Early Electrical Machines (1957)
- Agricola on Metals (1958)
- The Atlantic Cable (1959)
- Darwin of the Beagle (1960)
- Oersted and the Discovery of Electromagnetism (1961))
- The Victoria and the Triton (1962)
- The New Rays of Prof. Röntgen (1963)
- Alessandro Volta and the Electric Battery (1964)
- Röntgen and the Discovery of X-rays (1968)
- Luigi Galvani (1971)
- Leonardo da Vinci, Machines and Weaponry (1974)
- Benjamin Franklin - Electrician (1976)
- The Burndy Library in Mitosis (1977)

== See also ==
- Electrical connector
