= Burndy Library =

American research library for history of science and technology (1941–2006)

- Location: The Bronx, New York (1941–1951), Norwalk, Connecticut (1951–1992), Cambridge, Massachusetts (1992–2006), United States
- Type: Research library
- Scope: History of science and technology
- Established: 1941
- Dissolved: 2006

The Burndy Library (1941–2006) was a private research library on the history of science and technology, assembled by the electrical engineer and industrialist Bern Dibner and named for his Burndy Engineering Corporation. The collection grew to some 67,000 volumes, with particular strengths in electricity and magnetism and in works by and about Isaac Newton.

Dibner began collecting in 1929 and founded the library in 1941 within Burndy Engineering Corporation. In 1951 his company moved to Norwalk, Connecticut, and in 1964 the library was given a building of its own there. In 1974, Dibner donated a quarter of the holdings—roughly 10,000 books and the entire manuscript collection—to the Smithsonian Institution to mark the United States Bicentennial; the gift was announced the following year and the material reached Washington in 1976, when the Smithsonian's Dibner Library of the History of Science and Technology opened.

The remaining collection moved to the Massachusetts Institute of Technology in 1992, alongside the newly established Dibner Institute for the History of Science and Technology. In November 2006, the library was transferred to the Huntington Library in San Marino, California, where the collection has supported fellowships in the history of science, a lecture series and an annual conference.

The Burndy Library hosted exhibitions, memorials and events related to science and its history. Dibner directed the library himself into his late eighties. After his passing, the library was managed by trustees at Dibner Institute for the History of Science and Technology, with David Dibner, son of Bern Dibner, serving as its president.

== Description ==
The Burndy Library held primary works in the history of science and technology dating from antiquity to the 20th century. In 1985, science historian I. Bernard Cohen put its Norwalk holdings at 30,000 volumes, 3,000 prints and photographs, and 500 artifacts, and described it as "the greatest private library ever assembled" on the natural world; by the time of the 2006 transfer to the Huntington Library the collection numbered 67,000 volumes, 47,000 of them rare books. In 2005, the Pittsburgh Post-Gazette called it "one of the nation's pre-eminent collections" in the field where few collections in the United States matched it for size, breadth and research use.

The collection's cutoff was 1900, a date its founder, Bern Dibner, chose on the view that the major theories of the physical sciences were already in place; he made exceptions for later work, acquiring material by and about Planck, Einstein, Rutherford, Bohr and Fermi. Cohen described electricity and magnetism as the most complete area of the collection; after the Smithsonian transfer Dibner rebuilt his holdings in the domain to 13,000 volumes. Separate cases held Japanese scientific works of the 17th to 19th centuries and scientific literature in Russian.

Works by and about Isaac Newton were among the library's particular strengths; a 2005 account placed the Burndy's Newton holdings among the three finest such gatherings in the world. They included books Newton had owned and annotated, and more than a dozen of his manuscripts, most of them concerning alchemy and chemistry. The library also held some 200 volumes of Vinciana (works by and about Leonardo da Vinci), all of Charles Darwin's published works, manuscript and printed material by Louis Pasteur including three of his notebooks, more than 300 scientific incunabula, and a copy of Archimedes' Opera (Basel, 1544), the first printing of his works in the original Greek, from the library of the French bibliophile Jacques Auguste de Thou.

== History ==
The Burndy Library was founded in 1941 by Bern Dibner, an electrical engineer and industrialist who established it as an educational institution and gave it the name of his Burndy Engineering Corporation. The name "Burndy" was an acronym drawn from his first name and last initial. Dibner began collecting in 1929, after a list of Leonardo da Vinci's scientific and technical achievements in Stuart Chase's Men and Machines left him doubting that one man could have anticipated so much; he began working through everything available on Leonardo, then widened his collecting to Leonardo's predecessors and successors.

In its first decade, the collection was kept at the company itself in locked metal cases that filled colleagues' offices and in conference rooms that came to be known as the Newton, Leonardo, Galileo and Einstein rooms. The company relocated in 1951 to an eleven-acre property in Norwalk, Connecticut. In 1964, the library was detached from the company and given a building of its own on the same site, holding the 25,000 volumes it had by then acquired.

From 1942, the library ran its own publishing program, issuing at least one work a year and alternating between general science and electricity and magnetism; 24 titles had appeared by 1970, the first being Cohen's Roemer and the First Determination of the Velocity of Light. It also supported translations of major works, among them Edward Rosen's of Copernicus's De revolutionibus orbium coelestium and Cohen's of Galvani's treatise on electrical forces in muscular motion.

Dibner gave a quarter of the library's holdings to the Smithsonian Institution in 1974, a gift made to mark the United States Bicentennial. Smithsonian secretary S. Dillon Ripley and Dibner announced the gift jointly in 1975, saying that the Norwalk library would go on serving researchers with duplicates and with copies of the more important material being transferred. The material—roughly 10,000 printed books together with the entire manuscript collection, including 320 incunabula and all 200 works listed in Heralds of Science—reached Washington in 1976. The Dibner Library of the History of Science and Technology opened there that year, remaining part of the Smithsonian Libraries at the National Museum of American History.

By the mid-1980s there were two libraries in place of one: the Washington collection which was formal and consulted by appointment, and the Norwalk library that kept earlier informality where visitors could take books from the shelves themselves. Dibner helped plan the Dibner Institute for the History of Science and Technology at the Massachusetts Institute of Technology (MIT) and took part in its inaugural meeting on December 6, 1987, a month before his death at the age of 90.

After Dibner's death the collection stayed in Norwalk until preparations to move it to MIT began in 1991. It was installed on the MIT campus in 1992 at Building E56, alongside the newly established Dibner Institute.

By January 2005, the Burndy Library collection at MIT held 50,000 rare books and 30,000 secondary titles. With the agreement that had kept the collection at MIT since 1992 due to expire in August 2007, the library was weighing a move that would take two years to plan. Sixteen institutions applied, among them a joint bid from the University of Pittsburgh and Carnegie Mellon University, Johns Hopkins University, Indiana University Bloomington, and a consortium of Philadelphia universities.

In November 2006, 67,000 volumes—which included 47,000 rare books and 20,000 reference works—along with several hundred manuscript collections and some 650 objects were transferred to the Huntington Library in San Marino, California, as a gift of the Dibner family and the Dibner Fund. At the Huntington, the collection has supported fellowships in the history of science, a lecture series and an annual conference.

== Buildings ==
The Norwalk building was planned from 1961 after the collection outgrew the offices and conference rooms it occupied inside the Burndy Engineering Corporation. The Stamford firm Sherwood, Mills & Smith designed the replacement, specifying air conditioning and humidity and temperature control intended to preserve the contents for a century. The building was completed early in 1964, dedicated that May, and given an architectural award the same year.

On the ground floor, the main reading room held some 22,000 general science volumes, organized by subject name from astronomy to zoology in glass-fronted cases. Some 8,000 volumes on electricity and magnetism filled the mezzanine floor, arranged by author name. Cases on both levels were set aside for Newton, Einstein, Edison, Faraday, Franklin, Galvani and Volta, the last holding more than 300 volumes from Volta's own library.

Three rooms on the lower floor were given over to exhibitions and meetings: the Faraday Room, a hall for temporary shows; the Leonardo Room, where the Vinciana stood in cases beneath mural enlargements of Leonardo's drawings and which doubled as a lounge and seminar space; and the Sarton Room, named for the Harvard historian of science George Sarton and used for lectures. The reading room upstairs had a concealed blackboard and a built-in projection screen, and could seat almost 200.

Portraits hung in the main reading room, among them Galileo, Faraday, Samuel Morse and Josiah Willard Gibbs; six came from a gift of twenty-one paintings made by IBM in 1966 and 1967. The sculpture ran to a marble bust of Newton carved about 1800 and once owned by Robert Peel, busts of Volta, Edison and Hertz on the mezzanine, statuettes of Robert Stephenson and Isambard Kingdom Brunel flanking the entrance, and the piece Friedlander rated the finest in the building, a bronze casting of Houdon's 1778 bust of Franklin.

When the library moved to MIT in 1992 it occupied building E56, which had a garden laid out in front of it that year holding a bust of Copernicus and a sundial. E56 came down in early 2007, its site given over to a new MIT Sloan School of Management building, and plants, pin oaks and stone from the garden were reused elsewhere on campus.

== Directors and staff ==
Bern Dibner was the library's founder and its director. At 88, he was still supervising the Norwalk library's daily operations including acquisitions, loans, tours and exhibitions. Robert E. Kohler was assistant director at Norwalk from 1970 until 1973, when he left for a professorship in the history and philosophy of science at the University of Pennsylvania.

At MIT, the library answered to a board of trustees, with Dibner's son David Dibner as its president. The first librarian for the library at the Dibner Institute at its founding in 1992 was Christine A. Ruggere, who had been a curator of special collections at the University of Pennsylvania. On October 1, 2004, the trustees appointed Philip N. Cronenwett, a medieval historian, as director of the library.

At the Huntington Library, five posts were funded by the $11.6 million endowment that accompanied the collection there in 2006: a curator, a conservator, a cataloguer, a reader-services librarian, and an associate curator added to meet the additional use the collection brought.

== Reception and scholarship ==
The library kept a guest book from 1954. The Leonardo scholar Ladislao Reti was its first entry, followed by the Harvard historian of science I. Bernard Cohen, the Yale physiologist John F. Fulton, Herman W. Liebert, director of Yale's Beinecke Library, the historian of science Derek Price, and Nobel laureates Isidor Rabi and Charles Townes.

Exhibitions were a standing part of the library's work: it marked Einstein's death with a memorial show in 1955 and the 250th anniversary of Franklin's birth in 1956, hosted a Faraday exhibition with the American Institute of Physics and the IEEE in 1968, and assembled "Man's Conquest of the Moon" in 1969. With Fairfield University, the library sponsored a series of lectures on the history and philosophy of science. Cohen wrote in 1985 that the library remained a primary source of visual material illustrating almost any part of science or technology.

At MIT, the Burndy Library served as the scholarly library resource of the Dibner Institute. The institute planned on fifteen senior fellowships a term, with as many as five post-doctoral places a year. After the Burndy Library's closure, the Huntington Library continued the pattern through the Burndy endowment, funding eight research fellowships a year.
