= Dibner Institute for the History of Science and Technology =

Research institute at MIT (1992–2006)

The Dibner Institute for the History of Science and Technology (1992–2006) was a research institute established at MIT to house the Burndy Library and support academic use of the collection with visiting fellowships, lectures, symposia, seminars, and special exhibits. It was first led by director Jed Buchwald, executive director Evelyn Simha, and librarian Christine A. Ruggere. The institute was housed in a renovated building, E56, on campus at 38 Memorial Drive, overlooking the Charles River. After the institute was closed in 2006, that building was demolished in 2007 to make way for MIT's new Sloan School of Management and the major part of the collection was moved to the Huntington Library in California.

== Description ==
The institute was housed in a renovated building, E56, on campus at 38 Memorial Drive, overlooking the Charles River, dedicated on October 22, 1992. The heart of the Institute was the Burndy Library on the ground floor, initially containing 37,000 volumes on the history of science and technology collected by the Dibner Fund. Above the Library and display space, on the second and third floor, were offices and lecture and seminar rooms. Next to E56, the institute featured a new garden including a bronze sundial and a model of the Copernican heliocentric solar system.

The Library also possessed a large collection of antique scientific instruments, such as astrolabes, telescopes, microscopes, early spectrometers, and a Wimshurst machine, which were on public display in a dedicated gallery outside the library. This gallery also displayed a large collection of antique incandescent light bulbs, gas discharge tubes, vacuum tubes, and other early examples of electrical and electronic technology.

The Institute held regular lectures, seminars, study programs, and an annual symposium in the history of science and technology. Over the period of its existence, the Institute supported over 340 short- and longer-term fellowships. The Library would also mount occasional special exhibits, such as The Afterlife of Immortality: Obelisks Outside Egypt.

== History and development ==
The Institute was named in honor of Bern Dibner (1897–1988), who had conceived of it before his death. The Institute was developed and supported by the Dibner Fund he had established in 1957, directed by his son David Dibner. At its inception in 1992, the insittute was run by executive director Evelyn Simha, director Jed Z. Buchwald, and librarian Christine A. Ruggere. On the academic side, the Institute was supported by a consortium of MIT, Boston University, Brandeis University and Harvard University.

In 1995, the 600-volume Babson Collection of historical material related to Isaac Newton was placed on permanent deposit with the Burndy Library. The collection had been assembled by Roger Babson, founder of Babson College in Wellesley, Massachusetts, and was previously housed at the College. In 1999, the addition of the 7,000-volume Volterra Collection from Italy increased the Burndy Library collection by more than a third.

In 2004 MIT decided not to renew its affiliation, and the Dibner family began looking for a new location to house the collection. Leading candidates for the new location included Pittsburgh, Johns Hopkins University, Indiana University Bloomington, and Philadelphia. David Dibner died unexpectedly in 2005. The Dibner Institute closed in 2006. The Dibner Institute's former building was demolished in early 2007 to make way for new buildings for the MIT Sloan School of Management. The Dibner name remains at MIT, in the named chair Frances and David Dibner Professorship of the History of Engineering and Manufacturing.

== Move of the library ==
The Burndy Library and associated collections were transferred to The Huntington Library in San Marino, California, which now offers a Dibner History of Science Program to fund fellowships, a lecture series and annual conference. The acquisition of the Burndy Library (by then numbering 67,000 volumes) transformed the Huntington Library's collections in the history of science and technology into one of the world's largest in that field.

From 2008–2020, the Huntington housed a permanent exhibition, Beautiful Science: Ideas that Changed the World, in the 2,800-square-foot (260 m^{2}) Dibner Hall of the History of Science. This exhibition displayed approximately 150 books, manuscripts, photographs and objects from both the Burndy Library and the Huntington's non-Burndy holdings in the history of science and medicine, as well as 400 antique light bulbs.

== See also ==
- Wikipedia:Portraits from the Dibner Library of the History of Science and Technology
