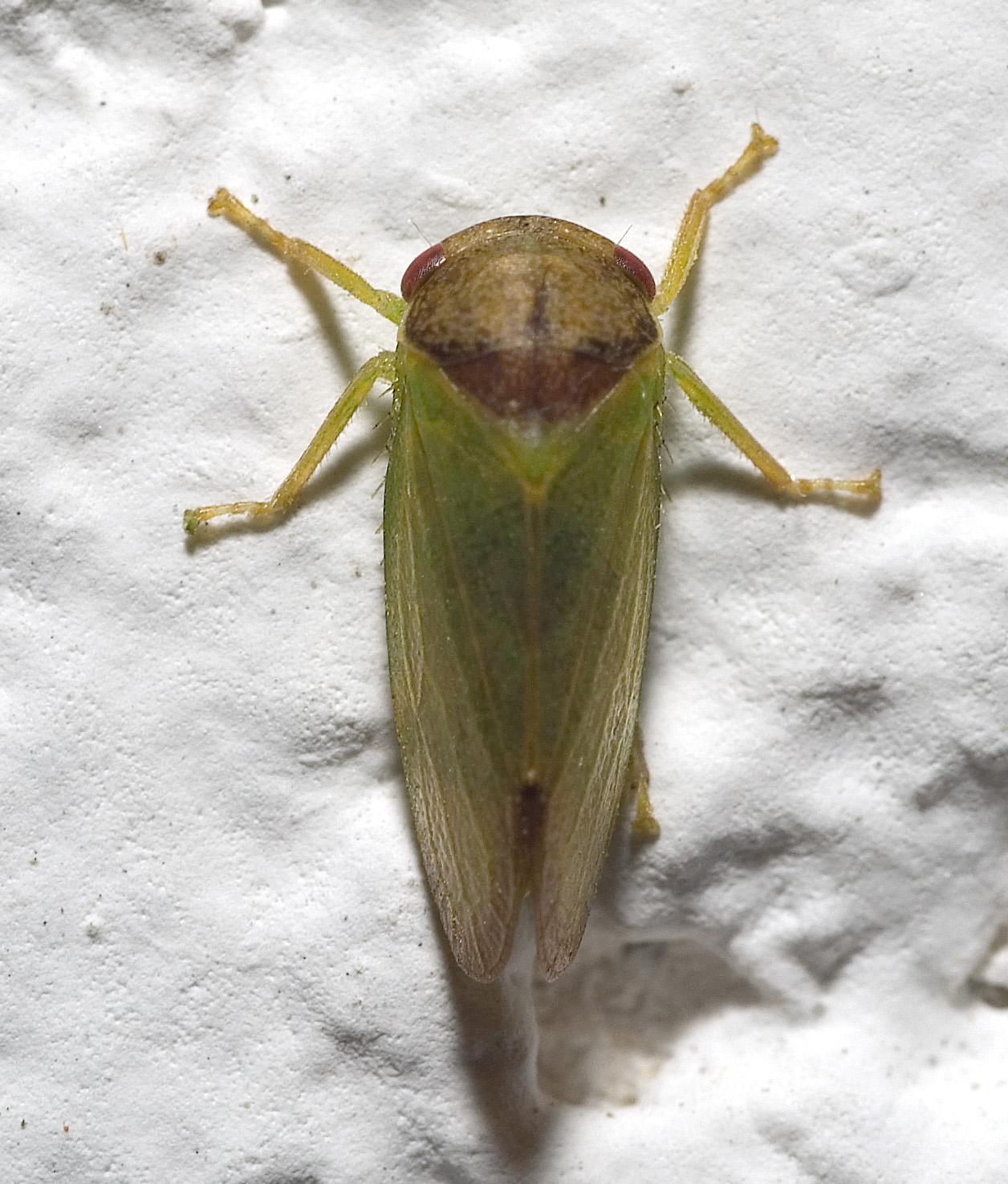
- Iassus lanio

Scientific classification
- Domain: Eukaryota
- Kingdom: Animalia
- Phylum: Arthropoda
- Class: Insecta
- Order: Hemiptera
- Suborder: Auchenorrhyncha
- Superfamily: Membracoidea
- Family: Cicadellidae
- Subfamily: Iassinae; Walker, 1870

= Iassinae =

Subfamily of leafhoppers

Iassinae is a subfamily of leafhoppers in the family Cicadellidae.

== Tribes and selected genera ==
=== Batracomorphini ===
Authority: Krishnankutty, Dietrich, Dai & Siddappaji, 2016

- Batracomorphus Lewis, 1834

=== Bythoniini ===
Authority: Linnavuori, 1959 - monotypic

- Bythonia Oman, 1938

=== Gyponini ===
Authority: Stål, 1870

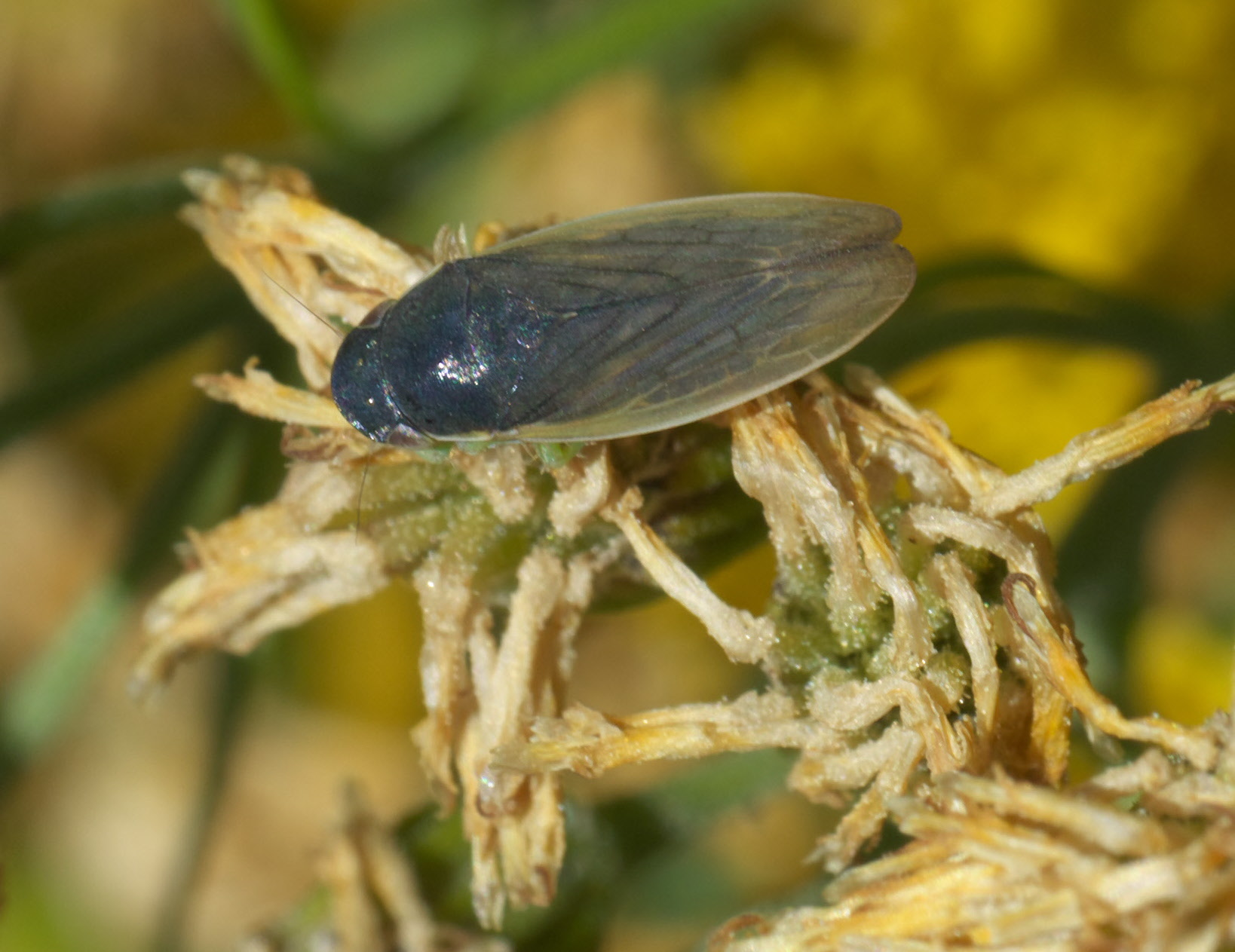
Gypona contana

- Gypona Germar, 1821
- Gyponana Ball, 1920
- Polana DeLong, 1942
- Ponana Ball, 1920
- Rugosana DeLong, 1942

(over 50 additional genera)

=== Hoplojassini ===
Authority: Krishnankutty, Dietrich, Dai & Siddappaji, 2016

=== Hyalojassini ===
Authority: Evans, 1972

- Absheta Blocker, 1979
- Aztrania Blocker, 1979
- Baldriga Blocker, 1979
- Bertawolia Blocker, 1979
- Betawala Blocker, 1979
- Comanopa Blocker, 1979
- Coriojassus Evans, 1972
- Daveyoungana Blocker & Webb, 1992
- Decliviassus Dai, Dietrich & Zhang, 2015
- Derakandra Blocker, 1979
- Donleva Blocker, 1979
- Gargaropsis Fowler, 1896
- Garlica Blocker, 1976
- Gehundra Blocker, 1976
- Goblinaja Kramer, 1965
- Grunchia Kramer, 1963
- Hyalojassus Evans, 1972
- Jivena Blocker, 1976
- Julipopa Blocker, 1979
- Kanchanaburiassus Dai, Dietrich & Zhang, 2015
- Lamelliassus Dai, Dietrich & Zhang, 2015
- Maranata Blocker, 1979
- Mogenola Blocker, 1979
- Momoria Blocker, 1979^{c g b}
- Neotrocnada Krishnankutty & Dietrich, 2012
- Penestragania Beamer & Lawson, 1945^{c g b}
- Platyhynna Berg, 1884
- Redaprata Blocker, 1979
- Siamiassus Dai, Dietrich & Zhang, 2015
- Siniassus Dai, Dietrich & Zhang, 2015
- Stragania Stal, 1862^{i c g b}
- Torenadoga Blocker, 1979
- Trocniassus Dai, Dietrich & Zhang, 2015
- Webaskola Blocker, 1979

=== Iassini ===
Authority: Walker, 1870

- Acacioiassus Linnavuori & Quartau, 1975
- Iassus Fabricius, 1803^{c g b}

=== Krisnini ===
Authority: Evans, 1947

- Gessius Distant, 1908
- Krisna Kirkaldy, 1900
- Parakrisna Cai & He, 2001

=== Lipokrisnini ===
Authority: Krishnankutty, Dietrich, Dai & Siddappaji, 2016

=== Platyjassini ===
Authority: Evans, 1953

=== Reuplemmelini ===
Authority: Evans, 1966

- Aloplemmeles Evans, 1966
- Reuplemmeles Evans, 1966
- Siderojassus Evans, 1972

=== Selenomorphini ===
Authority: Evans, 1974

- Pachyopsis Uhler, 1877

=== Trocnadini ===
Authority: Evans, 1947

- Thalattoscopus Kirkaldy, 1905
- Trocnada Walker, 1858
- Trocnadella Singh-Pruthi, 1930
