= Gessius =

Gessius, Gessios, Gesios or Gesius may refer to:

- Gessius, a genus of leafhoppers
- Gessius Florus, Roman procurator of Judea (64–66)
- Gessius (praetorian prefect) (floruit 420–443), Roman official
- Gessius of Petra (floruit 480s–530s), physician
