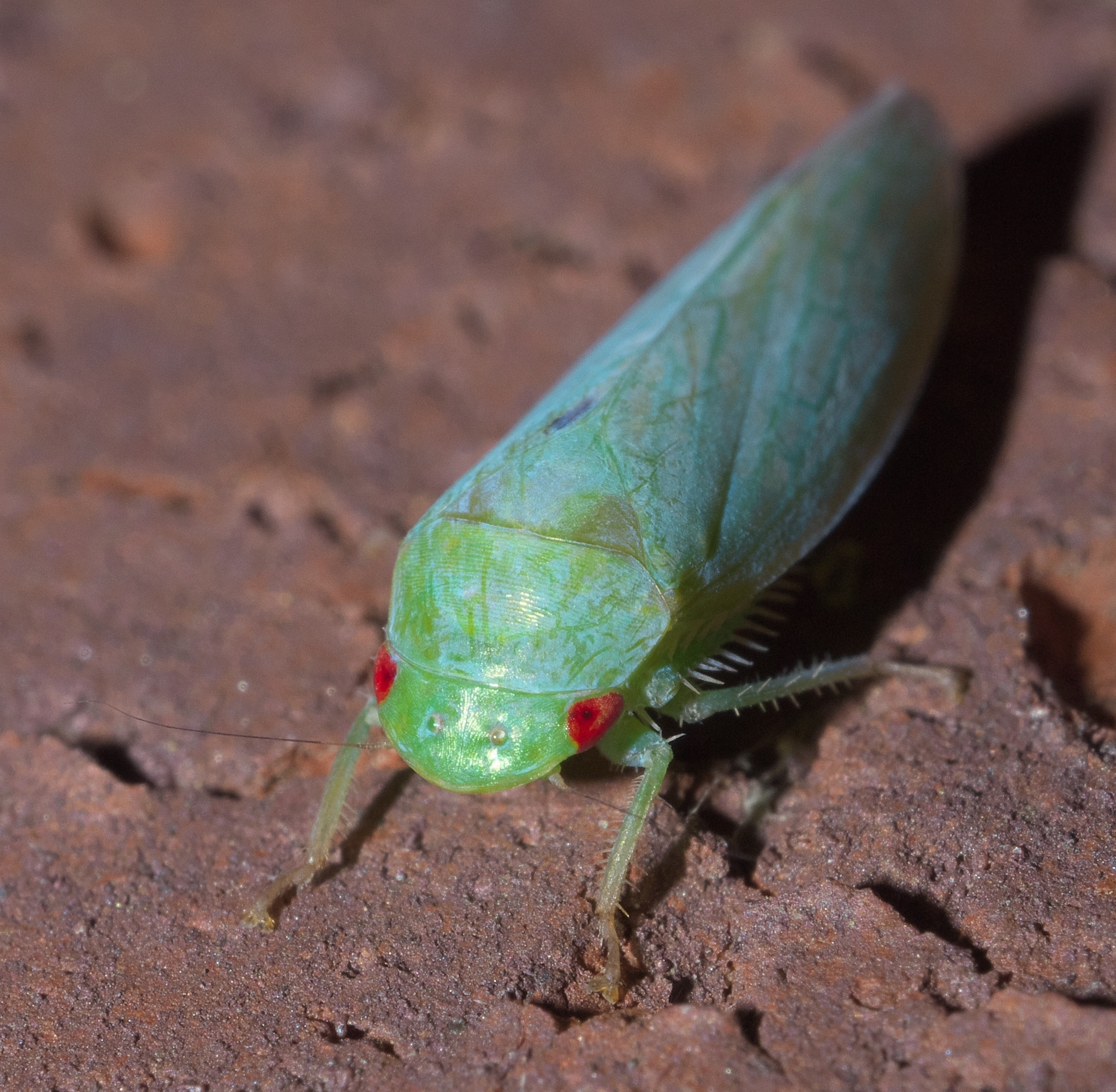
- Gyponana

Scientific classification
- Kingdom: Animalia
- Phylum: Arthropoda
- Clade: Pancrustacea
- Class: Insecta
- Order: Hemiptera
- Suborder: Auchenorrhyncha
- Family: Cicadellidae
- Subfamily: Iassinae
- Tribe: Gyponini
- Genus: Gyponana; Ball, 1920

Type species
- Gyponana octolineata Say, 1825

Subgenera
- Clovana; Gyponana; Pandara; Sternana

= Gyponana =

Genus of leafhoppers

Gyponana is a genus of leafhoppers in the family Cicadellidae found mainly in North America. There are at least 90 described species in Gyponana, but most are difficult to identify based on external characteristics.

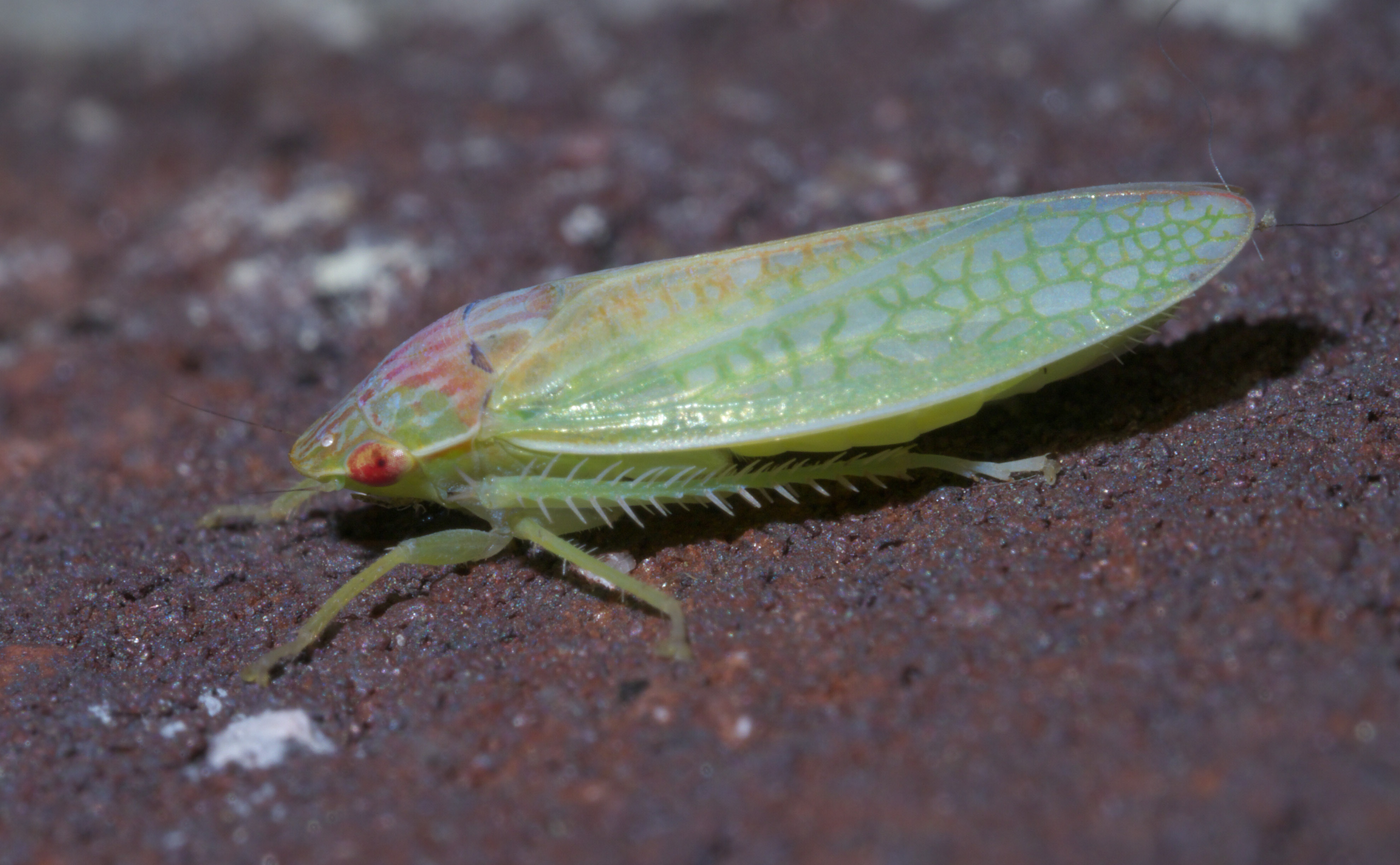
Gyponana octolineata

Species are usually green in appearance, sometimes with a blue tint, but some species have fully- and partially-pink forms.

== Distribution ==
This genus is found mostly throughout North and South America. It's very diverse throughout the United States, despite some species being morphologically identical. The genus has potentially been introduced to Europe and has been recorded in Borneo.

== Subgenera and Species ==
There are four subgenera of Gyponana. All but one are monospecific. Rugosana was once considered a subgenus of Gyponana, but was elevated to the status of genus after DNA barcode testing provided greater insight into its lineage.

=== Subgenus Clovana ===
A single species found in the southwestern United States of America.

- Gyponana omani DeLong, 1942

=== Subgenus Gyponana ===
By far the largest subgenus, containing the majority of the species in the genus.

- Gyponana acia DeLong, 1942
- Gyponana aculeata DeLong, 1942
- Gyponana amara DeLong, 1942
- Gyponana ambita DeLong, 1942
- Gyponana alternata DeLong, 1983
- Gyponana ambita DeLong & Freytag, 1964
- Gyponana ampla DeLong & Freytag, 1964
- Gyponana angulata (Spangberg, 1878)
- Gyponana angustana DeLong, 1983
- Gyponana apicata DeLong & Freytag, 1964
- Gyponana ara DeLong & Freytag, 1964
- Gyponana attenuens Hamilton, 1982
- Gyponana avara DeLong, 1942
- Gyponana bernardina DeLong, 1984
- Gyponana bocasa DeLong & Wolda, 1984
- Gyponana bocasana DeLong & Wolda, 1984
- Gyponana boquetea DeLong & Wolda, 1982
- Gyponana brevidens DeLong & Freytag, 1964
- Gyponana brevispina DeLong & Freytag, 1964
- Gyponana brevita DeLong, 1942
- Gyponana cacumina DeLong, 1942
- Gyponana caduca DeLong & Freytag, 1964
- Gyponana cana Burmeister, 1839
- Gyponana chiricana DeLong & Wolda, 1984
- Gyponana chiriquea DeLong & Wolda, 1982
- Gyponana colorada DeLong & Wolda, 1984
- Gyponana crenata de Conconi, 1972
- Gyponana cunea DeLong, 1942
- Gyponana curvata DeLong & Freytag, 1964
- Gyponana delicata Fowler, 1903
- Gyponana dentata de Conconi, 1972
- Gyponana desa DeLong, 1942
- Gyponana designata DeLong & Freytag, 1964
- Gyponana elongata Ball, 1935
- Gyponana expanda DeLong, 1942
- Gyponana extenda DeLong, 1942
- Gyponana fastiga DeLong, 1942
- Gyponana fimbriata DeLong, 1942
- Gyponana flavilineata Fitch, 1851
- Gyponana fortuna DeLong & Wolda, 1982
- Gyponana fructa DeLong & Freytag, 1964
- Gyponana geminata (Osborn, 1905)
- Gyponana germari (Stal, 1864)
- Gyponana gibbera DeLong, 1942
- Gyponana gladia DeLong, 1942
- Gyponana impeta DeLong & Wolda, 1982
- Gyponana laminella DeLong, 1983
- Gyponana librata DeLong, 1942
- Gyponana longula DeLong & Freytag, 1964
- Gyponana luisa DeLong, 1984
- Gyponana luxuria DeLong, 1983
- Gyponana mali DeLong, 1942
- Gyponana marita DeLong & Freytag, 1964
- Gyponana minuta DeLong, 1983
- Gyponana morosita DeLong, 1942
- Gyponana octolineata Say, 1825
- Gyponana offula DeLong, 1942
- Gyponana ortha DeLong, 1942
- Gyponana palma DeLong, 1942
- Gyponana palmula DeLong & Freytag, 1964
- Gyponana parallela DeLong, 1942
- Gyponana penna DeLong & Freytag, 1964
- Gyponana pingua DeLong, 1942
- Gyponana praelonga DeLong, 1942
- Gyponana procera DeLong, 1942
- Gyponana protenta DeLong, 1942
- Gyponana quebecensis (Provancher, 1872)
- Gyponana redita DeLong & Freytag, 1964
- Gyponana rubralineata DeLong & Freytag, 1972
- Gyponana salsa DeLong, 1942
- Gyponana serrula DeLong & Freytag, 1964
- Gyponana serrulata de Conconi, 1972
- Gyponana sincera DeLong & Freytag, 1964
- Gyponana sonora Hamilton, 1982
- Gyponana striata (Burmeister, 1839)
- Gyponana subvirida DeLong & Freytag, 1964
- Gyponana suda DeLong, 1984
- Gyponana tenella Spångberg, 1878
- Gyponana torqua DeLong, 1983
- Gyponana toxotes Hamilton, 1982
- Gyponana trigona DeLong, 1942
- Gyponana trirama DeLong & Freytag, 1964
- Gyponana tubera DeLong, 1942
- Gyponana unicolor Stål, 1942
- Gyponana vasta DeLong, 1942
- Gyponana vincula DeLong, 1942

=== Subgenus Pandara ===
A single species.

- Gyponana eleganta DeLong & Freytag, 1972

=== Subgenus Sternana ===
A single species.

- Gyponana tenuis DeLong & Freytag, 1964

=== Incertae sedis ===
- Gyponana secunda Freytag & DeLong, 1975
