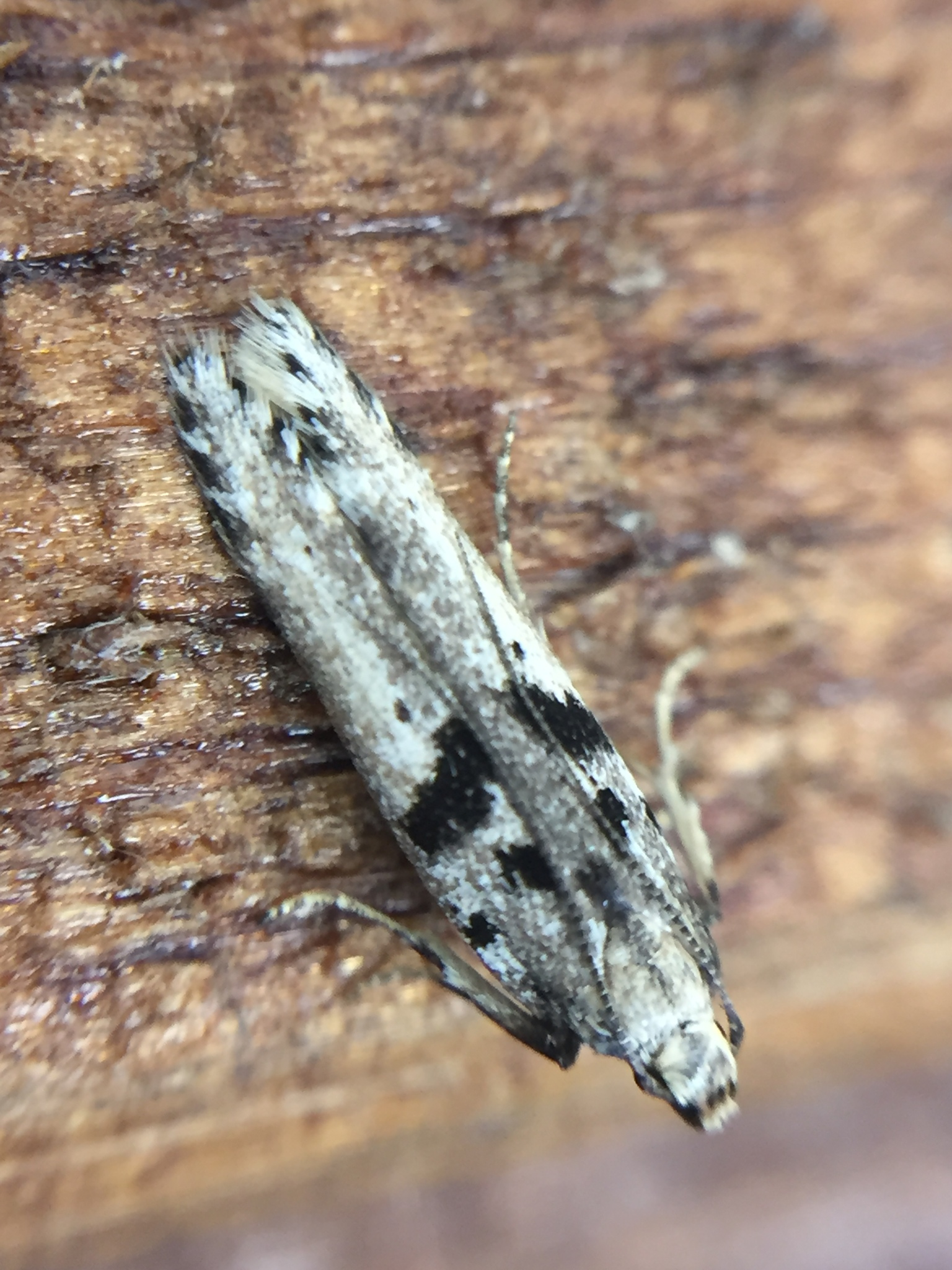

Scientific classification
- Kingdom: Animalia
- Phylum: Arthropoda
- Clade: Pancrustacea
- Class: Insecta
- Order: Lepidoptera
- Family: Gelechiidae
- Genus: Aristotelia
- Species: A. paradesma

Binomial name
- Aristotelia paradesma (Meyrick, 1885)

Synonyms
- Tsochasta paradesma Meyrick, 1885; Isochasta paradesma Meyrick, 1886

= Aristotelia paradesma =

Species of moth endemic to New Zealand

Aristotelia paradesma is a moth of the family Gelechiidae. It was described by Edward Meyrick in 1885 and is endemic to New Zealand. This species has been observed on both the North and South Islands. The larvae feed on Coprosma species creating and living in stem galls. The adults are on the wing from November to March and are attracted to light.

== Taxonomy ==
This species was first described by Edward Meyrick in 1885 and named Tsochasta paradesma. In 1886 Meyrick described this species in greater detail and corrected the previous misspelling of the genus name to Isochasta. In 1915 Meyrick placed this species within the genus Aristotelia. In 1928 George Hudson discussed and illustrated this species under the name Aristotelia paradesma. The year before Alfred Philpott discussed and illustrated the male genitalia of this species. The male holotype specimen is held at the Natural History Museum, London.

== Description ==
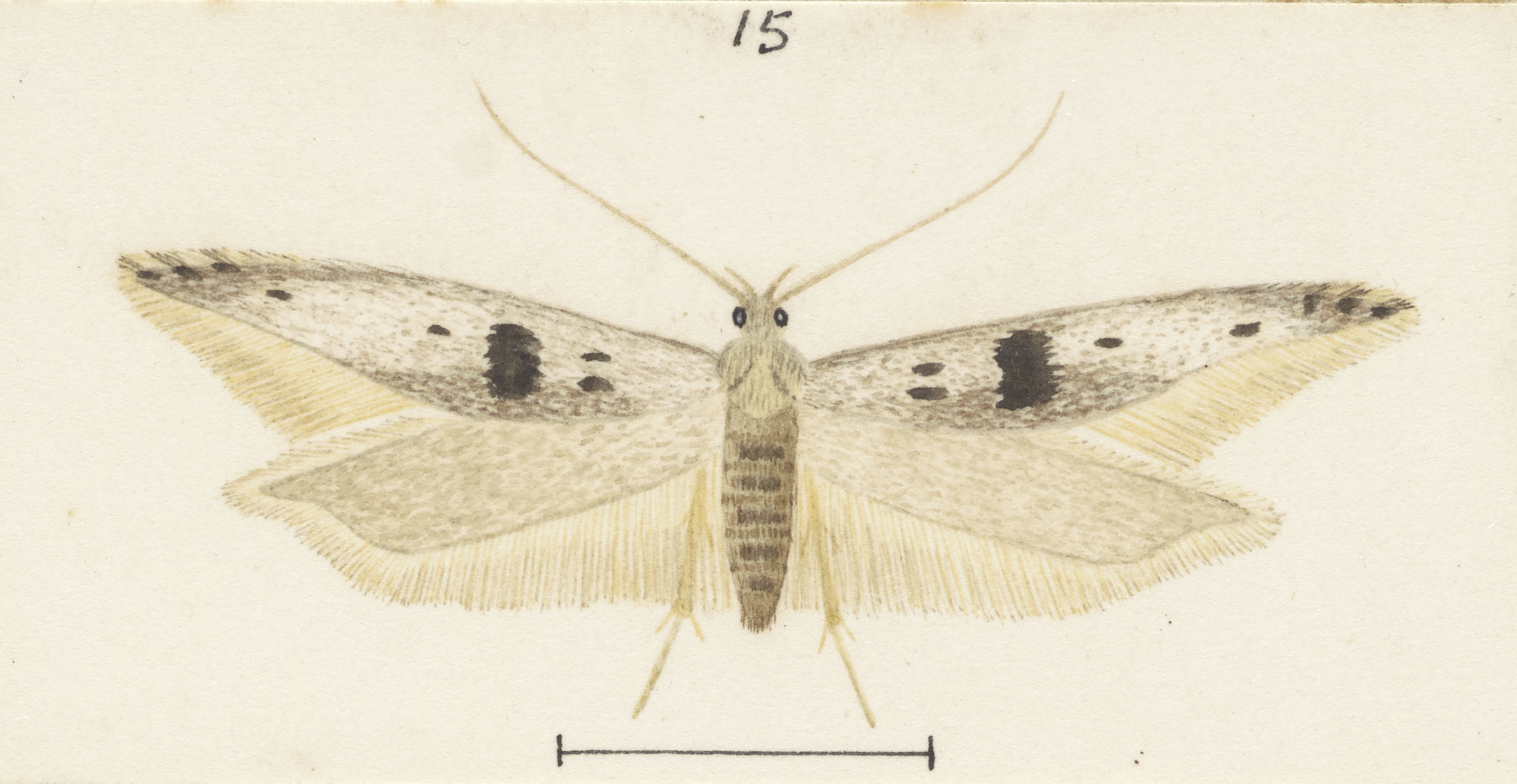
Illustration by George Hudson.

The wingspan is about 17 mm. The forewings are whitish, irregularly irrorated (sprinkled) with light grey and with a grey suffusion along the inner margin from the base to the anal angle. There is a small blackish spot on the costa almost at the base and a black dot beneath the costa at one-fifth, and a second larger one beneath it on the fold. A thick blackish transverse somewhat oblique streak is found at one-third, reaching from beneath the costa to the fold, the margins irregular. There are also two black dots nearly longitudinally placed in the middle of the disc, and a third in the disc at three-fourths. The hindwings are grey.

== Distribution ==
This species is endemic to New Zealand and has been observed in both the North and South Islands. Both Hudson and T. H Davies were of the opinion that this species was rare but more recently this species has been regarded as being relatively common.

== Behaviour ==
Adults of this species are on the wing from November to March. They are attracted to light and have been collected via light trapping.

== Hosts ==
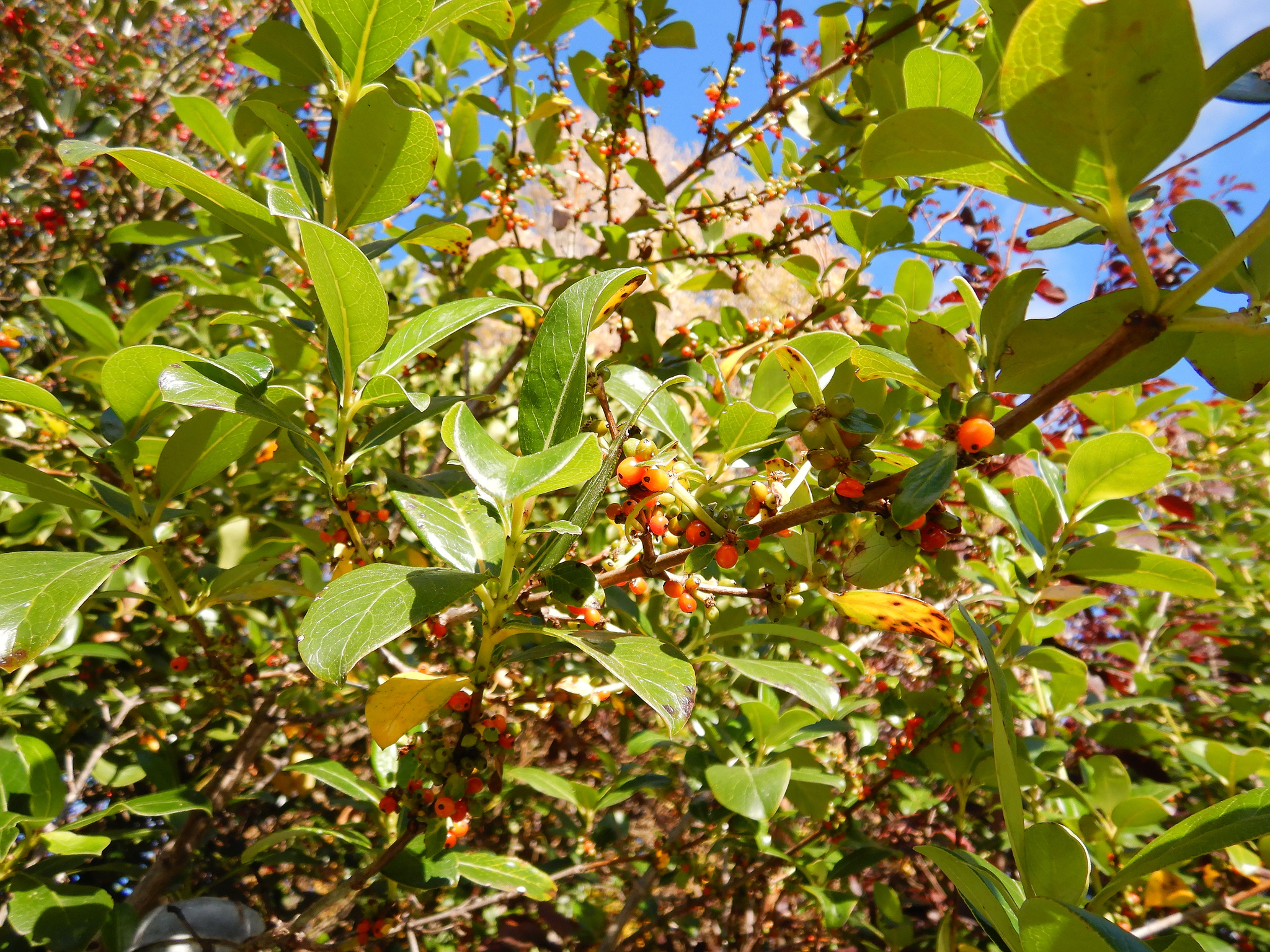
Larval host Coprosma robusta

The larvae of A. paradesma live in stem galls in Coprosma species. They have been shown to be associated with Coprosma robusta.
