= Krisna =

Scientific classification
- Kingdom: Animalia
- Phylum: Arthropoda
- Clade: Pancrustacea
- Class: Insecta
- Order: Hemiptera
- Suborder: Auchenorrhyncha
- Family: Cicadellidae
- Subfamily: Iassinae
- Tribe: Krisnini
- Genus: Krisna; Kirkaldy, 1900

Diversity
- over 30 species

Synonyms
- Siva Spinola, 1850 (Preocc.)

Genus of leafhoppers

Krisna is a genus of leafhoppers in the family Cicadellidae. There are more than 30 described species in Krisna.

== Species ==
- Krisna antaea Linnavuori & Quartau, 1975
- Krisna bakeri Viraktamath, 2006
- Krisna colorata Baker, 1919
- Krisna concava Li & Wang, 1991
- Krisna daiyunensis Zhang, Zhang & Dai, 2008
- Krisna delta Viraktamath, 2006
- Krisna furcata Zhang, Zhang & Dai, 2008
- Krisna gravis (Stål, 1858)
- Krisna indicata (Walker,1858)
- Krisna kirbyi Kirkaldy, 1900
- Krisna magna Baker, 1919
- Krisna megha Viraktamath, 2006
- Krisna minima Baker, 1919
- Krisna muirii Baker, 1919
- Krisna nigrifrons Baker, 1919
- Krisna nigromarginata Cai & He, 1998
- Krisna olivacea Linnavuori, 1969
- Krisna olivascens Baker, 1919
- Krisna penangensis Baker, 1919
- Krisna raja Viraktamath, 2006
- Krisna rosea (Bierman, 1910)
- Krisna rufimarginata Cai & He, 1998
- Krisna sherwilli Distant, 1908
- Krisna simillima Baker, 1919
- Krisna straminea (Walker, 1851)
- Krisna strigicollis (Spinola, 1850)
- Krisna varia Viraktamath, 2006
- Krisna veni Viraktamath, 2006
- Krisna villiersi Linnavuori, 1969
- Krisna viraktamathae Zhang, Zhang & Dai, 2008
- Krisna viridula Li & Wang, 1991
- Krisna walayari Viraktamath, 2006
- Krisna walkeri Metcalf, 1955
