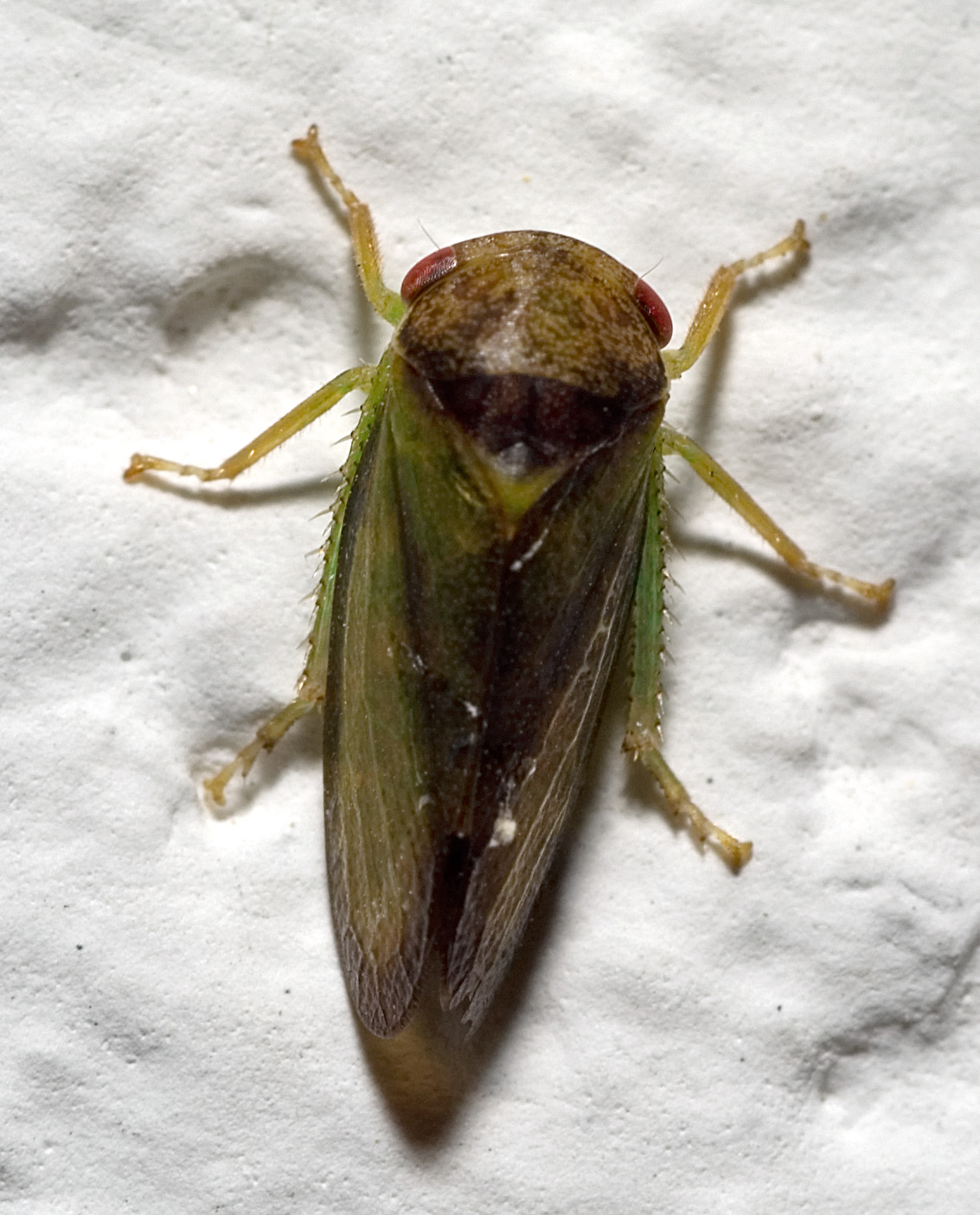
- Iassus lanio

Scientific classification
- Domain: Eukaryota
- Kingdom: Animalia
- Phylum: Arthropoda
- Class: Insecta
- Order: Hemiptera
- Suborder: Auchenorrhyncha
- Family: Cicadellidae
- Tribe: Iassini
- Genus: Iassus; Fabricius, 1803

Synonyms
- List: Iassus Fabricius, 1803 (Official List of Generic Names in Zoology, ICZN Op. 612); Jasus Megerle, 1804 (Missp.); Jassus Fallén, 1806 (Unjust. Emend.); Bythoscopus Germar, 1833; Macropsis Amyot & Serville, 1843 (Preocc.); Brythoscopus Desmarest, 1859 (Missp.); Bythroscopus Bellevoye, 1866 (Missp.); Bythoscopis Marshall, T.A., 1866 (Missp.); Blythoscopus Brodie & White, 1883 (Missp.); Bhythoscopus Jakovleff, 1891 (Missp.); Jasius Osborn, 1900 (Missp.); Bytoscopus de Carlini, 19019 (Missp.); Bythosopus Van Duzee, 1914 (Missp.); Bithoscopus Prohaska, 1923 (Missp.); Byttioscopus Bergevin, 1926 (Missp.); Janus Metcalf, 1964 (Missp.); Jassius Metcalf, 1964 (Missp.); Bythoscapus Metcalf, 1966 (Missp.); Bythosopis Metcalf, 1966 (Missp.); Bruthoscopus Auctt.(Missp.)

= Iassus (leafhopper) =

Genus of leafhoppers

Iassus is a genus of leafhoppers in the family Cicadellidae. There are more than 35 described species in Iassus, located primarily in Europe.

== Species ==
- Iassus bohemani Metcalf, 1966
- Iassus chortophilus Walker, 1851
- Iassus costalis Walker, 1870
- Iassus epirrhaena Walker, 1851
- Iassus extremus Walker, 1852
- Iassus flavipes Motschulsky, 1859
- Iassus hyalinus Palisot de Beauvois, 1820
- Iassus hypaulacius Walker, 1851
- Iassus infectoriae Abdul-Nour, 1998
- Iassus iziaslavi Anufriev, 1977
- Iassus lanio (Linnaeus, 1761)
- Iassus lateralis Matsumura, 1905
- Iassus leucospilus Walker, 1851
- Iassus lineola Walker, 1858
- Iassus lunatus Statz, 1950
- Iassus melanoneurus Heer, 1853
- Iassus mirabilis Orosz, 1979
- Iassus multisparsus Jacobi, 1917
- Iassus muscarius Heer, 1853
- Iassus nacia Walker, 1851
- Iassus osborni Metcalf, 1966
- Iassus pedematia Walker, 1851
- Iassus pellucidus Osborn, 1934
- Iassus peltophlyctis Walker, 1851
- Iassus prostictops Walker, 1851
- Iassus pseudocerris Abdul-Nour, 1998
- Iassus pulcher Piton, 1940
- Iassus ranjiti Ghosh, 1974
- Iassus robustus Statz, 1950
- Iassus scutellaris Fieber, 1868
- Iassus sepultus Meunier, 1920
- Iassus sujfunus Anufriev, 1971
- Iassus tetrops Jacobi, 1917
- Iassus ulmi Kusnezov, 1929
- Iassus xantholues Walker, 1851
- Iassus zinnevia Walker, 1851
- †Iassus lapidescens Scudder, 1877
