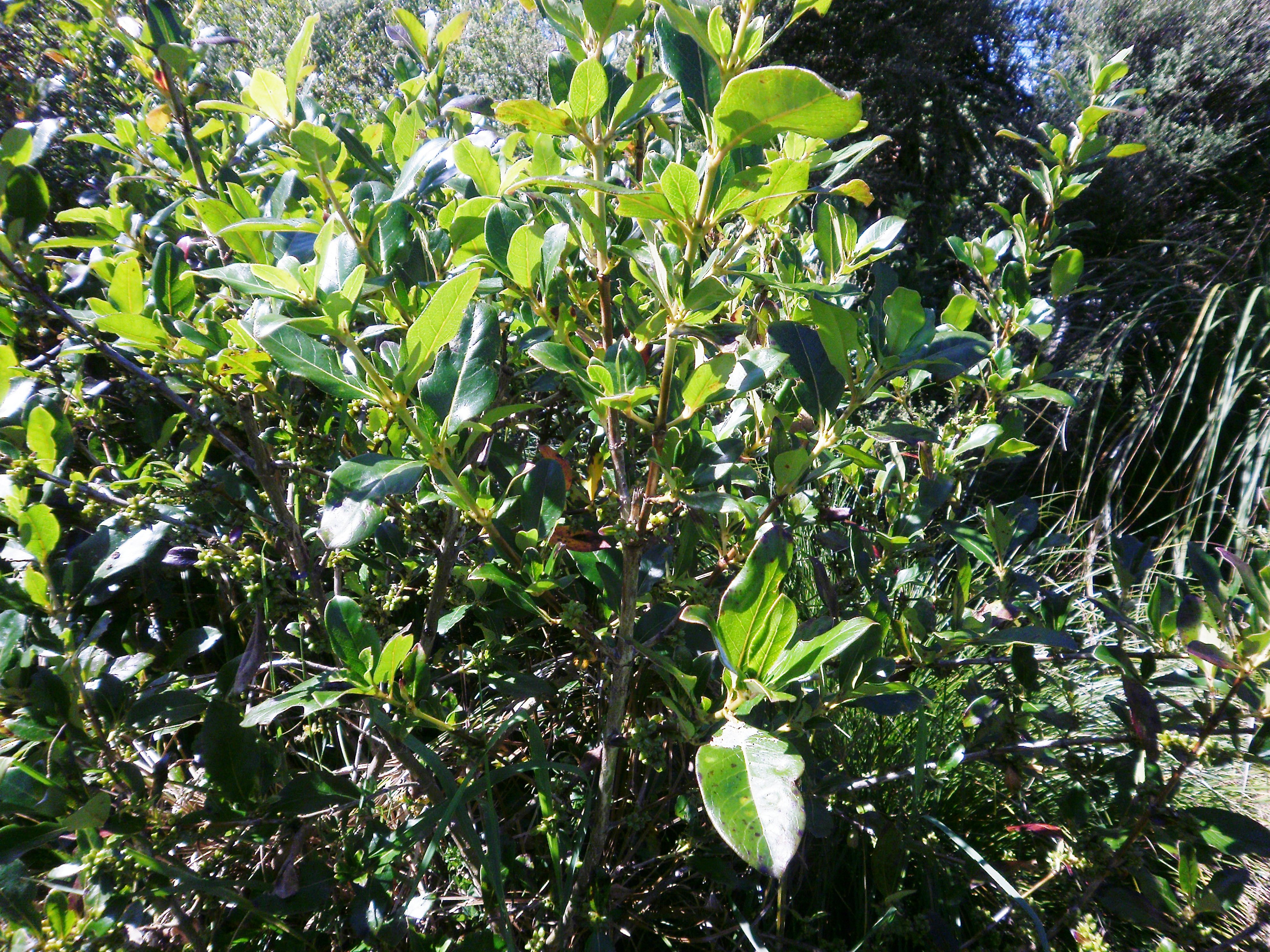

Scientific classification
- Kingdom: Plantae
- Clade: Tracheophytes
- Clade: Angiosperms
- Clade: Eudicots
- Clade: Asterids
- Order: Gentianales
- Family: Rubiaceae
- Genus: Coprosma
- Species: C. robusta

Binomial name
- Coprosma robusta Raoul

= Coprosma robusta =

Species of tree

Coprosma robusta, commonly known as karamū, is a flowering plant in the family Rubiaceae that is endemic to New Zealand. It can survive in many climates, but is most commonly found in coastal areas, lowland forests, or shrublands. Karamū can grow to be around 6 meters (20 feet) tall, and grow leaves up to 12 centimeters (4.7 inches) long. Karamū is used for a variety of purposes in human culture. The fruit that karamū produces can be eaten, and the shoots of karamū are sometimes used for medical purposes.

== Description ==
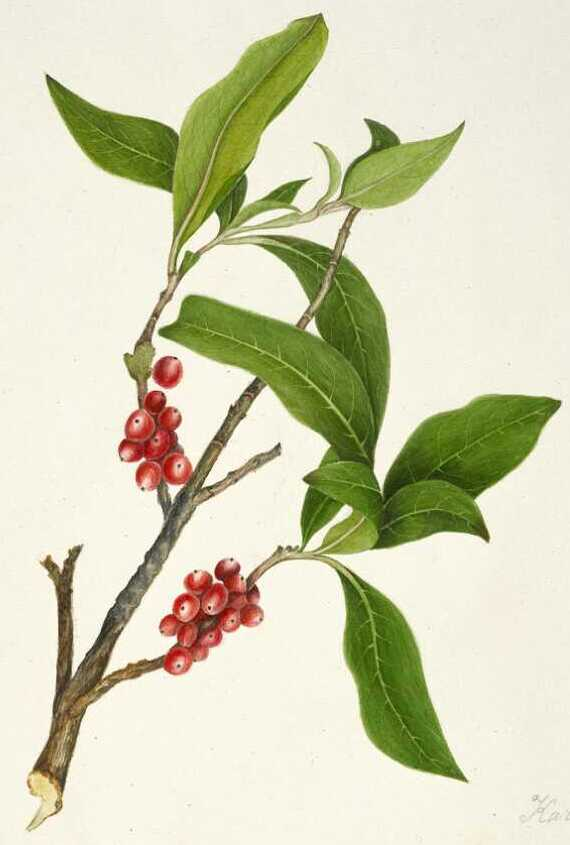
1842 botanical illustration by Martha King of karamū in fruit

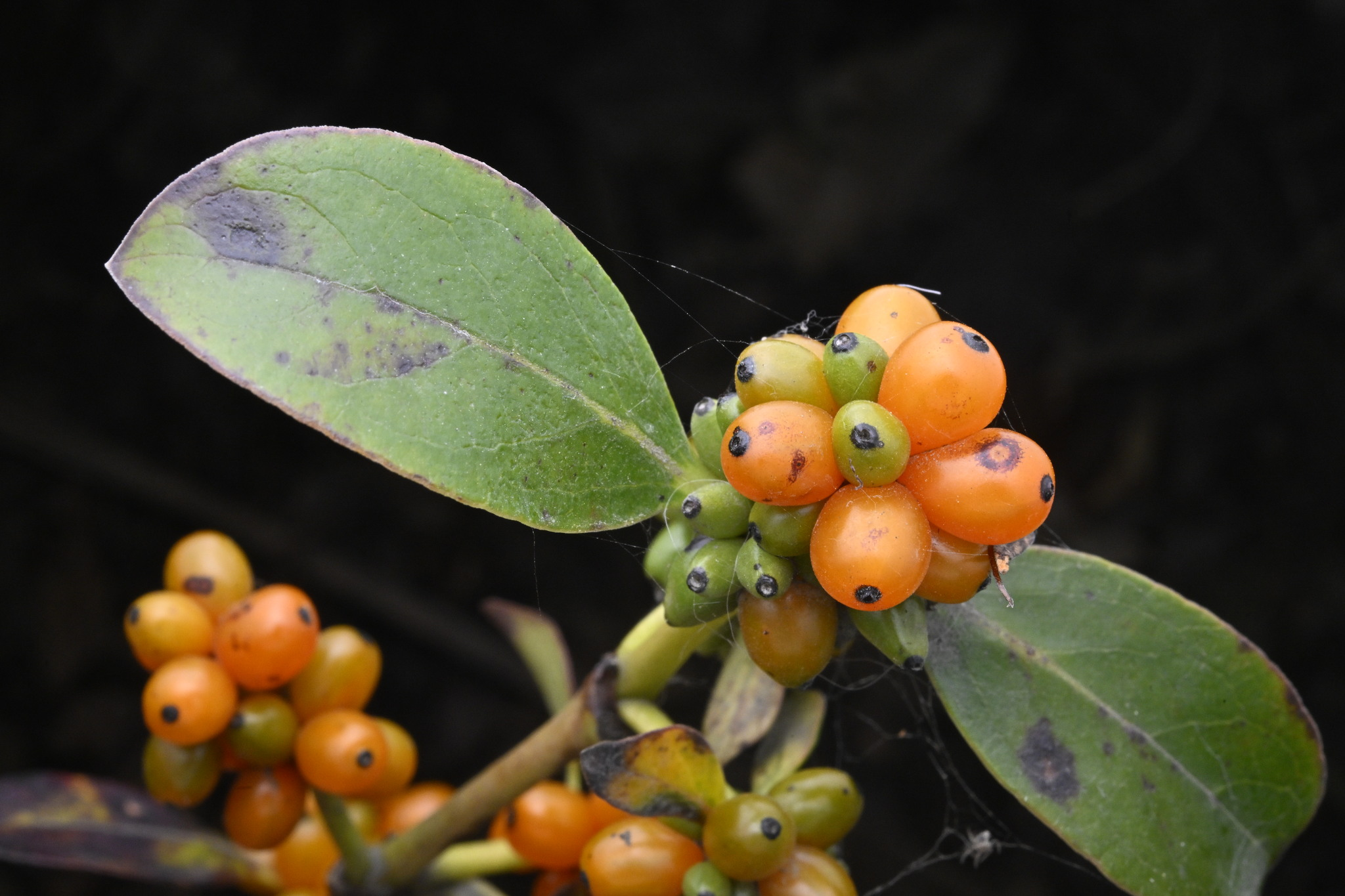
Karamū leaves and berries

Karamū is a large bushy shrub that grows up to 6 meters (20 feet) tall. Branches are stout with no hair. Domatia (small holes on the back of the leaf at the intersection of veins) and stipules are significant characteristic features of Coprosmas. Karamū stipules are black, hairless and obtuse with slightly serrated margin that are united at the base

=== Leaves ===
The glossy leaves of karamū range from 5 to 12 centimeters (2.0 to 4.7 inches) long, with elliptic-oblong shape and acute or obtuse leaf apex and with obvious veins. Leaves are dark green on the blade and light green on the back, are thick, and the midrib is not raised on the upper surface.

=== Flowers ===
Flowers are small and white, axillary, dense, have four lobes and have a different appearance in male and females. Male flowers are dense, glomerules with a campanulate shaped corolla and have four stamens; female flowers are compound with a tubular shaped corolla. Stigmata are obvious. The best flowering period is between August and September.

=== Fruit ===
Fruit are often dark orange-red to red, oblong to narrow ovate drupes. The best fruiting period is between April and May.

== Taxonomy ==
The species was one of the first Coprosma species that were collected by Joseph Banks during Cook's voyage to New Zealand, who used the name Pelaphia lata in his notes. The species was first formally described by French naval surgeon Étienne Raoul in 1844.

== Etymology ==
The species epithet robusta means strong or sturdy. The Māori language name karamū has unclear etymological origins, but may be linked to the word kakara (scent).

== Distribution and habitat ==
=== Natural global range ===
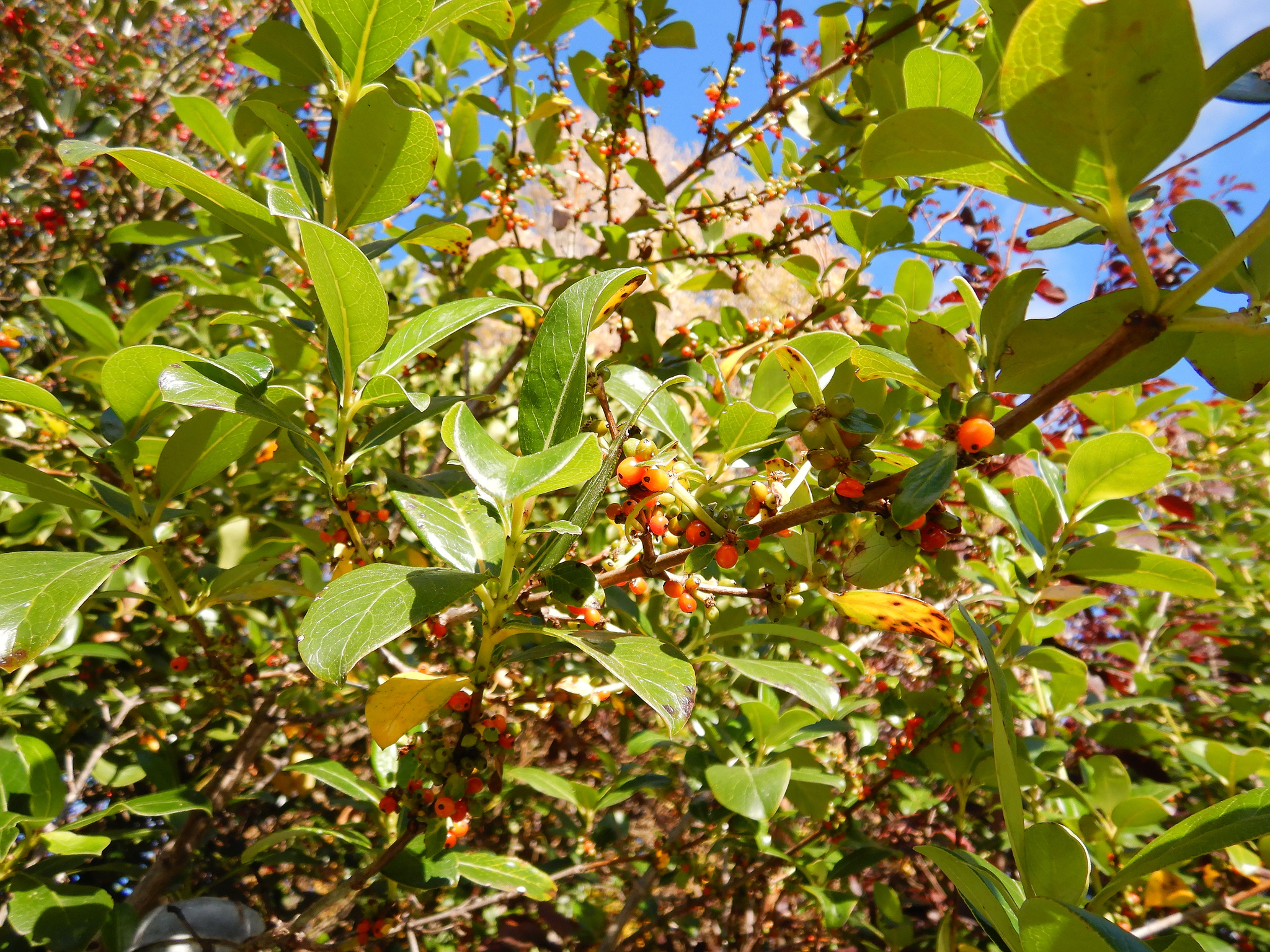
Coprosma robusta in Christchurch, New Zealand

Karamū is endemic to New Zealand. However, it is gradually becoming naturalised in areas of the south-east coast of Australia such as Victoria and Tasmania and has been rated as a weed threat there.

=== New Zealand range ===
It is widely distributed across New Zealand in both the North and South Islands. On the Chatham Islands between Waitangi and Owenga, there is a small area where karamū has become naturalised. They can often be observed naturally in lowland forest. Judging from the distribution map on New Zealand Plant Observation, the distribution of karamū increases with the differentiation in lower altitude which means more karamū in the North Island.

In Canterbury, karamū is found on Banks Peninsula in fragments of regenerating native bush and bush remnants. Additionally it is also found in forest margins and edges of the montane and lowland forests in the southern alps at the start of the Canterbury plains. Karamū can also be found in the urban environment of many Christchurch city green spaces, such as Riccarton Bush.

=== Habitat preferences ===
Karamū can be widely found near coastal, lowland and lower montane areas. It can also grow within shrub lands and expansive areas within dense trees such as lowland forest. However, the population decreases in lowland forest such as beech and kahikatea forests. Normally karamū is a hardy plant that can adapt to infertile soils, poorly drained and exposed lands. It can also grow in a large range of altitude varying from 0 to 1,200 meters (0 to 3,937 feet) under full sun to shady, windy and frosty circumstances.

== Life cycle and phenology ==
In New Zealand the flowering season of karamū is from winter (approximately from July) to summer (ends around December). Male and female flowers are separated which is called dioecious. Seeds mature by about April and start germinating soon afterwards and doesn't leave a long lasting seed bank.

The seed is largely dispersed by birds which eat the fruit. Due to its hardy characteristics, it is easy growing from seed even on open sites. Again, as mentioned before, the best season for C. robusta's fruiting is between April and May. It would finally grow up to six meters high and will normally act as a secondary succession plant during this process.

== Ecology ==
=== Growing conditions ===
Karamū is an extremely hardy plant that can grow in a large range of environmental conditions from full sun to shady, from dry to moist, and can tolerate frost and wind. The mature fruit can endure a minimum temperature to −8 °C (18 °F) and the leaves can endure a minimum temperature −7 °C (19 °F) before they get irretrievably damaged. It grows best in a moist soil which is not too acid, although they have the ability to live in poor soils. They can also be found in coastal conditions, lowland scrub, swamps and rock associations.

Karamū is noted for its quick bushy growth and for this reason is commonly cultivated and frequently used for native bush regeneration projects.

=== Predators ===
Herbivorous mammals such as goats (Capra hircus) and deer (Cervus elaphus) have a severe impact on karamū, and hares (Lepus timidus) and rabbits (Oryctolagus cuniculus) eat the seedlings.(Brockie, 1992). Additional consumers of karamū are Batracomorphus, Batracomorphus adventitiosus, leafhoppers and Membracoidea.

=== Interactions ===
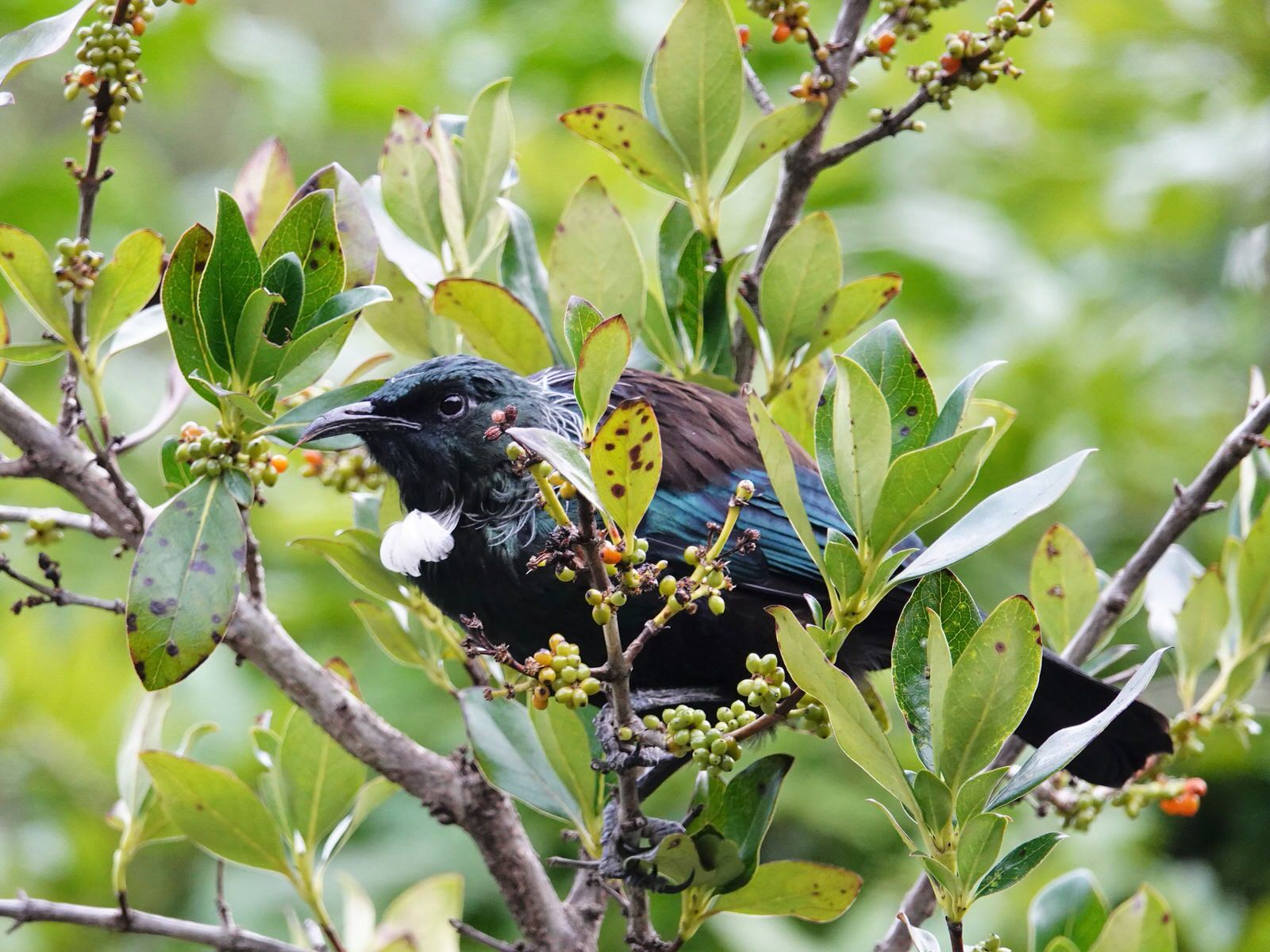
A tūī (Prosthemadera novaeseelandiae) feeding on karamū berries in Titirangi, Auckland

Birds which disperse karamū seeds include native bellbirds (Anthornis melanura) and tūī (Prosthemadera novaeseelandiae), indigenous silvereyes (Zosterops lateralis), and introduced blackbirds (Turdus merula), and song thrushes (Turdus philomelos). Seeds can be dispersed a long way and into areas of more mature forest. According to the database in Encyclopedia of Life, additional species that interact karau are Acalitus, Acalitus cottieri, Eriophyid mites, European greenfinch, and goldfinches.

Karamū and mycorrhizal fungi can make a symbiotic mutualism in roots system. Because mycorrhizal fungi can supply water and nutrients to the plant. Experiments with karamū shows its growth is assisted by the presence of mychorrhizal fungi assuming there is sufficient phosphorus in the soil.

=== Parasites ===
Karamū will sometimes act as a host plant to support other plants including podocarp, totara and yellow-wood family.

=== Sex ratios ===
In recent years, there is a report showing the sex ratio of karamū in the Riccarton Bush in Christchurch. The sex ratio of population of is female-biased with 70% of the flowering plants being female. This female-biased ratio differs from the few other counts of sex ratios in New Zealand species of Coprosma. That could be influenced by a number of factors, including the pollen and seed fecundity of the two sexes and factors affecting their sexual maturity and mortality. That is interesting because karamū is often male-biased in sex ratios. This differential survival of the sexes in long-lived species is usually attributed to differences in reproductive effort between male and female plants. In particular, the energy cost of producing ovules and fruit in female plants is greater than the cost of male flowers producing pollen. Female-biased sex ratios also occur as a consequence of differential fertilization and genetic differentiation of sex chromosomes.

== Cultural uses ==
=== Traditions ===
Karamū is often associated with spirituality in traditional Māori culture, and is often a feature of birthing ceremonies and funerary rites. Baptists used the leaves in a ceremony and green karamū branches will be held by tohunga in tohi for newly born babies.

=== Medicinal uses ===
The plant is used in traditional Rongoā medicinal practices. Juvenile shoots can be applied to release inflammation or bladder problems if boiled and then the liquid drunk. The leaves are believed by Māori to have the ability to deal with kidney troubles and bark can be and used to treat stomachache and vomiting.

=== Food ===
The mature berries of karamū are a traditional Māori food, and karamū leaves can be used to line hāngī pits to impart flavour into food. The berries have a bitter-sweet taste, and their flavour is highly variable across different individual plants.

=== Dyes ===
Karamū is rich in dying properties including alizarin and purpurin. Traditionally Māori used it to dye flax (Phormium) fibers yellow. Sometimes leaves of karamū were put on stones and dye the food and preserve them after a hāngī.

== Early European uses ==
Boiled karamū leaves were used by early European settlers in New Zealand as a substitute for tea. In 1877, Coutts Crawford investigated the use of karamū berries to create coffee.

== Gallery ==
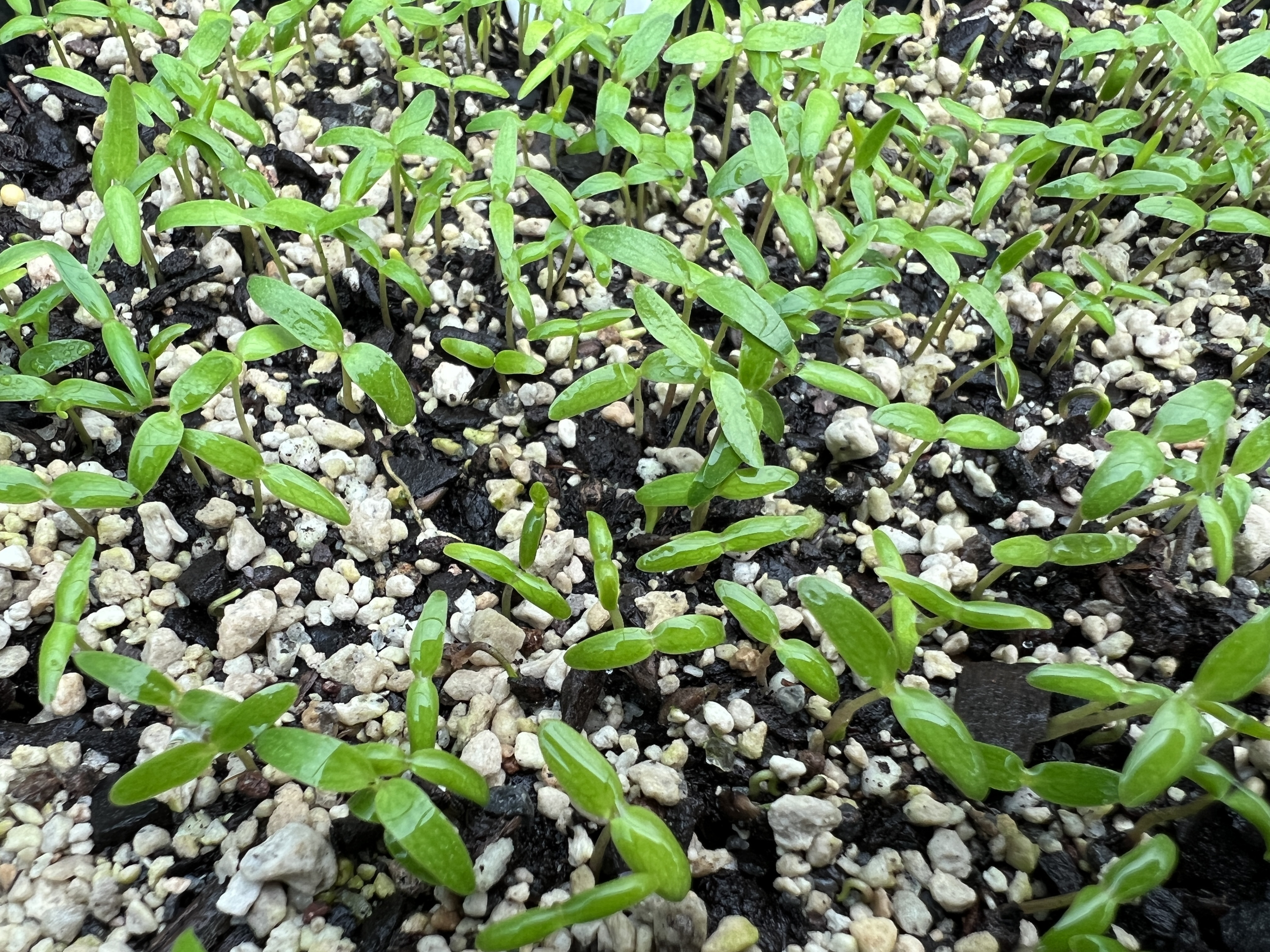
Seedlings

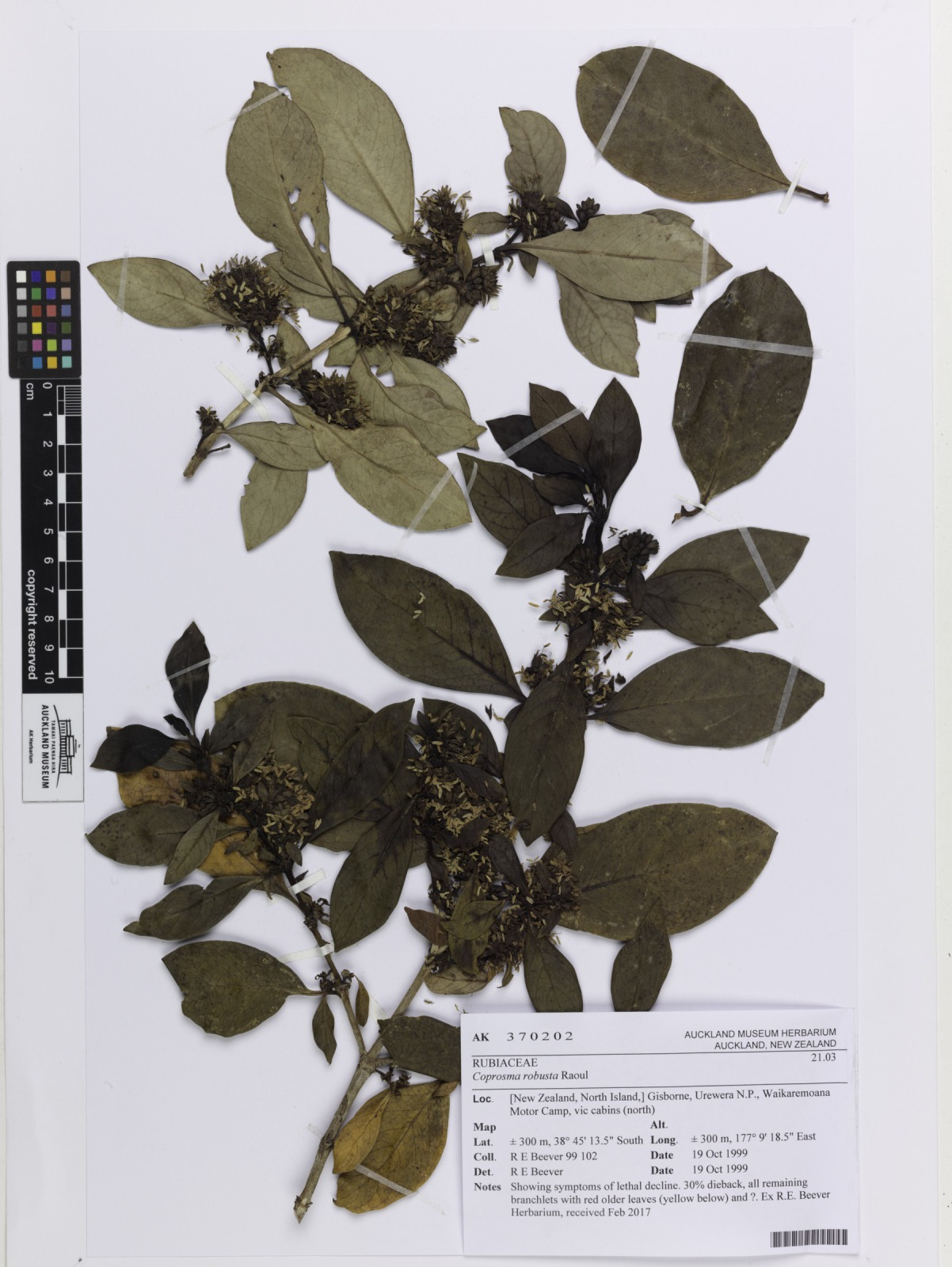
Herbarium specimen

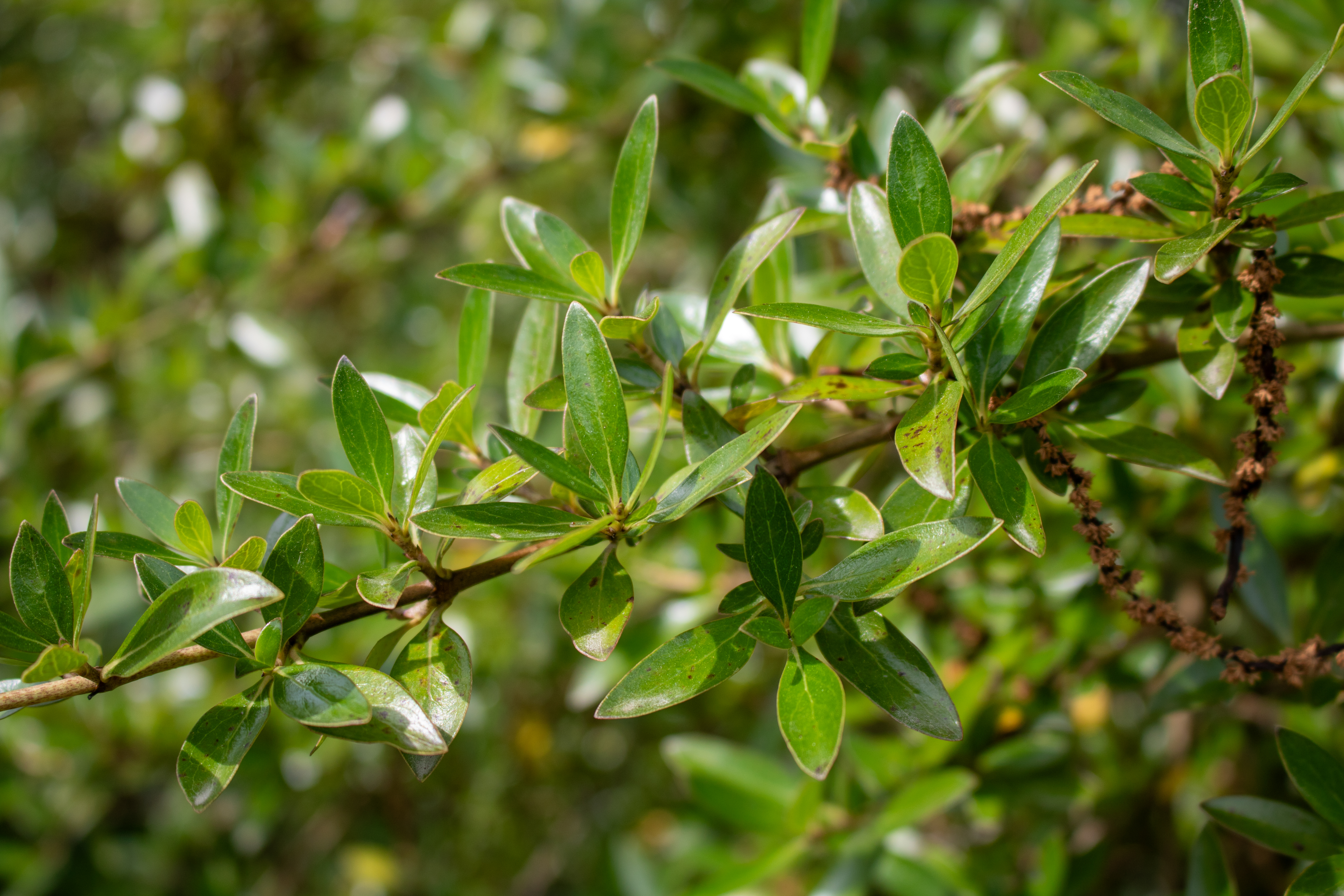
Karamū leaves

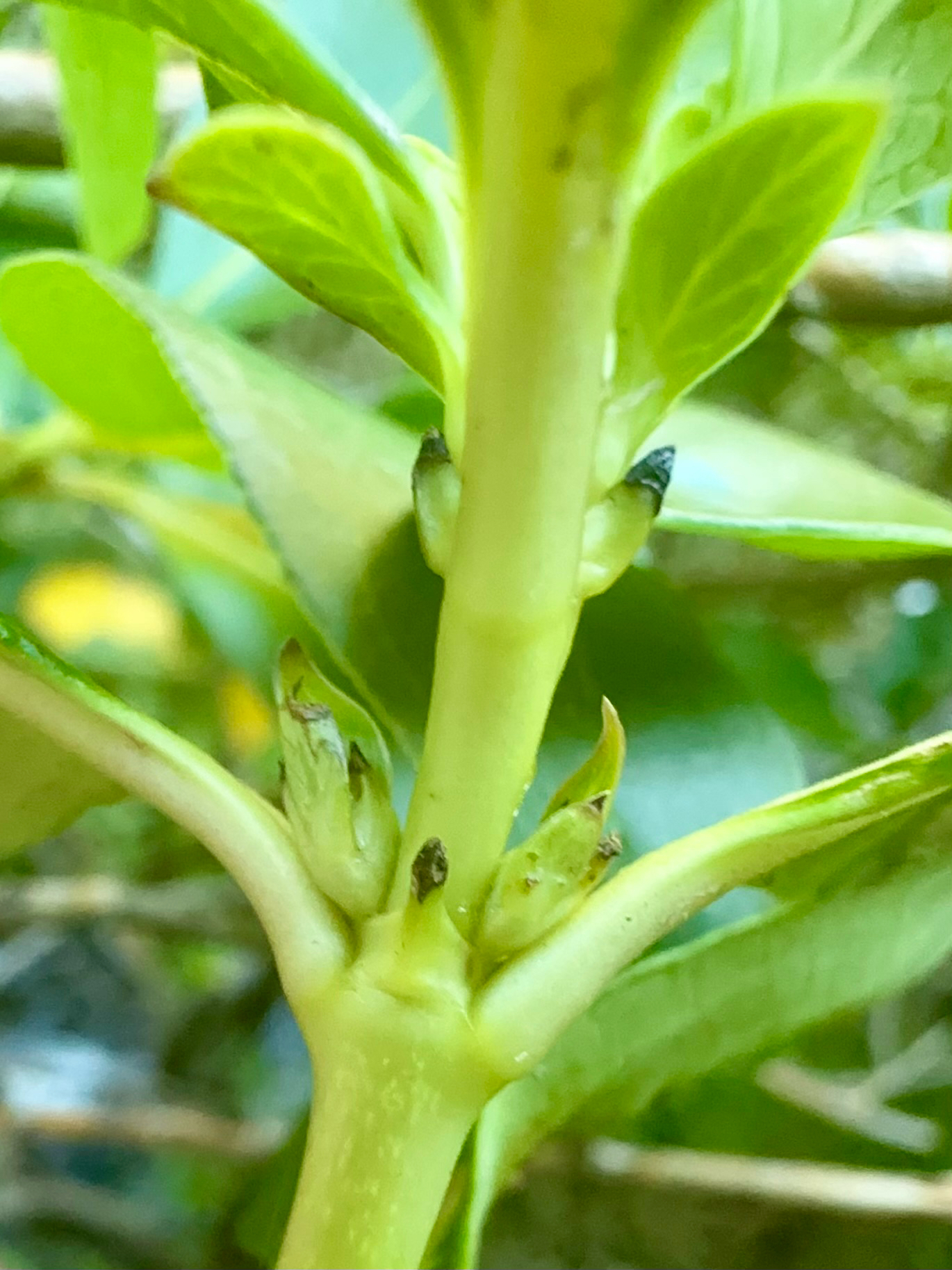
Stem and flower buds

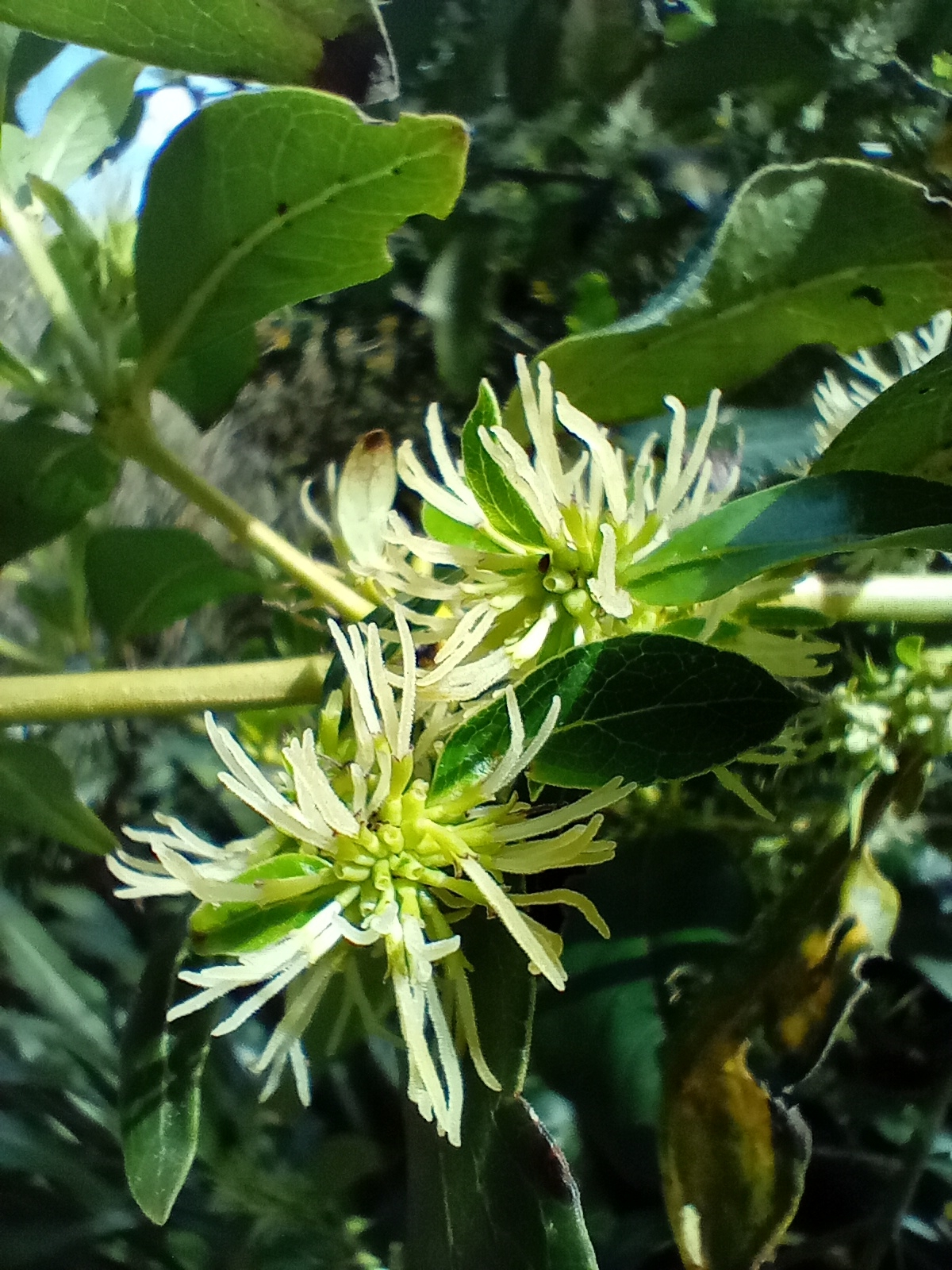
Female flowers

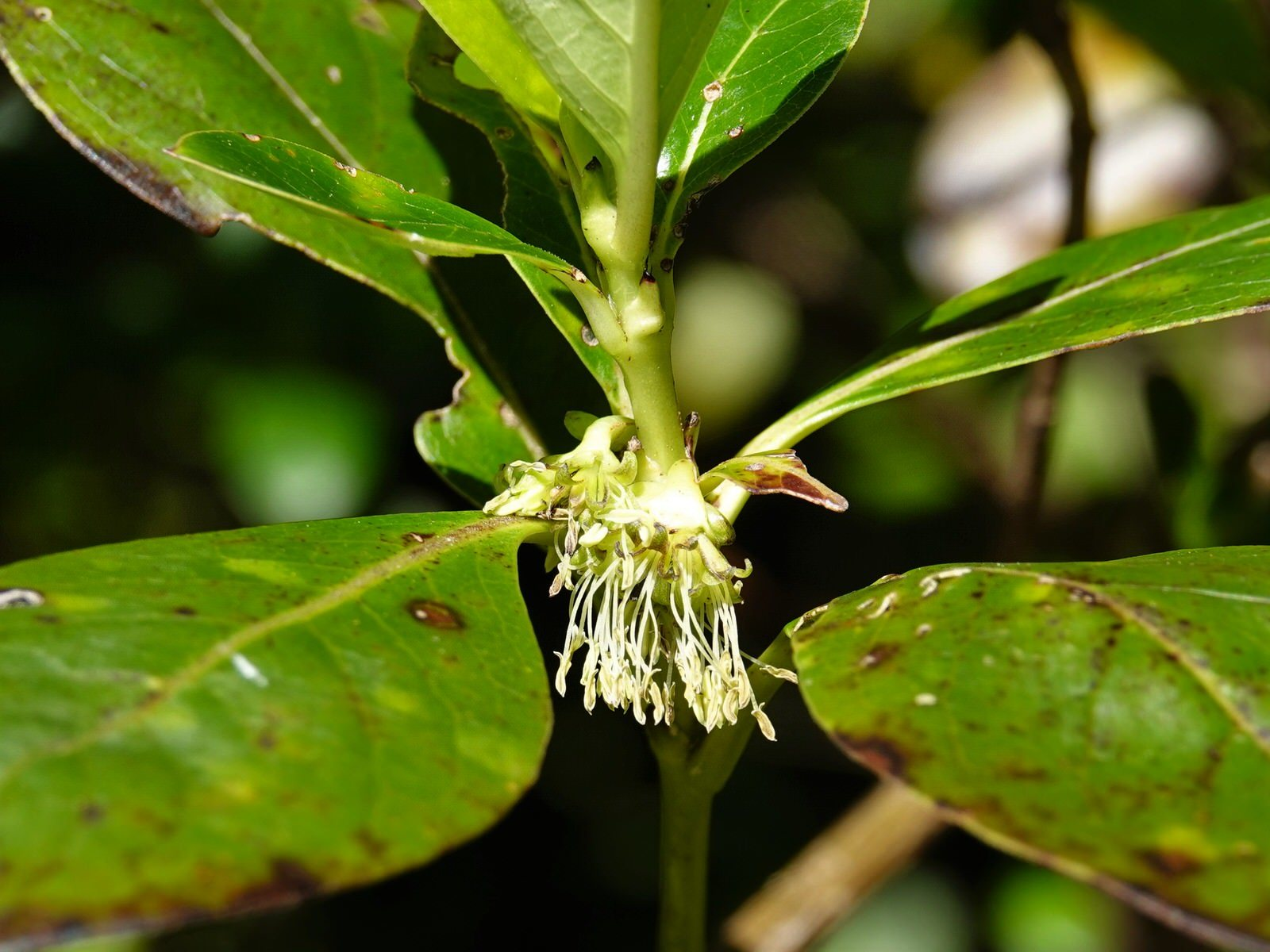
Male flowers

Whole plant showing form

Whole plant growing amongst others
