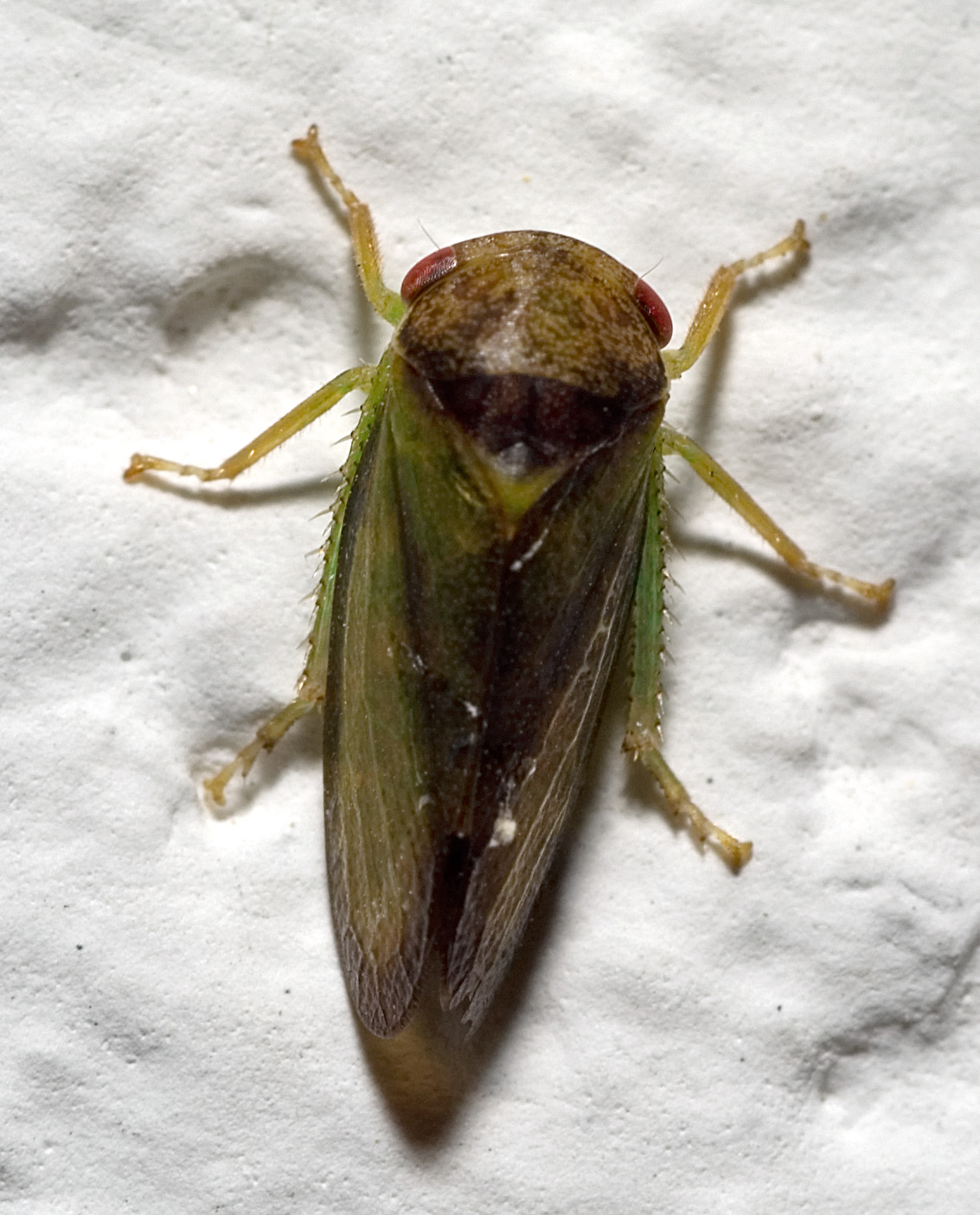

Scientific classification
- Domain: Eukaryota
- Kingdom: Animalia
- Phylum: Arthropoda
- Class: Insecta
- Order: Hemiptera
- Suborder: Auchenorrhyncha
- Family: Cicadellidae
- Subfamily: Iassinae
- Tribe: Iassini
- Genus: Iassus
- Species: I. lanio

Binomial name
- Iassus lanio Linnaeus, 1761

Synonyms
- Cicada lanio Linnaeus, 1760; Macropsis lanio (Linnaeus, 1760)

= Iassus lanio =

Species of true bug

Iassus lanio is the type species of planthoppers in its genus and the tribe Iassini. This species can be found throughout Europe including the British Isles through to Russia and Northern Africa; no subspecies are listed in the Catalogue of Life.
