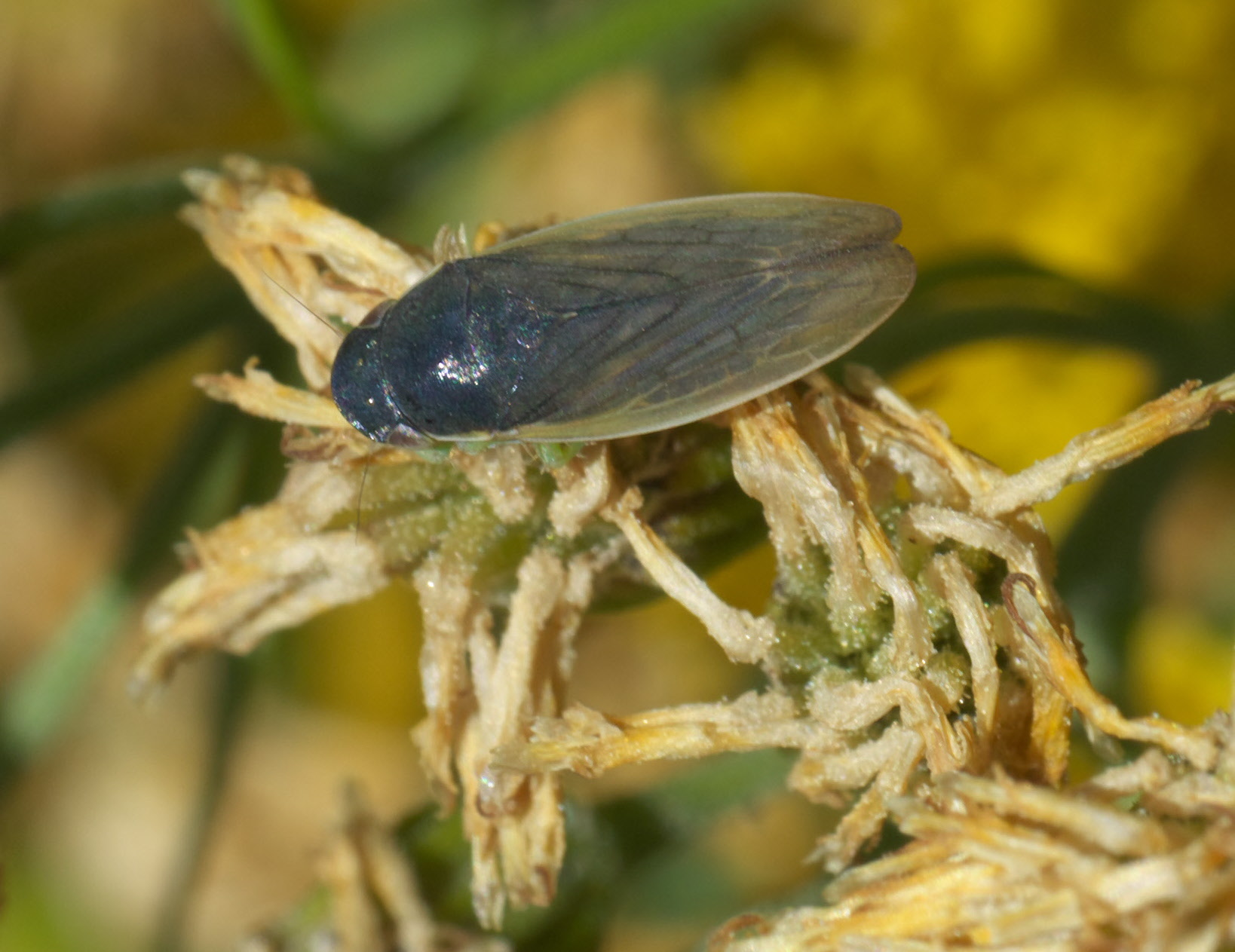
- Gypona contana

Scientific classification
- Kingdom: Animalia
- Phylum: Arthropoda
- Clade: Pancrustacea
- Class: Insecta
- Order: Hemiptera
- Suborder: Auchenorrhyncha
- Family: Cicadellidae
- Subfamily: Iassinae
- Tribe: Gyponini

= Gyponini =

Tribe of leafhoppers

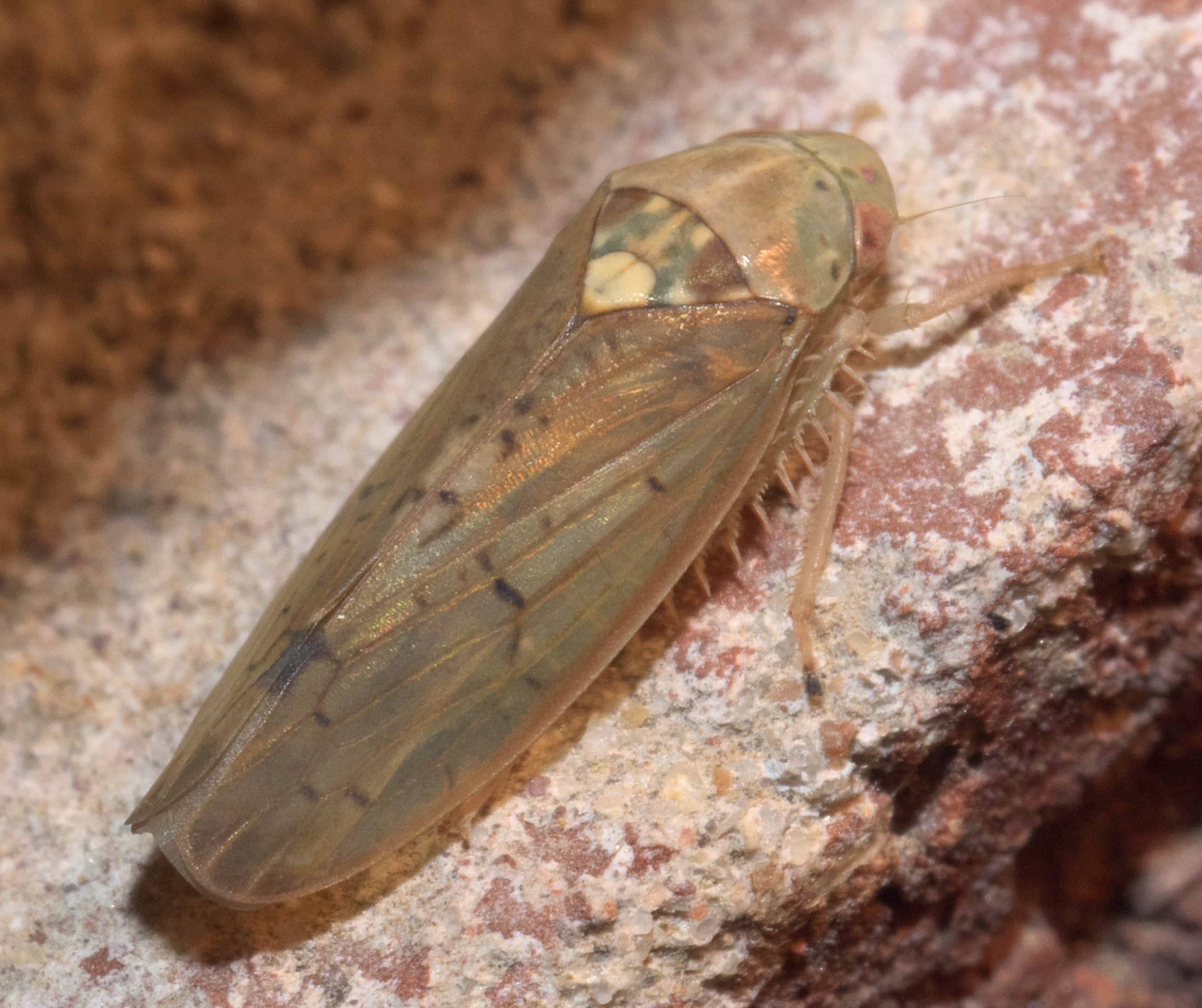
Ponana quadralaba

Gyponini is a tribe of leafhoppers in the family Cicadellidae, formerly treated as a subfamily, but now considered to belong within the subfamily Iassinae. Gyponini includes about 60 genera and more than 1,300 described species, located in the Americas.

== Genera ==
- Acuera DeLong & Freytag, 1972
- Acuponana DeLong & Freytag, 1970
- Acusana DeLong, 1942
- Acuthana Domahovski & Cavichioli, 2018
- Alapona DeLong, 1980
- Angucephala DeLong & Freytag, 1975
- Arapona DeLong, 1979
- Bahapona DeLong, 1977
- Barbatana Freytag, 1989
- Brevisana Freytag, 1987
- Caetana Domahovski, Gonçalves, Takiya & Cavichioli, 2019
- Carapona DeLong & Freytag, 1975
- Carnoseta DeLong, 1981
- Chilella DeLong & Freytag, 1967
- Chilenana DeLong & Freytag, 1967
- Chloronana DeLong & Freytag, 1964
- Clinonana Osborn, 1938
- Clinonella DeLong & Freytag, 1971
- Coelogypona DeLong & Freytag, 1966
- Costanana DeLong & Freytag, 1972
- Culumana DeLong & Freytag, 1972
- Curtara DeLong & Freytag, 1972
- Declivara DeLong & Freytag, 1971
- Doradana Metcalf, 1952
- Dragonana Ball & Reeves, 1927
- Dumorpha DeLong & Freytag, 1975
- Flexana DeLong & Freytag, 1971
- Folicana DeLong & Freytag, 1972
- Freytagana DeLong, 1975
- Fuminana Freytag, 1989
- Gracilipona Domahovski, Gonçalves & Takiya, 2024
- Gypona Germar, 1821
- Gyponana Ball, 1920
- Gyponites Statz, 1950
- Hamana DeLong, 1942
- Hecalapona DeLong & Freytag, 1975
- Hirsutapona Freytag, 2013
- Hyperapona Freytag, 2013
- Insolitana Domahovski, Gonçalves, Takiya & Cavichioli, 2019
- Kalopona Freytag, 2015
- Largulara DeLong & Freytag, 1972
- Marganana DeLong, 1948
- Minimana Freytag, 1987
- Nancyana Freytag, 1990
- Negosiana Oman, 1949
- Nulapona DeLong, 1976
- Nullana Statz, 1950
- Oligogypona Statz, 1950
- Oligopenthimia Freytag, 2015
- Planipona DeLong, 1982
- Platypona DeLong, 1942
- Polana Ball, 1920
- Ponana DeLong & Freytag, 1969
- Ponanella Ball, 1920
- Prairiana DeLong & Freytag, 1975
- Proxima DeLong & Freytag, 1975
- Rectapona Domahovski & Cavichioli, 2018
- Regalana DeLong & Freytag, 1964
- Reticana Osborn, 1938
- Rhogosana DeLong, 1942
- Rugosana DeLong, 1942
- Sagaripona Gonçalves, Takiya & Mejdalani, 2017
- Sakakibarana Le Peletier & Serville, 1825
- Scaris DeLong, 1976
- Sordana DeLong & Freytag, 1966
- Spinanella DeLong, 1977
- Sulcana DeLong & Freytag, 1971
- Tenuacia Freytag, 2015
- Tuberana Freytag, 1989
- Versutapona DeLong, 1981
- Villosana DeLong & Freytag, 1963
- Woldana DeLong & Freytag, 1975
- Zonana DeLong & Freytag, 1972
