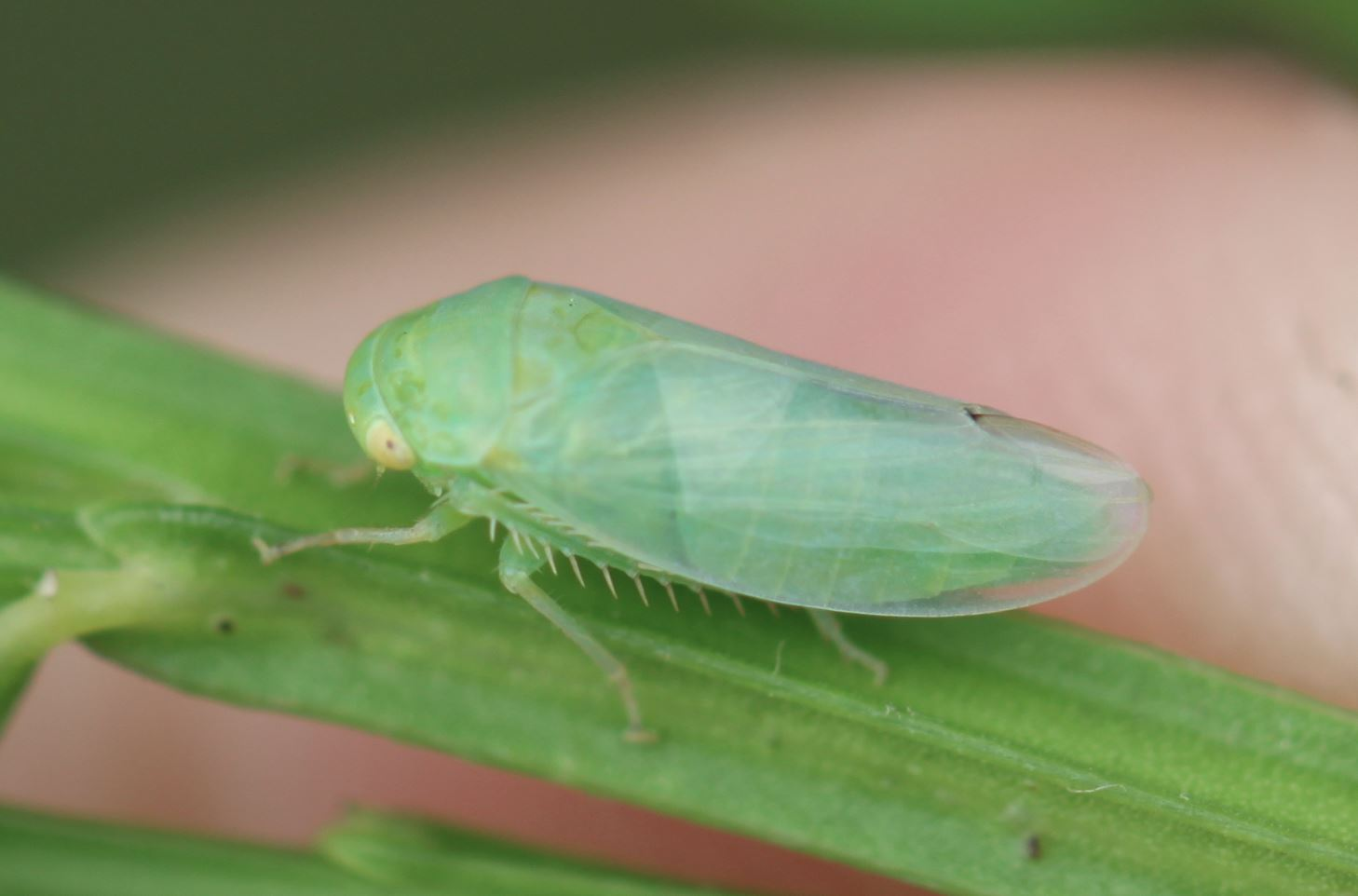
- Batracomorphus allionii

Scientific classification
- Kingdom: Animalia
- Phylum: Arthropoda
- Class: Insecta
- Order: Hemiptera
- Suborder: Auchenorrhyncha
- Family: Cicadellidae
- Subfamily: Iassinae
- Tribe: Batracomorphini
- Genus: Batracomorphus; Lewis, 1834

Synonyms
- List: Acojassus Evans, 1972; Batrachomorphus Agassiz, 1846; Batrachomorphus Lewis, 1834; Batrachomorphus Linnavuori, 1960; Batracomorpha Beamer & Lawson, 1945; Edijassus Evans, 1972; Eurinoscopus Kirkaldy, 1906; Eurinscopus Evans, 1936; Ossana Distant, 1914

= Batracomorphus =

Genus of leafhoppers

Batracomorphus is a genus of leafhoppers belonging to the family Cicadellidae.

The genus has an almost cosmopolitan distribution.

== Species ==
The following species are recognised in the genus Batracomorphus:

- Batrachomorphus femoralis Statz, 1950
- Batracomorphus abundans Linnavuori & Quartau, 1975
- Batracomorphus acestes Knight, 1983
- Batracomorphus acrisius Knight, 1983
- Batracomorphus acuminatus Linnavuori & Quartau, 1975
- Batracomorphus adrastus Knight, 1983
- Batracomorphus adspersus Heller & Linnavuori, 1968
- Batracomorphus adventitiosus Evans, 1966
- Batracomorphus aeneas Knight, 1983
- Batracomorphus agenor Knight, 1983
- Batracomorphus aigeios Linnavuori & Quartau, 1975
- Batracomorphus ajax Knight, 1983
- Batracomorphus akhmenes Linnavuori & Quartau, 1975
- Batracomorphus alceus Knight, 1983
- Batracomorphus alcides Knight, 1983
- Batracomorphus allionii (Turton, 1802)
- Batracomorphus ammon Knight, 1983
- Batracomorphus anchises Knight, 1983
- Batracomorphus ancus Knight, 1983
- Batracomorphus angolensis Linnavuori & Quartau, 1975
- Batracomorphus angularis Linnavuori & Quartau, 1975
- Batracomorphus angustatus (Osborn, 1934)
- Batracomorphus antenor Knight, 1983
- Batracomorphus anubis Knight, 1983
- Batracomorphus apicimacula Linnavuori & Quartau, 1975
- Batracomorphus arcuatus Linnavuori & Quartau, 1975
- Batracomorphus ares Knight, 1983
- Batracomorphus ariadne Linnavuori & Quartau, 1975
- Batracomorphus ariaramnes Linnavuori & Quartau, 1975
- Batracomorphus arsames Linnavuori & Quartau, 1975
- Batracomorphus artemis Knight, 1983
- Batracomorphus artemisiae Lindberg, 1958
- Batracomorphus ascanius Knight, 1983
- Batracomorphus astyages Linnavuori & Quartau, 1975
- Batracomorphus atossa Linnavuori & Quartau, 1975
- Batracomorphus atreus Knight, 1983
- Batracomorphus atrifrons (Metcalf, 1946)
- Batracomorphus avulsus Dlabola, 1964
- Batracomorphus bacchusi Knight, 1983
- Batracomorphus beninensis Quartau, 1981
- Batracomorphus bifasciatus Linnavuori & Quartau, 1975
- Batracomorphus bilobatus Linnavuori & Quartau, 1975
- Batracomorphus bispinosus Heller & Linnavuori, 1968
- Batracomorphus boschmai Blöte, 1964
- Batracomorphus boukokoensis Linnavuori & Quartau, 1975
- Batracomorphus boulardi Linnavuori & Quartau, 1975
- Batracomorphus breviceps Lindberg, 1923
- Batracomorphus brevis Kusnezov, 1929
- Batracomorphus briareus Knight, 1983
- Batracomorphus briseis Knight, 1983
- Batracomorphus brooksi Evans, 1972
- Batracomorphus brunneicollis Linnavuori & Quartau, 1975
- Batracomorphus brunneus (Matsumura, 1912)
- Batracomorphus brunomaculatus (Evans, 1947)
- Batracomorphus buxtoni (Osborn, 1934)
- Batracomorphus caeneus Knight, 1983
- Batracomorphus calchas Linnavuori & Quartau, 1975
- Batracomorphus callimachus Linnavuori & Quartau, 1975
- Batracomorphus calliope Knight, 1983
- Batracomorphus camillus Knight, 1983
- Batracomorphus capaneus Knight, 1983
- Batracomorphus cassandra Linnavuori & Quartau, 1975
- Batracomorphus castor Linnavuori & Quartau, 1975
- Batracomorphus catiline Knight, 1983
- Batracomorphus cato Linnavuori & Quartau, 1975
- Batracomorphus cecrops Linnavuori & Quartau, 1975
- Batracomorphus centralensis Linnavuori & Quartau, 1975
- Batracomorphus ceres Knight, 1983
- Batracomorphus ceresensis Quartau, 1981
- Batracomorphus chahbaharus Dlabola, 1979
- Batracomorphus charis Knight, 1983
- Batracomorphus charybdis Knight, 1983
- Batracomorphus cheesmanae Knight, 1983
- Batracomorphus chianguensis Linnavuori & Quartau, 1975
- Batracomorphus chlorophanoides Linnavuori & Quartau, 1975
- Batracomorphus chlorophanus (Melichar, 1903)
- Batracomorphus chryseis Knight, 1983
- Batracomorphus circe Knight, 1983
- Batracomorphus clarensis Quartau, 1981
- Batracomorphus classeyi Quartau, 1981
- Batracomorphus clavatus Cai & Shen, 2010
- Batracomorphus cloelia Knight, 1983
- Batracomorphus cocles Knight, 1983
- Batracomorphus coeus Knight, 1983
- Batracomorphus collinus (Osborn, 1934)
- Batracomorphus consignatus Dlabola, 1964
- Batracomorphus conspersus Linnavuori & Quartau, 1975
- Batracomorphus contaminatus Linnavuori & Quartau, 1975
- Batracomorphus coriaceus (Walker, 1869)
- Batracomorphus cornutus Li & Li, 2011
- Batracomorphus cossus Knight, 1983
- Batracomorphus creusa Linnavuori & Quartau, 1975
- Batracomorphus cronos Knight, 1983
- Batracomorphus curvatus Linnavuori, 1960
- Batracomorphus cybele Knight, 1983
- Batracomorphus cycnus Knight, 1983
- Batracomorphus cynthia Linnavuori & Quartau, 1975
- Batracomorphus cyprian Knight, 1983
- Batracomorphus daedalus Knight, 1983
- Batracomorphus daidalos Linnavuori & Quartau, 1975
- Batracomorphus dalatandoensis Quartau, 1981
- Batracomorphus danae Linnavuori & Quartau, 1975
- Batracomorphus dardanus Knight, 1983
- Batracomorphus daunus Knight, 1983
- Batracomorphus deiphobus Knight, 1983
- Batracomorphus dentestyleus Li & Wang, 2003
- Batracomorphus dentifer Linnavuori & Quartau, 1975
- Batracomorphus desertorum Kusnezov, 1929
- Batracomorphus dido Knight, 1983
- Batracomorphus diminutus (Matsumura, 1912)
- Batracomorphus diomede Knight, 1983
- Batracomorphus dirke Linnavuori & Quartau, 1975
- Batracomorphus dirkoides Linnavuori & Quartau, 1975
- Batracomorphus distinctissimus Quartau, 1981
- Batracomorphus dodona Linnavuori, 1969
- Batracomorphus dolon Knight, 1983
- Batracomorphus dryas (Kirkaldy, 1906)
- Batracomorphus duquensis Quartau, 1981
- Batracomorphus dymas Knight, 1983
- Batracomorphus echo Linnavuori, 1969
- Batracomorphus elegans (Evans, 1935)
- Batracomorphus elissa Knight, 1983
- Batracomorphus enyo Knight, 1983
- Batracomorphus erato Knight, 1983
- Batracomorphus eriphyle Knight, 1983
- Batracomorphus eryx Knight, 1983
- Batracomorphus eumenides Knight, 1983
- Batracomorphus evander Knight, 1983
- Batracomorphus expansus (Li & Wang, 1993)
- Batracomorphus extentus Cai & He, 2001
- Batracomorphus femoralis Statz, 1950
- Batracomorphus fernandesi Quartau, 1968
- Batracomorphus filigranus Linnavuori & Quartau, 1975
- Batracomorphus fletcheri Hu & Dai, 2021
- Batracomorphus foroforo Linnavuori & Quartau, 1975
- Batracomorphus furcatus Li & Wang, 2003
- Batracomorphus fuscomaculatus (Kuoh, 1983)
- Batracomorphus ganymede Knight, 1983
- Batracomorphus geminatus (Li & Wang, 1993)
- Batracomorphus geryon Knight, 1983
- Batracomorphus gobiswaterensis Quartau, 1981
- Batracomorphus gorensis Heller & Linnavuori, 1968
- Batracomorphus gracilidensus Li & Li, 2011
- Batracomorphus gracilis Li & Wang, 2003
- Batracomorphus gressitti Knight, 1983
- Batracomorphus guierae Linnavuori & Quartau, 1975
- Batracomorphus guzhangensis Li & Wang, 2003
- Batracomorphus hamadryas (Kirkaldy, 1907)
- Batracomorphus harpaganus Linnavuori & Quartau, 1975
- Batracomorphus harpago Linnavuori, 1960
- Batracomorphus harpalyce Knight, 1983
- Batracomorphus hebrus Knight, 1983
- Batracomorphus hecate Knight, 1983
- Batracomorphus hector Knight, 1983
- Batracomorphus hecuba Knight, 1983
- Batracomorphus helenus Knight, 1983
- Batracomorphus hera Knight, 1983
- Batracomorphus hermes Knight, 1983
- Batracomorphus hesione Knight, 1983
- Batracomorphus hesperides Knight, 1983
- Batracomorphus hipponax Linnavuori, 1969
- Batracomorphus hollisi Quartau, 1981
- Batracomorphus humilis Linnavuori & Quartau, 1975
- Batracomorphus hystaspes Linnavuori & Quartau, 1975
- Batracomorphus icarus Knight, 1983
- Batracomorphus ikmalios Linnavuori & Quartau, 1975
- Batracomorphus ilia Knight, 1983
- Batracomorphus ilioneus Knight, 1983
- Batracomorphus ilus Knight, 1983
- Batracomorphus imitans Jacobi, 1944
- Batracomorphus inachus Knight, 1983
- Batracomorphus inara Linnavuori & Quartau, 1975
- Batracomorphus incognitus Linnavuori & Quartau, 1975
- Batracomorphus indicus (Lethierry, 1892)
- Batracomorphus io Knight, 1983
- Batracomorphus iocasta Linnavuori, 1969
- Batracomorphus iris Knight, 1983
- Batracomorphus irroratus Lewis, 1834
- Batracomorphus itys Knight, 1983
- Batracomorphus iulus Knight, 1983
- Batracomorphus ixion Knight, 1983
- Batracomorphus janus Knight, 1983
- Batracomorphus jimmaensis Heller & Linnavuori, 1968
- Batracomorphus jove Knight, 1983
- Batracomorphus juno Knight, 1983
- Batracomorphus juturna Knight, 1983
- Batracomorphus kabwekanonus Linnavuori & Quartau, 1975
- Batracomorphus kapouensis Linnavuori & Quartau, 1975
- Batracomorphus kisala Linnavuori & Quartau, 1975
- Batracomorphus kivuensis Linnavuori & Quartau, 1975
- Batracomorphus krameri Linnavuori & Quartau, 1975
- Batracomorphus laertes Knight, 1983
- Batracomorphus laminocus Cai & He, 2001
- Batracomorphus lamto Linnavuori & Quartau, 1975
- Batracomorphus laodamia Knight, 1983
- Batracomorphus laomedon Knight, 1983
- Batracomorphus lateprocessus Li & Wang, 2003
- Batracomorphus laticeps (Osborn, 1934)
- Batracomorphus latinus Knight, 1983
- Batracomorphus latona Knight, 1983
- Batracomorphus lavinia Knight, 1983
- Batracomorphus leda Knight, 1983
- Batracomorphus lentiginosus (Kirkaldy, 1906)
- Batracomorphus leontion Linnavuori & Quartau, 1975
- Batracomorphus leto Knight, 1983
- Batracomorphus lewisi Quartau, 1981
- Batracomorphus liberiensis Linnavuori & Quartau, 1975
- Batracomorphus lineatus Cai & Shen, 2010
- Batracomorphus linnavuorii Kameswara Rao & Ramakrishnan, 1980
- Batracomorphus lituratus Linnavuori & Quartau, 1975
- Batracomorphus longispinus Linnavuori & Quartau, 1975
- Batracomorphus lucalensis Quartau, 1981
- Batracomorphus lunatus Cai & He, 2001
- Batracomorphus lusingaensis Linnavuori & Quartau, 1975
- Batracomorphus maculatus (Osborn, 1934)
- Batracomorphus maculipennis (Stål, 1870)
- Batracomorphus magniceps Linnavuori & Quartau, 1975
- Batracomorphus magnus (Distant, 1916)
- Batracomorphus maia Knight, 1983
- Batracomorphus mandane Linnavuori & Quartau, 1975
- Batracomorphus manlius Knight, 1983
- Batracomorphus matsumurai (Metcalf, 1966)
- Batracomorphus melampus Knight, 1983
- Batracomorphus memnon Knight, 1983
- Batracomorphus menelaus Knight, 1983
- Batracomorphus menoni Kameswara Rao & Ramakrishnan, 1980
- Batracomorphus mettus Knight, 1983
- Batracomorphus mimus Linnavuori & Quartau, 1975
- Batracomorphus minerva Linnavuori & Quartau, 1975
- Batracomorphus minos Linnavuori & Quartau, 1975
- Batracomorphus minusculus Linnavuori & Heller, 1961
- Batracomorphus misenus Knight, 1983
- Batracomorphus moira Linnavuori & Quartau, 1975
- Batracomorphus molestia (Kirkaldy, 1906)
- Batracomorphus molus Knight, 1983
- Batracomorphus mongbwalu Linnavuori & Quartau, 1975
- Batracomorphus montaguei (Distant, 1920)
- Batracomorphus montanus (Evans, 1972)
- Batracomorphus mosselensis Quartau, 1981
- Batracomorphus musaeus Knight, 1983
- Batracomorphus nabirensis Evans, 1972
- Batracomorphus narkissos Linnavuori & Quartau, 1975
- Batracomorphus natalensis Quartau, 1981
- Batracomorphus nereus Knight, 1983
- Batracomorphus nervoviridis Evans, 1972
- Batracomorphus nimule Linnavuori & Quartau, 1975
- Batracomorphus nitens Blöte, 1964
- Batracomorphus notatus (Kuoh, 1983)
- Batracomorphus notulatus Blöte, 1964
- Batracomorphus numa Knight, 1983
- Batracomorphus numitor Knight, 1983
- Batracomorphus ogasawarensis (Matsumura, 1912)
- Batracomorphus (Batracomorphus) olivacescens (Stål, 1855)
- Batracomorphus opticus Webb, 1980
- Batracomorphus orcus Knight, 1983
- Batracomorphus orestes Knight, 1983
- Batracomorphus orion Knight, 1983
- Batracomorphus orithyia Knight, 1983
- Batracomorphus othrys Knight, 1983
- Batracomorphus otus Knight, 1983
- Batracomorphus pakistanicus Naveed, Sohail, Islam & Zhang, 2020
- Batracomorphus palamedes Knight, 1983
- Batracomorphus palicus Knight, 1983
- Batracomorphus palinurus Knight, 1983
- Batracomorphus pallidus (Evans, 1935)
- Batracomorphus pamba Linnavuori & Quartau, 1975
- Batracomorphus pandarus Knight, 1983
- Batracomorphus paradentatus (Li & Wang, 1993)
- Batracomorphus pasiphae Linnavuori & Quartau, 1975
- Batracomorphus pelamys (Kirkaldy, 1906)
- Batracomorphus pelias (Kirkaldy, 1906)
- Batracomorphus pelops Knight, 1983
- Batracomorphus pentheus Knight, 1983
- Batracomorphus perplexus Linnavuori & Quartau, 1975
- Batracomorphus peteos Knight, 1983
- Batracomorphus phaidra Linnavuori & Quartau, 1975
- Batracomorphus pianmaensis Li & Wang, 2003
- Batracomorphus piceatus (Distant, 1908)
- Batracomorphus pictus Blöte, 1964
- Batracomorphus pilumnus Knight, 1983
- Batracomorphus pollux Linnavuori & Quartau, 1975
- Batracomorphus polydoros Linnavuori & Quartau, 1975
- Batracomorphus portunus Knight, 1983
- Batracomorphus priam Knight, 1983
- Batracomorphus procne Knight, 1983
- Batracomorphus procris Knight, 1983
- Batracomorphus proserpine Knight, 1983
- Batracomorphus protesilaus Knight, 1983
- Batracomorphus proteus Knight, 1983
- Batracomorphus pulvereus (Distant, 1908)
- Batracomorphus (Batracomorphus) punctatissimus (Melichar, 1908)
- Batracomorphus punctatus (Kirby, 1900)
- Batracomorphus punctilliger Anufriev, 1981
- Batracomorphus puncturatus Anufriev, 1971
- Batracomorphus pustulatus Blöte, 1964
- Batracomorphus pyrrhus Knight, 1983
- Batracomorphus quirimboensis Quartau, 1981
- Batracomorphus reflexus (Kuoh, 1983)
- Batracomorphus remus Knight, 1983
- Batracomorphus reuteri
- Batracomorphus rhea Knight, 1983
- Batracomorphus rhesus Knight, 1983
- Batracomorphus richteri Heller & Linnavuori, 1968
- Batracomorphus rinkihonis (Matsumura, 1912)
- Batracomorphus romulus Knight, 1983
- Batracomorphus roridus (Linnavuori, 1956)
- Batracomorphus rubrofrontalis (Distant, 1908)
- Batracomorphus (Batracomorphus) rutshurensis (Evans, 1955)
- Batracomorphus sabinus Knight, 1983
- Batracomorphus samaruensis Quartau, 1981
- Batracomorphus samii Evans, 1972
- Batracomorphus santosjuniori Linnavuori & Quartau, 1975
- Batracomorphus sapobensis Quartau, 1981
- Batracomorphus sarpedon Knight, 1983
- Batracomorphus scitus Linnavuori & Quartau, 1975
- Batracomorphus semele Knight, 1983
- Batracomorphus serranus Knight, 1983
- Batracomorphus sibyl Knight, 1983
- Batracomorphus signatus Lindberg, 1923
- Batracomorphus silvanus Knight, 1983
- Batracomorphus sinuatus Linnavuori & Quartau, 1975
- Batracomorphus sontiates (Kirkaldy, 1906)
- Batracomorphus sordidus Heller & Linnavuori, 1968
- Batracomorphus spadix Cai & Shen, 2010
- Batracomorphus stigmaticus (Matsumura, 1912)
- Batracomorphus strictus Li & Li, 2011
- Batracomorphus subfuscus (Li & Wang, 1993)
- Batracomorphus sudanicus Linnavuori & Quartau, 1975
- Batracomorphus tarchon Knight, 1983
- Batracomorphus tarpeia Knight, 1983
- Batracomorphus tarquin Knight, 1983
- Batracomorphus tatius Knight, 1983
- Batracomorphus teispes Linnavuori & Quartau, 1975
- Batracomorphus telamon Knight, 1983
- Batracomorphus telepinus Linnavuori & Quartau, 1975
- Batracomorphus tenuis Evans, 1972
- Batracomorphus tereus Knight, 1983
- Batracomorphus teucer Knight, 1983
- Batracomorphus thalia Knight, 1983
- Batracomorphus thamyris Linnavuori & Quartau, 1975
- Batracomorphus theagenes Linnavuori & Quartau, 1975
- Batracomorphus theognis Linnavuori & Quartau, 1975
- Batracomorphus theokritos Linnavuori & Quartau, 1975
- Batracomorphus thersites Linnavuori & Quartau, 1975
- Batracomorphus theseus Knight, 1983
- Batracomorphus thestor Knight, 1983
- Batracomorphus thetis Knight, 1983
- Batracomorphus thoas Knight, 1983
- Batracomorphus timaea Linnavuori, 1969
- Batracomorphus tithonus Knight, 1983
- Batracomorphus tityos Knight, 1983
- Batracomorphus torensis Evans, 1972
- Batracomorphus torquatus Knight, 1983
- Batracomorphus torrevillasi Knight, 1983
- Batracomorphus translucidus (Evans, 1942)
- Batracomorphus triangularis Linnavuori & Quartau, 1975
- Batracomorphus trifurcatus Li & Li, 2011
- Batracomorphus triton Knight, 1983
- Batracomorphus troilus Knight, 1983
- Batracomorphus tullus Knight, 1983
- Batracomorphus turnus Knight, 1983
- Batracomorphus tutuilanus (Osborn, 1934)
- Batracomorphus tydeus Knight, 1983
- Batracomorphus tyndareus Knight, 1983
- Batracomorphus ufens Knight, 1983
- Batracomorphus ussuriensis Anufriev, 1971
- Batracomorphus (Batracomorphus) v-nigrum Lindberg, 1923
- Batracomorphus vesta Knight, 1983
- Batracomorphus viator Linnavuori, 1969
- Batracomorphus villiersi Linnavuori, 1971
- Batracomorphus virbius Knight, 1983
- Batracomorphus viridinervis Blöte, 1964
- Batracomorphus viridipes (Distant, 1908)
- Batracomorphus viridis (Evans, 1935)
- Batracomorphus viridoflavidus (Metcalf, 1946)
- Batracomorphus walkeri (Metcalf, 1966)
- Batracomorphus wardi Quartau, 1981
- Batracomorphus welwitschi Quartau, 1981
- Batracomorphus xanthus Knight, 1983
- Batracomorphus xinxianensis Cai & Shen, 1999
- Batracomorphus zeus Knight, 1983
- BOLD:AAZ2054 (Batracomorphus sp.)
- BOLD:ADK4820 (Batracomorphus sp.)
- BOLD:ADK4825 (Batracomorphus sp.)
- BOLD:ADK7819 (Batracomorphus sp.)
- BOLD:ADU5602 (Batracomorphus sp.)
- BOLD:AEF3998 (Batracomorphus sp.)
- BOLD:AEG9877 (Batracomorphus sp.)
