= Gessius (leafhopper) =

Scientific classification
- Kingdom: Animalia
- Phylum: Arthropoda
- Clade: Pancrustacea
- Class: Insecta
- Order: Hemiptera
- Suborder: Auchenorrhyncha
- Family: Cicadellidae
- Subfamily: Iassinae
- Tribe: Krisnini
- Genus: Gessius; Distant, 1908

Diversity
- 10 species; see text

Genus of leafhoppers

Gessius is a genus of leafhoppers in the family Cicadellidae. There are 10 described species in Gessius.

== Species ==
- Gessius curvatus Wang & Li, 1997
- Gessius furcatus Wang & Li, 1997
- Gessius helvus Schmidt, 1920
- Gessius malayensis Baker, 1919
- Gessius nigridorsus Li & Wang, 2002
- Gessius pallidus Baker, 1919
- Gessius rufidorsus Wang & Li, 1997
- Gessius similis Schmidt, 1920
- Gessius strictus Wang & Li, 1997
- Gessius verticalis Distant, 1908
