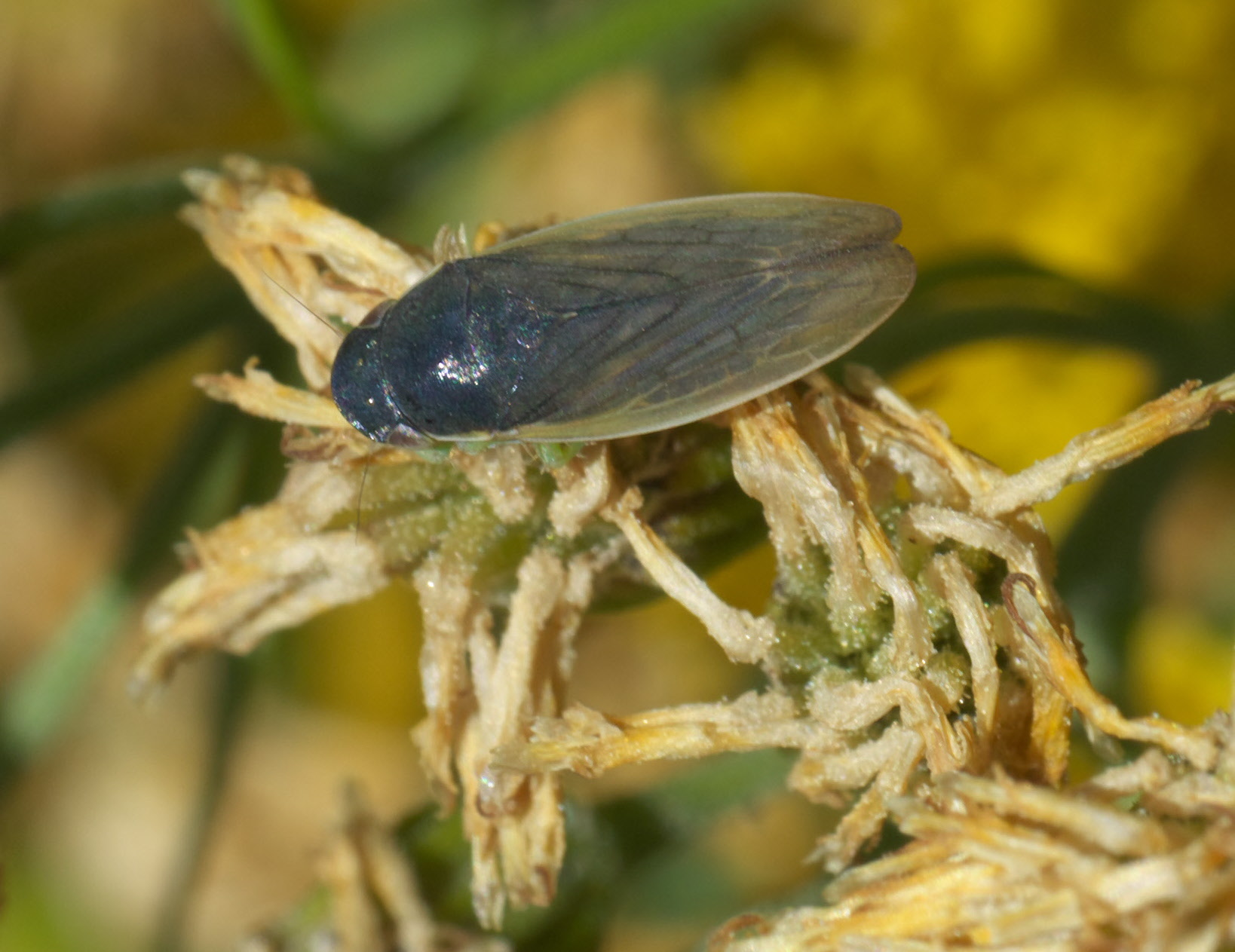
- Gypona melanota

Scientific classification
- Kingdom: Animalia
- Phylum: Arthropoda
- Clade: Pancrustacea
- Class: Insecta
- Order: Hemiptera
- Suborder: Auchenorrhyncha
- Family: Cicadellidae
- Tribe: Gyponini
- Genus: Gypona; Germar, 1821

= Gypona =

Genus of leafhoppers

Gypona is a genus of leafhoppers in the family Cicadellidae. Gypona is the largest genus in the tribe Gyponini.

The species of this genus are found in South America.

Species:

- Gypona abdominalis Spångberg, 1878
- Gypona abscida DeLong & Freytag, 1964
- Gypona amapa DeLong & Linnavuori, 1977
- Gypona anfracta DeLong & Linnavuori, 1977
- Gypona compacta DeLong & Linnavuori, 1977
- Gypona quadrella DeLong & Linnavuori, 1977
