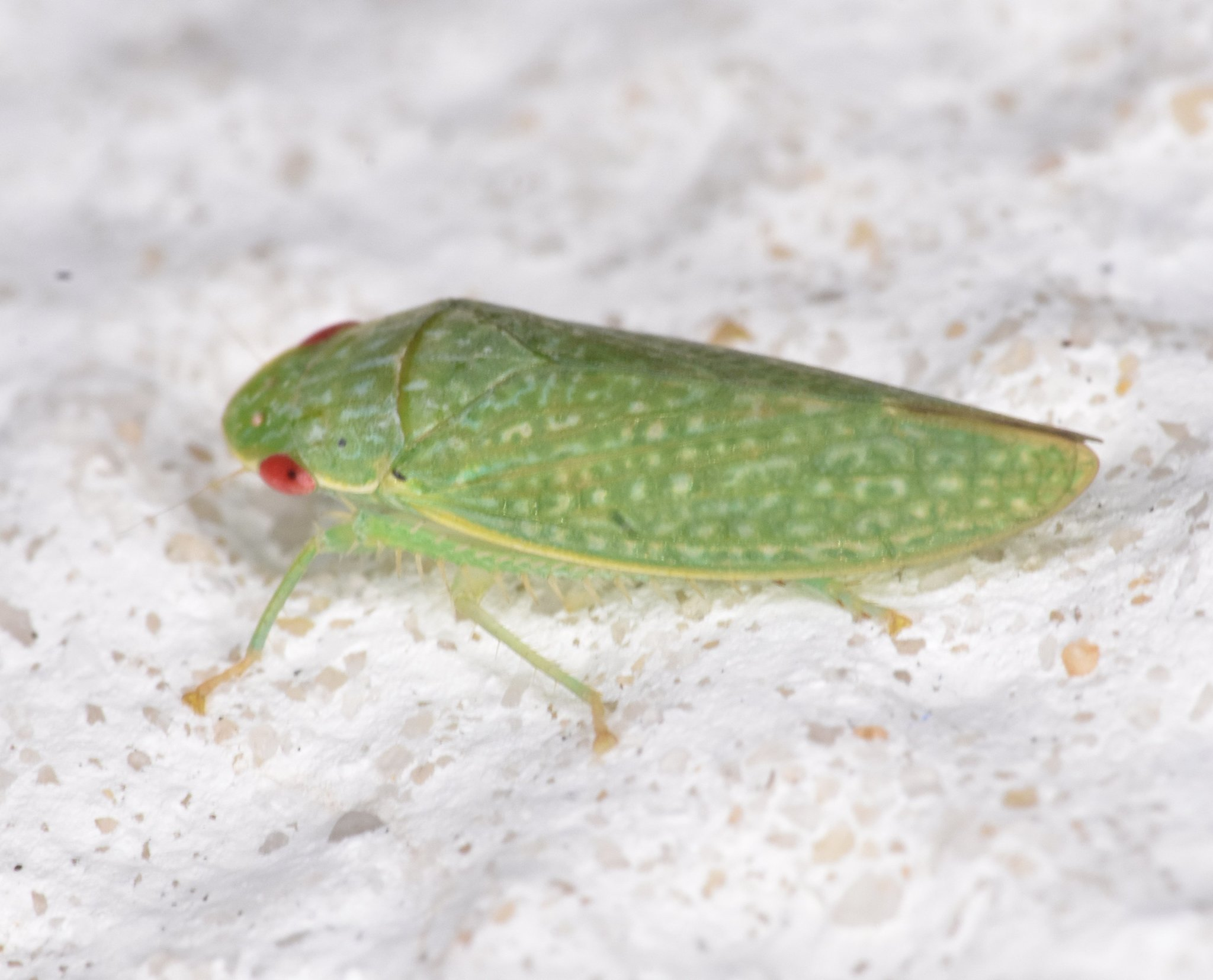
- Rugosana querci

Scientific classification
- Domain: Eukaryota
- Kingdom: Animalia
- Phylum: Arthropoda
- Class: Insecta
- Order: Hemiptera
- Suborder: Auchenorrhyncha
- Family: Cicadellidae
- Tribe: Gyponini
- Genus: Rugosana; DeLong, 1942

Synonyms
- Rugosa DeLong, 1942

= Rugosana =

Genus of leafhoppers

Rugosana is a genus of leafhoppers belonging to the family Cicadellidae. The species of this genus are found in North America.

== Species ==
The following species are recognised in the genus Rugosana:

- Rugosana ampliata (Ball, 1935)
- Rugosana carpa Freytag, 2005
- Rugosana chadana (Ball & Reeves, 1927)
- Rugosana compta (Fowler, 1903)
- Rugosana consora DeLong & Freytag, 1964
- Rugosana edita DeLong & Freytag, 1964
- Rugosana fibrata DeLong, 1942
- Rugosana lora DeLong, 1942
- Rugosana manua DeLong, 1942
- Rugosana pacta DeLong & Freytag, 1964
- Rugosana plummeri DeLong, 1942
- Rugosana pullata (Ball, 1935)
- Rugosana puniceiventris (Fowler, 1903)
- Rugosana querci DeLong, 1942
- Rugosana ramosa (Kirkaldy, 1907)
- Rugosana reta Freytag, 2005
- Rugosana rugosa (Spångberg, 1878)
- Rugosana urbana DeLong & Freytag, 1964
- Rugosana varga DeLong & Freytag, 1973
- Rugosana venusta DeLong & Freytag, 1964
- Rugosana verrucosa DeLong, 1942
