= List of entomology journals =

The following is a list of entomological journals and magazines:

Title	Years	Country	ISSN	Publisher
Acta Entomologica Musei Nationalis Pragae	1923–present	Czech Republic	0374-1036 (print); 1804-6487 (web)	National Museum (Prague)
Acta Entomologica Serbica	1926–present	Serbia	0354-9410 (print); 2406-1581 (web)	Entomological Society of Serbia
Acta Entomologica Silesiana	1993–present	Poland	1230-7777 (print); 2353-1703 (web)	Śląskie Towarzystwo Entomologiczne
Acta Entomologica Sinica	1950–present	China	0454-6296	Entomological Society of China
Acta Entomologica Slovenica	1993–present	Slovenia	1318-1998	Slovenian Entomological Society Štefan Michieli and Natural History Museum of Slovenia
Acta Zoologica Fennica	1926–present	Finland	0001-7299	Finnish Zoological and Botanical Publishing Board
African Entomology	1993–present	South Africa	1021-3589 (print); 2224-8854 (web)	Entomological Society of Southern Africa
African Invertebrates (formerly Annals of the Natal Museum)	2001–present	South Africa	1681-5556 (print); 2305-2562 (web)	Pensoft Publishers on behalf of the KwaZulu-Natal Museum
African Journal of Tropical Entomology Research	2021–present	DR Congo	2791-0113	Entomological Society of Congo and Institut facultaire des sciences agronomiques de Yangambi Laboratoire d’entomologie appliquée et fonctionnelle
Agricultural and Forest Entomology	1999–present	United Kingdom	1461-9555 (print); 1461-9563 (web)	Wiley-Blackwell on behalf of the Royal Entomological Society of London
Alpine Entomology (until 2016 Journal of the Swiss Entomological Society	1862–present	Switzerland	2535-0889	Pensoft Publishers
American Bee Journal	1861–present	United States	0002-7626	Dadant and Sons
Amurian Zoological Journal	2009–present	Russia	1999-4079 (print); 2686-9519 (web)	Herzen State Pedagogical University of Russia
Anais da Sociedade Entomológica do Brasil: see Neotropical Entomology	1972–2000	Brazil	0301-8059	Sociedade Entomológica do Brasil
Annales de la Société entomologique de France	1832–present	France	0037-9271 (print); 2168-6351 (web)	Société entomologique de France
Annales Zoologici	1922–present	Poland	0003-4541 (print); 1734-1833 (web)	Natura Optima Dux Foundation, Polish Academy of Sciences
Annals of the Entomological Society of America	1908–present	United States	0013-8746 (print); 1938-2901 (web)	Entomological Society of America
Annals of the Natal Museum: see African Invertebrates	1906–2000	South Africa	0304-0798	
Annual Review of Entomology	1956–present	United States	0066-4170 (print); 1545-4487 (web)	Annual Reviews
Apidologie (formed by the merger of Annales l'Abeille and Zeitschrift für Bienenforschung)	1970–present	France / Germany	0044-8435	INRA / Deutscher Imkerbund
Applied Entomology and Zoology	1966–present	Japan	0003-6862	Japanese Society of Applied Entomology and Zoology
Aquatic Insects: International Journal of Freshwater Entomology	1979–present		0165-0424 (print); 1744-4152 (web)	Taylor & Francis
Archives of Insect Biochemistry and Physiology	1983–present		0739-4462 (print); 1520-6327 (web)	Wiley-Blackwell
Arthropod Management Tests	1999–present	United States	2155-9848 (print); 2155-9856 (web)	Entomological Society of America
Arthropod Structure & Development (formerly International Journal of Insect Morphology and Embryology)	2000–present		1467-8039	Elsevier
Asian Myrmecology	2007–present		2462-2362	Universiti Malaysia Sabah
Atropos	1996–present	United Kingdom	1478-8128	Atropos
Australian Entomologist	1974–present	Australia	1320-6133	Entomological Society of Queensland
Austral Entomology (formerly Australian Journal of Entomology)	1962–present	Australia	2052-174X (print); 2052-1758 (web)	Wiley-Blackwell on behalf of the Australian Entomological Society
Berliner Entomologische Zeitschrift: see Deutsche Entomologische Zeitschrift	1857–1942	Germany	0323-6145	
Besoiro	1995–present	France	1267-2157	Patrick Arnaud
BioControl (formerly Entomophaga)	1956–present		1386-6141	International Organization for Biological Control
Biocontrol Science and Technology	1991–present		0958-3157 (print); 1360-0478 (web)	Taylor & Francis
Biosystematica	2007–present	India	0973-9955 (print); 0973-7871 (web)	Prof. T.C. Narendran Trust for Animal Taxonomy
British Journal of Entomology and Natural History	1988–present	United Kingdom	0952-7583	British Entomological and Natural History Society
Bulletin de la Société Sciences Nat	1972–1995	France	0249-5805	Sciences Nat
Bulletin du Muséum National d'Histoire Naturelle: see Zoosystema	1895–1997	France		Muséum national d'Histoire naturelle
Bulletin of the Amateur Entomologists' Society	1939–present	United Kingdom	0266-836X	Amateur Entomologists' Society
Bulletin of the Brooklyn Entomological Society	1878–1965	United States	1051-8932	Brooklyn Entomological Society
Bulletin of Entomological Research	1910–present		0007-4853	Cambridge Journals
Bulletin of Insectology	1928–present	Italy	1721-8861 (print); 2283-0332 (web)	Alma Mater Studiorum - Università di Bologna
Bulletin of the Irish Biogeographical Society	1976–present	Republic of Ireland	0332-1185	Irish Biogeographical Society
Canadian Entomologist	1868–present	Canada	0008-347X (print); 1918-3240 (web)	Entomological Society of Canada
Caucasian Entomological Bulletin	2005–present	Russia	1814-3326 (print); 2713-1785 (web)	Southern Scientific Center RAS
Cesa News	2008–present	Turkey		Centre for Entomological Studies Ankara (Cesa)
Coléoptères	1995–present	France	1265-3357	Roger-Paul Dechambre
Deutsche Entomologische Zeitschrift (formerly Berliner Entomologische Zeitschrift)	1954–present	Germany	1435-1951 (print); 1860-1324 (web)	Wiley-Blackwell on behalf of the Museum für Naturkunde
Dipterists Digest	1988–present	United Kingdom	0953-7260	Dipterists Forum
Ecological Entomology (formerly Transactions of the Royal Entomological Society of London)	1976–present	United Kingdom	0307-6946 (print); 1365-2311 (web)	Wiley on behalf of the Royal Entomological Society of London
Elateridarium	2007–present	Czech Republic	1802-4858	Elater
Elytron	1987–present	Spain	0214-1353	European Association of Coleopterology
Entomofauna	1980–present	Germany	0250-4413	
Entomologia Experimentalis et Applicata	1958–present	Netherlands	0013-8703	The Netherlands Entomological Society
Entomologia Generalis	1974–present	Germany	0171-8177	Schweizerbart Science Publishers, Stuttgart
Entomologia Hellenica	1983–present	Greece	0254-5381	Hellenic Entomological Society
Entomologica Americana	1885–1975	United States	0096-3712	Brooklyn Entomological Society
Entomologica Americana (formerly Journal of the New York Entomological Society)	2009–present	United States	1947-5136 (print); 1947-5144 (web)	New York Entomological Society
Entomological News	1890–present	United States	0013-872X	American Entomological Society
Entomological Research (formerly Korean Journal of Entomology)	1970–present	Korea, Republic of	1748-5967	Wiley-Blackwell on behalf of the Entomological Society of Korea
Entomological Science	1998–present	Japan	1479-8298	Entomological Society of Japan
Entomologische Berichte: see Entomologische Nachrichten und Berichte	1957–1981	Germany	0425-1075	
Entomologische Berichten	1918–present	Netherlands	0013-8827	Nederlandse Entomologische Vereniging
Entomologische Nachrichten und Berichte (formerly Entomologische Berichte)	1982–present	Germany	0232-5535	Karl-Marx-Universität Leipzig
Entomologische Rundschau (formerly Insektenbörse and Entomologisches Wochenblatt)	1909–1939	Germany	—N/a	
Entomologische Zeitschrift	1887–1944; 1949–present	Germany	0013-8843	Verlag Eugen Ulmer
Entomologisches Wochenblatt: see Entomologische Rundschau	1907–1908	Germany	—N/a	
Entomologisk Tidskrift	1880–present	Sweden	0013-886X	The Entomological Society of Sweden/Sveriges Entomologiska Förening
Entomologist's Gazette	1950–2023	United Kingdom	0013-8894	E. W. Classey (1950–1990); Gem Publishing (1991–2006); Pemberley Books (2007–present)
Entomologist's Monthly Magazine	1864–present	United Kingdom	0013-8908	Pemberley Books
Entomon	1976–present	India	0377-9335	Association for Advancement of Entomology
Entomotaxonomia	1979–present	China	2095-8609	
Environmental Entomology	1972–present	United States	0046-225X	Entomological Society of America
Ethnoentomology	2016–present	Czech Republic	2570-804X	Brian J. Dykstra
Eurasian Entomological Journal	2002–present	Russia	1684-4866	KMK Scientific Press Ltd
European Journal of Entomology (formerly Acta entomologica bohemoslovaca)	1904–present	Czech Republic	1210-5759 (print); 1802-8829 (web)	Czech Academy of Sciences and Czech Entomological Society
Experimental and Applied Acarology	1985–present		0168-8162 (print); 1572-9702 (web)	Springer
Far Eastern Entomologist	1994–present	Russia	1026-051X (print); 2713-2196 (web)	Far East Branch of the Russian Entomological Society and Laboratory of Entomology, Institute of Biology and Pedology
Fauna Norvegica Series B: see Norwegian Journal of Entomology	1978–1999	Norway	0332-7698	Norwegian Entomological Society
Florida Entomologist	1917–present	United States	0015-4040	Florida Entomological Society
Folia Heyrovykana	1993–present	Czech Republic	1801-7150	Kabourek Publishing
Formosan Entomologist	1981–present	Taiwan	2414-1194	Taiwan Entomological Society
Fragmenta Entomologica	1951–present	Italy	0429-288X (print); 2284-4880 (web)	PagePress Publishing/Belvedere Publishing
Graellsia	1943–present	Spain	0367-5041	
Halteres	2009–present	India	0973-1555 (print); 2348-7372 (web)	
Indago (formerly Navorsinge van die Nasionale Museum)	1952–present	South Africa	0067-9208	National Museum, Bloemfontein
Insecta Mundi	1985–present	United States	0749-6737 (print); 1942-1354 (web)	Center for Systematic Entomology
Insect Biochemistry: see Insect Biochemistry and Molecular Biology	1971–1991	United Kingdom	0965-1748	Elsevier
Insect Biochemistry and Molecular Biology (formerly Insect Biochemistry)	1992–present	United Kingdom	0965-1748	Elsevier
Insectes Sociaux	1954–present	Switzerland	0020-1812	Birkhäuser Verlag
Insect Molecular Biology	1992–present	United Kingdom	0962-1075 (print); 1365-2583 (web)	Wiley on behalf of the Royal Entomological Society of London
Insect Systematics and Evolution (formerly Entomologica Scandinavica)	2000–present	Denmark	1399-560X	Brill
Insektenbörse: see Entomologische Rundschau	1884–1906	Germany	0020-1839	
International Journal of Acarology	1975–present		0164-7954 (print); 1572-9702 (web)	Taylor & Francis
International Journal of Entomology (formerly Pacific Insects)	1983–1985	United States	0735-6250	Bishop Museum
International Journal of Insect Morphology and Embryology: see Arthropod Structure & Development	1971–1999		0020-7322	
International Journal of Mosquito Research	2014–present	India	2348-5906	
International Journal of Tropical Insect Science	1980–present	United Kingdom	1742-7584	Cambridge Journals
Invertebrate Systematics	1987–present	Australia	1445-5226	CSIRO Publishing
Irish Naturalists' Journal	1925–present	Republic of Ireland	0021-1311	Irish Naturalists' Journal Ltd
Israel Journal of Entomology	1966–present	Israel	0075-1243 (print); 2224-6304 (web)	The Entomological Society of Israel
Japanese Journal of Applied Entomology and Zoology	1957–present	Japan	0021-4914	Japanese Society of Applied Entomology and Zoology
Japanese Journal of Entomology (new series begun in 1999)	1926–present	Japan	0915-5805	Entomological Society of Japan
Journal of Agricultural Entomology: see Journal of Agricultural and Urban Entomology	1984–1998	United States	0735-939X (print); 2153-6465 (web)	South Carolina Entomological Society
Journal of Agricultural and Urban Entomology (formerly Journal of Agricultural Entomology)	1998–present	United States	1523-5475 (print); 2153-652X (web)	South Carolina Entomological Society
Journal of Apiculture	1986–present	Korea, Republic of	1225-0252	Apicultural Society of Korea
Journal of Applied Entomology (formerly Zeitschrift für Angewandte Entomologie)	1986–present		0931-2048 (print); 1439-0418 (web)	Wiley-Blackwell for the Deutsche Gesellschaft für Angewandte Entomologie
Journal of Arachnology	1973–present	United States	0161-8202	American Arachnological Society
Journal of Asia-Pacific Entomology	1998–present	Korea, Republic of	1226-8615 (print); 1876-7990 (web)	Elsevier for the Korean Society of Applied Entomology
Journal of Economic Entomology	1908–present	United States	0022-0493	Entomological Society of America
Journal of Entomology	1862–1866	United Kingdom	1812-5670	Academic Journals
Journal of Entomology and Zoology Studies	2013–present		2349-6800 (print); 2320-7078 (web)	AkiNik Publications
Journal of Entomology, Series B: Taxonomy: see Systematic Entomology	1971–1976	United Kingdom		Royal Entomological Society of London
Journal of Hymenoptera Research	1992–present		1070-9428 (print); 1314-2607 (web)	International Society of Hymenopterists
Journal of Insect Behavior	1998–present		0892-7553 (print); 1572-8889 (web)	Springer
Journal of Insect Conservation	1997–present		1366-638X (print); 1572-9753 (web)	Springer
Journal of Insect Pathology: see Journal of Invertebrate Pathology	1959–1964	United States	0095-9049	
Journal of Insect Physiology	1957–present		0022-1910	Elsevier
Journal of Insect Science	2001–present	United States	1536-2442	Entomological Society of America
Journal of Insect Science	1987–present	India	0970-3837 (print); 2250-2645 (web)	Indian Society for the Advancement of Insect Science
Journal of Integrated Pest Management	2010–present	United States	2155-7470	Entomological Society of America
Journal of Invertebrate Pathology (formerly Journal of Insect Pathology)	1965–present	United States	0022-2011 (print); 1096-0805 (web)	Elsevier for the Society for Invertebrate Pathology
Journal of Medical Entomology	1964–present	United States	0022-2585 (print); 1938-2928 (web)	Entomological Society of America
Journal of Orthoptera Research	1992–present	Canada	1082-6467	Orthopterists' Society
Journal of Stored Products Research	1965–present		0022-474X (print); 1879-1212 (web)	Elsevier
Journal of the American Mosquito Control Association (formerly Mosquito News)	1985–present	United States	8756-971X	American Mosquito Control Association
Journal of the British Dragonfly Society	1983–present	United Kingdom	1357-2342	British Dragonfly Society
Journal of the Entomological Research Society	1999–present	Turkey	1302-0250	Gazi Entomological Research Society
Journal of the Entomological Society of Ontario (formerly Proceedings of the Entomological Society of Ontario)	1870–present	Canada	1713-7845	Entomological Society of Ontario
Journal of the Kansas Entomological Society	1932–present	United States	0022-8567 (print); 1937-2353 (web)	Kansas Entomological Society
Journal of the New York Entomological Society: see Entomologica Americana	1893–2006	United States	0028-7199 (print); 1937-2361 (web)	New York Entomological Society
Journal of the Swiss Entomological Society; see Alpine Entomology				
Journal of Tropical Entomology	2011–present		2012-8746	Habitats Conservation Initiative
Journal of Vector Ecology	1995–present	United States	1081-1710 (print); 1948-7134 (web)	Wiley-Blackwell for the Society for Vector Ecology
Klapalekiana (formerly Zprávy Československé Společnosti Entomologické)	1965–present	Czech Republic	1210-6100	Czech Entomological Society
Lambillionea (Tervuren)	1945–present	Belgium	0774-2819	Union des Entomologistes belges
Latvijas Entomologs	1960–2016	Latvia	0320-3743	Entomological Society of Latvia
Medical and Veterinary Entomology	1987–present	United Kingdom	0269-283X (print); 1365-2915 (web)	Wiley-Blackwell on behalf of the Royal Entomological Society of London
Miscellanea Entomologica	1892–1988	France	0750-7933	Barthe; Le Moult; Sciences Nat
Miscellaneous Papers	1989–present	Turkey	1015-8235	Centre for Entomological Studies Ankara (Cesa)
Mosquito News: see Journal of the American Mosquito Control Association	1941–1984	United States	0027-142X	American Mosquito Control Association
Munis Entomology & Zoology	2006–present	Turkey	1306-3022	
Myrmecological News	1995–present	Austria	1994-4136 (print); 1997-3500 (web)	Austrian Society of Entomofaunistics
Neotropical Entomology (formerly Anais da Sociedade Entomológica do Brasil)	2001–present	Brazil	1519-566X	Sociedade Entomológica do Brasil
New Zealand Entomologist	1967–present	New Zealand	0077-9962	Entomological Society of New Zealand
Norwegian Journal of Entomology (formerly Fauna Norvegica Series B)	1921–1978; 1999–present	Norway	1501-8415	Norwegian Entomological Society
Nota Lepidopterologica	1977–present		2367-5365	Pensoft Publishers
Novitates Entomologicae	1931–1944	France	0996-004X	Le Moult
Novitates Zoologicae	1894–1948	United Kingdom	0950-7655	Walter Rothschild
Onychium	2004–2018	Italy	1824-2669	Gruppo Entomologico Toscano
Oriental Insects	1967–present		0030-5316 (print); 2157-8745 (web)	Taylor & Francis
Osmia	2007–present	Belgium	2727-3806	Observatoire des Abeille
Pacific Insects (renamed to International Journal of Entomology in 1983)	1959–1983	United States	0030-8714	Bishop Museum
Pacific Insects Monographs	1961–1986	United States	0078-7515	Bishop Museum
Pan-Pacific Entomologist	1924–present	United States	0031-0603	Pacific Coast Entomological Society
Papilio	1881–1884	United States	0196-5832	New York Entomological Club
Papilio (New Series)	1981–present	United States	2372-9449	
Pest Management Science	1970–present		1526-498X (print); 1526-4998 (web)	Wiley-Blackwell
Phegea	1973–present	Belgium	0771-5277	
Physiological Entomology (formerly Proceedings of the Royal Entomological Society of London parts A and C)	1976–present	United Kingdom	0307-6962 (print); 1365-3032 (web)	Wiley-Blackwell on behalf of the Royal Entomological Society of London
Polish Journal of Entomology	1922–present	Poland	0032-3780 (print); 2299-9884 (web)	Polish Entomological Society
Priamus	1981–present	Turkey	1015-8243	Centre for Entomological Studies Ankara (Cesa)
Proceedings of the Entomological Society of Washington	1884–present	United States	0013-8797	The Entomological Society of Washington
Proceedings of the Hawaiian Entomological Society	1906–present	United States	0073-134X	Hawaiian Entomological Society
Proceedings of the Royal Entomological Society of London, Series A: General Entomology: see Physiological Entomology	1926–1976	United Kingdom	0375-0418 (print); 2056-5321 (web)	Royal Entomological Society of London
Proceedings of the Royal Entomological Society of London, Series B: Taxonomy: see Systematic Entomology	1932–1970	United Kingdom	0375-0434 (print); 2056-5291 (web)	Royal Entomological Society of London
Proceedings of the Royal Entomological Society of London, Series C: Journal of Meetings: see Physiological Entomology	1936–1977	United Kingdom	1946-1496 (print); 1946-150X (web)	Royal Entomological Society of London
Psyche	1874–2000; 2007–present	United States	0033-2615 (print); 1687-7438 (web)	Cambridge Entomological Club (1874–2000), Hindawi Publishing Corporation (2007–present)
Revista Brasileira de Entomologia	1954–present	Brazil	0085-5626	SciELO
Revista Chilena de Entomología	1951–present	Chile	0034-740X (print); 0718-8994 (web)	Sociedad Chilena de Entomología
Rovartani Lapok	1884–1926	Hungary	—N/a	Magyar Entomologiai Társaság
Russian Entomological Journal	1992–present	Russia	0132-8069	KMK Scientific Press Ltd
Sociobiology	1975–present	Brazil	0361-6525	Feira de Santana State University
Southwestern Entomologist	1976–present	United States	0147-1724	Society of Southwestern Entomologists
Systematic Entomology (formerly Proceedings of the Royal Entomological Society of London, Series B: Taxonomy and Journal of Entomology, Series B: Taxonomy)	1976–present	United Kingdom	0307-6970 (print); 1365-3113 (web)	Wiley on behalf of the Royal Entomological Society of London
Studia dipterologica	1994–present	Germany	0945-3954	
Studies and Reports, Taxonomical Series (formerly Studies and Reports of District Museum Prague-East, Taxonomical Series)	2010–present	Czech Republic	1805-5648	Czech University of Life Sciences Prague
Taiwanese Journal of Entomological Studies	2016–present	Taiwan	2521-4012	Taiwanese Society of Insect Natural History
The Coleopterist	1992–present	United Kingdom	0965-5794	The Coleopterist
The Coleopterists Bulletin	1947–present	United States	0010-065X (print); 1938-4394 (web)	The Coleopterists Society
The Entomologist	1840–present	United Kingdom	0013-8878	
The Entomologist's Record and Journal of Variation	1890–present	United Kingdom	0013-8916	Amateur Entomologists' Society
The European Entomologist	2007–present	Czech Republic	1803-1366	Sphingidae Museum
Tijdschrift voor Entomologie	1857–2025	Netherlands	0040-7496	Naturalis
Tinea	1953–present	Japan	0493-3168	Japan Heterocerists' Society
Transactions of the American Entomological Society	1867–present	United States	0002-8320	American Entomological Society
Transactions of the Royal Entomological Society of London: see Ecological Entomology	1836–1976	United Kingdom	1365-2311	Royal Entomological Society of London
Ukrainska Entomofaunistyka	2010–present	Ukraine	2078-9653	Entomological Society of Kiev & I.I.Schmalhausen Institute of Zoology
Ukrainskyi Entomologichnyi Zhurnal	2010–present	Ukraine	2226-4272	Ukrainian Entomological Society
Zeitschrift für Angewandte Entomologie: see Journal of Applied Entomology	1914–1985		1439-0418	Wiley-Blackwell for the Deutsche Gesellschaft für Angewandte Entomologie
Zoologische Mededelingen	1915–present	Netherlands	0024-0672 (print); 1876-2174 (web)	National Museum of Natural History
Zoosystema	1997–present	France	1280-9551	Muséum national d'Histoire naturelle
Zoosystematica Rossica	1992–present	Russia	0320-9180 (print); 2410-0226 (web)	Zoological Institute, Russian Academy of Sciences
