= List of British entomological publishers =

Britain has a number of specialist entomological publishers:

- Amateur Entomologists' Society (http://www.amentsoc.org/) publishes various entomological handbooks, as well as the Bulletin of the Amateur Entomologists' Society.
- British Wildlife Publishing has published identification guides to Lepidoptera and Odonata.
- E. W. Classey was based in Faringdon, Oxfordshire. It produced reprints of Norman Joy's A Practical Handbook of British Beetles in 1976 and 1997. No longer trading.
- Field Studies Council (http://www.field-studies-council.org/publications/index.aspx) publishes the AIDGAP series of identification guides and since 2006 the Royal Entomological Society Handbooks as well as an extensive range of fold-out identification charts. Some of the earliest insect ID guides are available for free download from http://www.field-studies-council.org/fieldstudies/category/terrestrial.htm.
- Gem Publishing Company (https://web.archive.org/web/20070930125146/http://www.gempublishing.co.uk/) is based in Oxfordshire. It is best known as the publishing house for the entomological journals Entomologist's Gazette and Entomologist's Monthly Magazine. No longer trading.
- Harley Books is based in Colchester, Essex. It is best known as the publisher of the multi-volume series Moths and Butterflies of Great Britain and Ireland.
- Hillside Books, Canterbury . Publisher of The Beetles of the World series, volumes 25-30 and their supplements, The Parnassiinae of the World by Jean-Claude Weiss , The Genus Morpho by Patrick Blandin .
- Pemberley Books (Publishing) (http://www.pemberleybooks.com/). Since 2007 Pemberley Books has been publishing the journals Entomologist's Gazette and Entomologist's Monthly Magazine. They also have the back stock of the entomological publications of Gem Publishing and of E. W. Classey.
- Peregrine Productions (http://www.bombus.freeserve.co.uk/) publishes a range of laminated insect identification plates.
- Pisces Conservation (http://www.pisces-conservation.com/softebooks.html) publishes a wide range of entomological and other titles, in print and on CD-ROM, including 'Land and Water Bugs of the British Isles', 'British Tortricoid Moths', many other Ray Society monographs, and F.N. Pierce's 'Genitalia of the British Lepidoptera' series.
- Siri Scientific Press (http://www.siriscientificpress.co.uk) is a specialist publisher focusing on arachnology, entomology and palaeontology (especially of insects in amber). Current works in preparation include on the fossil insects of southwest England. They are currently seeking new authors on the above topics.
