= Entomological Society =

Entomological Society may refer to:

- Acadian Entomological Society
- Amateur Entomologists' Society
- Australian Entomological Society
- Czech Entomological Society
- Egyptian Entomological Society
- Entomological Society of America
- Entomological Society of Canada
- Entomological Society of China
- Entomoligical Society of Iran
- Entomological Society of Israel
- Entomological Society of Japan
- Entomological Society of Malta
- Entomological Society of New South Wales
- Entomological Society of New Zealand
- Entomological Society of Queensland
- Entomological Society of Sweden
- Entomological Society of Victoria
- Entomological Society of Washington
- Flemish Entomological Society
- Florida Entomological Society
- Lancashire and Cheshire Entomological Society
- Maine Entomological Society
- Netherlands Entomological Society
- New England Entomological Society
- New York Entomological Society
- North Carolina Entomological Society
- Norwegian Entomological Society
- Polish Entomological Society
- Royal Belgian Entomological Society
- Royal Entomological Society of London
- Société Entomologique de France
- Texas Entomological Society
- Ukrainian Entomological Society
