= Norman H. Joy =

British ornithologist and coleopterist

Norman Humbert Joy (7 July 1874 – 20 January 1953) was a British ornithologist and coleopterist.

He is best known for his two-volume work A Practical Handbook of British Beetles, first published by H. F. & G. Witherby in January 1932, a publication which remained the standard work on the identification of British beetles into the 21st century. He also wrote two other titles: How to Know British Birds, published by Witherby in 1936 and British Beetles, their Homes and Habits. Joy's beetle collection is held at the British Entomological and Natural History Society headquarters at Dinton Pastures Country Park, Berkshire. Some beetle specimens collected by Joy from the Berkshire area are held at the Museum of Reading.

An obituary was published on page 213 of volume 89 of the Entomologist's Monthly Magazine. The rove beetles Gyrophaena joyi and Gyrophaena joyioides were named after him.

== Discoveries ==
Joy described a number of beetles as new to science. In chronological order these were:

- the hydraenid beetle Hydraena britteni in 1907
- the rove beetle Astenus lyonessius in 1908
- the rove beetle Thinobius bicolor in 1911
- the ground beetle Bradycellus sharpi and the rove beetle Bledius fergussoni in 1912
- the rove beetles Gabrius suffragani, G. subnigritulus, G. toxotes, Philhygra malleus, P. obtusangula and P. britteni in 1913
- the rove beetle Atheta nannion in 1931

The latridiid beetle Enicmus histrio and the rove beetle Bisnius scoticus were described jointly with John Tomlin in 1910 and 1913 respectively.

In addition to his work on Coleoptera, Joy also discovered the Brown Ant Lasius brunneus (then unknown in Britain) at Theale in Berkshire on 21 January 1923 (Donisthorpe 1927). The Berkshire Birds website credits him as discovering the ornithological potential of Reading Sewage Farm.

== Sport ==
In 1896, Joy played at right half in a Southern League football match for West Hertfordshire, the team that later became Watford Football Club.
