= Journal of Insect Science =

Journal of Insect Science may refer to either one of the following two journals:

- Journal of Insect Science (Entomological Society of America)
- Journal of Insect Science (Indian Society for the Advancement of Insect Science)
