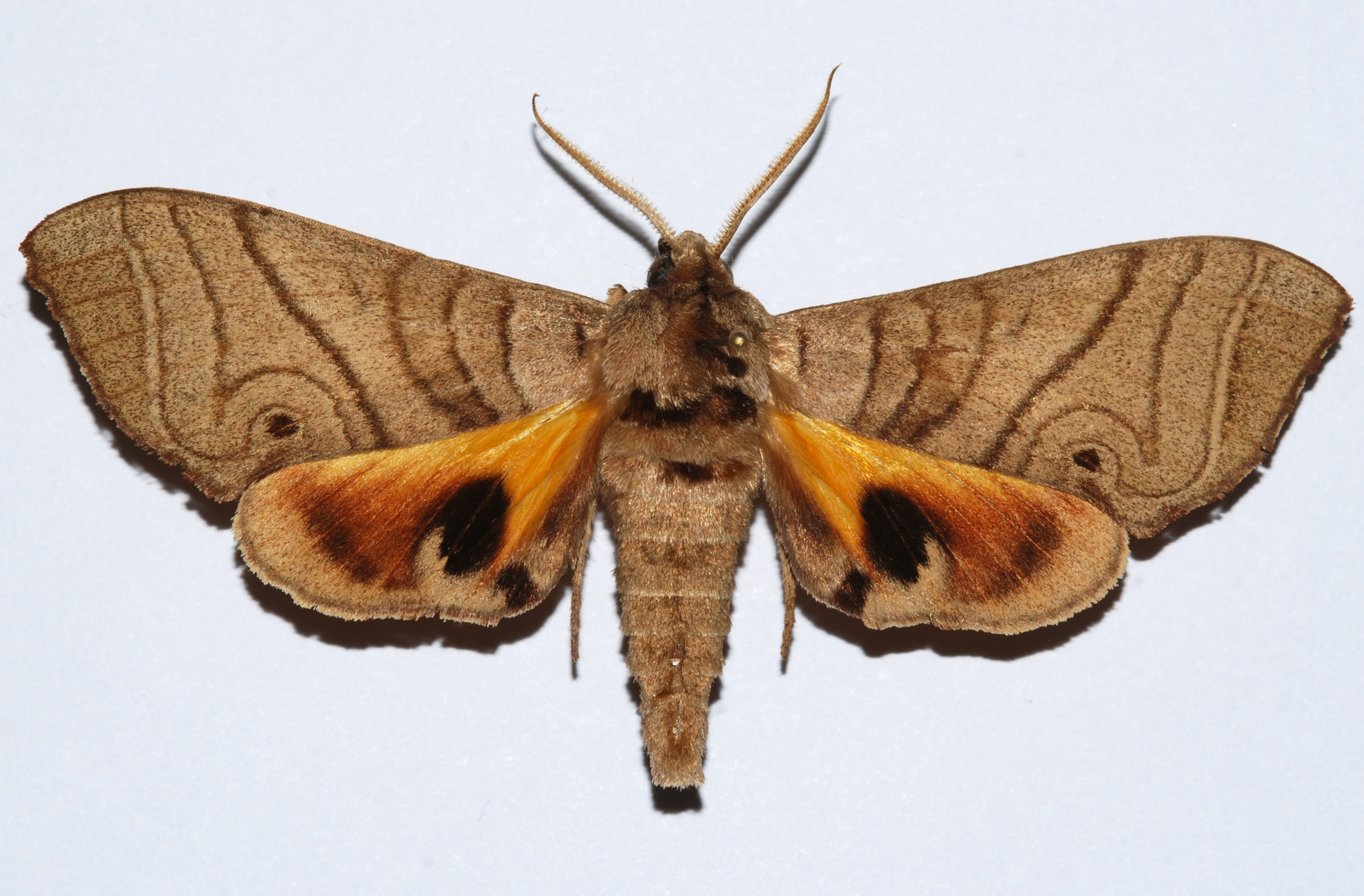
- Gynoeryx meander

Scientific classification
- Domain: Eukaryota
- Kingdom: Animalia
- Phylum: Arthropoda
- Class: Insecta
- Order: Lepidoptera
- Family: Sphingidae
- Tribe: Smerinthini
- Genus: Gynoeryx; Carcasson, 1968

= Gynoeryx =

Genus of moths

Gynoeryx is a genus of moths in the family Sphingidae first described by Robert Herbert Carcasson in 1968.

== Species ==
- Gynoeryx bilineatus (Griveaud 1959)
- Gynoeryx brevis (Oberthur 1909)
- Gynoeryx integer (Viette 1956)
- Gynoeryx meander (Boisduval 1875)
- Gynoeryx paulianii (Viette 1956)
- Gynoeryx teteforti (Griveaud 1964)
