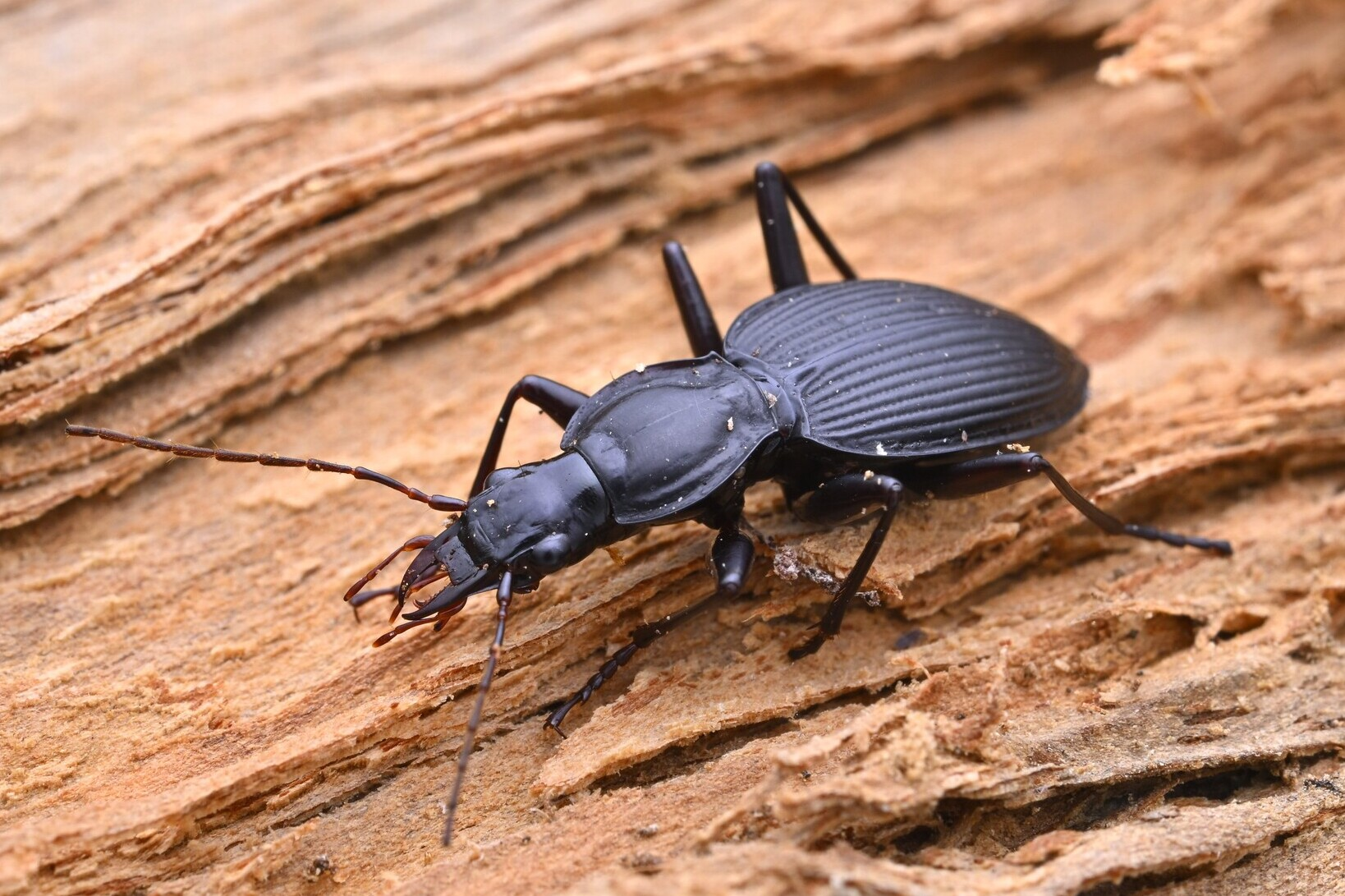

Scientific classification
- Kingdom: Animalia
- Phylum: Arthropoda
- Clade: Pancrustacea
- Class: Insecta
- Order: Coleoptera
- Suborder: Adephaga
- Family: Carabidae
- Genus: Ctenognathus
- Species: C. novaezelandiae

Binomial name
- Ctenognathus novaezelandiae (Fairmaire, 1843)

= Ctenognathus novaezelandiae =

Species of beetle endemic to New Zealand

Ctenognathus novaezelandiae is a species of ground beetle endemic to New Zealand.

== Taxonomy ==
=== Taxonomic history and nomenclature ===
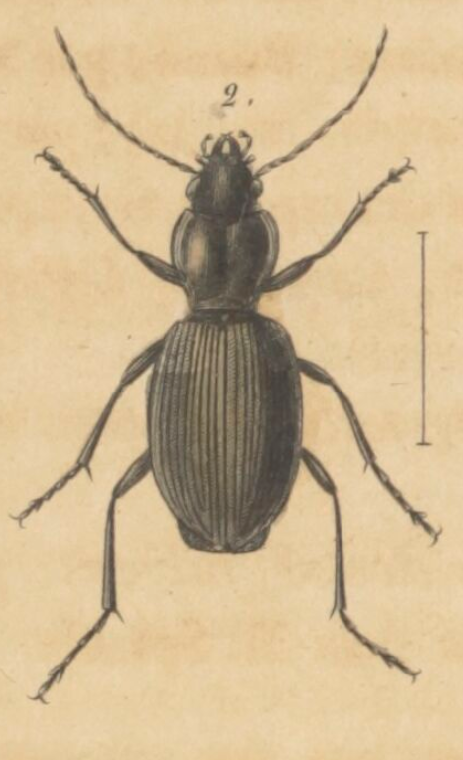
Fairmaire's colour plate of his new species.

Ctenognathus novaezelandiae was first described under the name Anchomenus novae-zelandiae by Léon Fairmaire in a paper presented to the Société Entomologique on the meeting of 18 January 1843 and subsequently published in their Annales. Despite titling his description of the species Anchomenus novae-zelandiae, Fairmaire noted that the species seemed to deserve to be separated from Anchomenus and classified into its own genus, which he declared he would name Ctenognathus (from Greek κτείς, "comb" and γνάθος, "jaw") after its "comb-shaped" mandibles. Fairmaire's description included an account of the beetle's physical characteristics; of its distribution, he wrote only that it came from New Zealand. He also included illustrations for the back of the journal: a colour plate of the whole beetle as well as line drawings of the structure of the legs and mouth. The plate was captioned "Anchomenus (Ctenognathus) Novæ Zelandiae". Fairmaire's holotype specimen could not be found in the MNHN's Fairmaire collection for a 2021 paper, but according to said paper, "there is no ambiguity regarding the identity of this taxon; the original description can only apply to the species as currently understood." The English report on entomological discoveries in New Zealand of the Ross Expedition used the name "Anchomenus (Ctenognathus) Novæ Zeelandiae [sic]" and placed it among other Anchomenus species. The genus Ctenognathus is accepted to have been established by Fairmaire in his 1843 Annales article by Manaaki Whenua's Fauna of New Zealand catalogue and their Biota of New Zealand database, by the 1939 Nomenclator Zoologicus, and Thomas Broun's 1880 Manual of the New Zealand Coleoptera. Ctenognathus novaezelandiae is also considered the type species of the genus Ctenognathus by monotypy. The authority for C. novaezelandiae is cited in brackets, which are usually employed to indicate placement in a different genus than was originally chosen. However, the International Code of Zoological Nomenclature (ICZN) states (article 51.3.3) that for names established before 1961 where the author placed the species in one genus but provisionally established a new genus to accommodate it, brackets should be used in the author citation when citing the species name in combination with the provisionally established generic name: thus Anchomenus novae-zelandiae Fairmaire, 1843 is listed as a synonym of Ctenognathus novaezelandiae (Fairmaire, 1843). The change in species name from novae-zelandiae to novaezelandiae follows the ICZN article 32.5.2, which views the hyphen as an incorrect original spelling that should be corrected by removal.

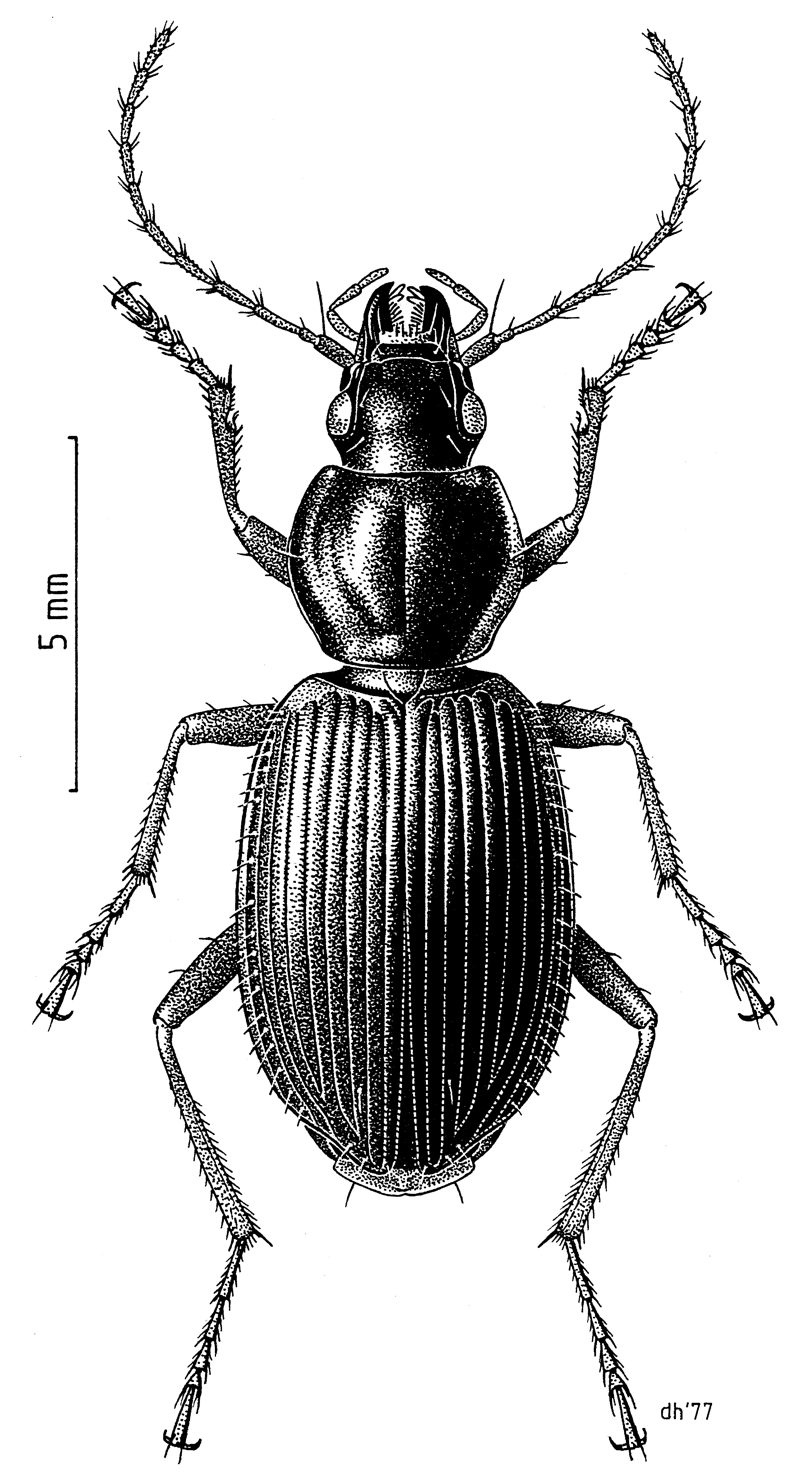
1977 drawing of C. novaezelandiae by Des Helmore

=== Synonyms ===
One Anchomenus species described from Port Nicholson, Anchomenus elevatus White, 1846, was previously considered a synonym as well, but a 2021 Insecta Mundi paper by André Larochelle and Marie-Claude Larivière reinstated it as a full species, Ctenognathus elevatus. The following species are currently considered synonyms of C. novaezelandiae per Manaaki Whenua and the 2021 paper:

- Ctenognathus montivagus (Broun, 1880)
  - = Anchomenus montivagus Broun, 1880
  - = Ctenognathus latipennis Sharp, 1886
- Ctenognathus perrugithorax (Broun, 1880)
  - = Anchomenus perrugithorax Broun, 1880
- Ctenognathus punctulatus (Broun, 1877)
  - = Anchomenus punctulatus Broun, 1877
- Ctenognathus suborbithorax (Broun, 1880)
  - = Anchomenus suborbithorax Broun, 1880
- Ctenognathus neozelandicus (Chaudoir, 1878)
  - = Colpodes neozelandicus Chaudoir, 1878
- Ctenognathus politulus (Broun, 1880)
  - = Anchomenus politulus Broun, 1880

=== Placement ===
Fairmaire did not classify his species beyond being a beetle; the Ross Expedition report placed the species in the family Carabidae, while Broun placed Ctenognathus in the Cicindelidae group. Kuschel (1990) placed it in the Carabidae, subfamily Agoninae. The 2001 Fauna of New Zealand catalogue places it in the Carabidae, subfamily Platyninae, tribe Platynini, subtribe Platynina, as does the 2010 New Zealand Inventory of Biodiversity. The tribe Platynini is found around the world and throughout New Zealand, where they are represented by eight genera.

== Distribution and habitat ==
Ctenognathus species are found on the North and South islands of New Zealand, though according to Fauna of New Zealand, many have only been recorded from the former: C. novaezelandiae is among these. Fauna of New Zealand reports it from much of the North Island, in the Northland, Auckland, Waikato, Coromandel, Bay of Plenty, Taranaki, Wanganui, and Wellington collecting regions. The 2021 paper by the same authors reported the beetles in Hawkes Bay as well, but not from Wellington. Records from the Global Biodiversity Information Facility (GBIF), which include citizen scientist identifications via iNaturalist, agree with this range, with observations from Wellington to Cape Reinga. The GBIF also includes two observations from Great Island in the Manawatāwhi / Three Kings Islands whereas neither Fauna of New Zealand nor the 2021 paper included records from New Zealand's offshore islands. The GBIF also includes several records from the Aldermen Islands, the Mercury Islands, Great Barrier Island, Little Barrier Island, the Hen and Chicken Islands, and the Poor Knights Islands, none of which were assessed in the catalogue or the paper. GBIF data includes a great many observations in the highly populated Auckland area.

Guillermo Kuschel, in a case study on the beetles of Lynfield, Auckland, reported the beetles to be common and found broadly on bushes, beaches, and the ground. He found them especially on plants by shores and "coastal slopes and cliffs".
