= Per Olof Christopher Aurivillius =

Swedish entomologist (1843–1928)

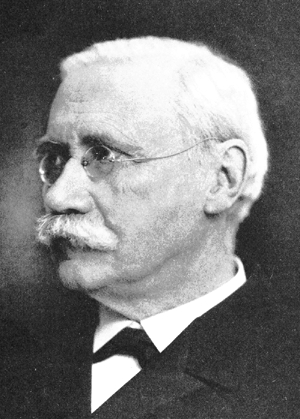
- Born: 15 January 1843; Forsa, Sweden-Norway
- Died: 20 July 1928 (aged 85)
- Scientific career
- Fields: Entomology

Per Olof Christopher Aurivillius (15 January 1843 – 20 July 1928) was a Swedish entomologist.

== Life ==
Christopher Aurivillius was born at Forsa, Sweden. He was the director of the Natural History Museum in Stockholm and he specialised in Coleoptera and Lepidoptera. He was, for a long time, the secretary of the Royal Swedish Academy of Science . His brother was the zoologist Carl Wilhelm Samuel Aurivillius (1854–1899) and his son the zoologist Sven Magnus Aurivillius (1892–1928).

He was the author of Part 39 Cerambycidae: Cerambycinae (1912) and Parts 73 and 74. Cerambycidae: Lamiinae (1922, 1923) in: S. Schenkling (ed.), Coleopterorum Catalogus. W. Junk, Berlin, 1000 + pages. Also Rhopalocera Aethiopica (1898), major contributions to Adalbert Seitz's Die Großschmetterlinge der Erde Band 13: Abt. 2, Die exotischen Großschmetterlinge, Die afrikanischen Tagfalter, 1925 and many papers on the Lepidoptera of Africa and Über sekundäre Geschlechtscharaktere nordischer Tagfalter Stockholm (1880). In 1922, he discovered the beetle Ozineus dimidiatus which is part of the family Cerambycidae.

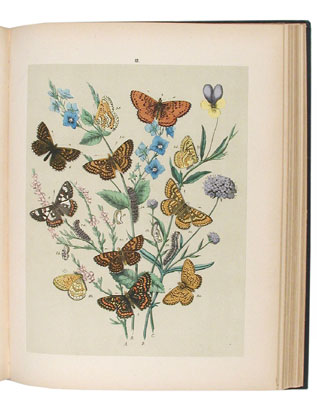
Plate from Nordischer Tagfalter

Aurivillius was also the permanent secretary of Royal Swedish Academy of Sciences from 1901 to 1923.

== Papers on African Lepidoptera ==
- Aurivillius, 1893 "Diagnosen neuer lepidopteren aus Afrika" Entomologisk Tidskrift 14: 199–214
- ———, 1894 "Beiträge zur Kenntniss der Insektenfaun von Kamerun. 2. Tagfalter" Entomologisk Tidskrift. 15: 273–314
- ———, 1898 "Diagnosen neuer Lepidopteren aus Afrika" Entomologisk Tidskriftr. 19: 177–186
- ———, 1898 "Neue Nymphaliden aus dem Congogebiete Öfvers" K. Vetensk Akad. Förh. Stockh. 54: 279–286
- ———, 1901 "Diagnosen neuer Lepidopteren aus Afrika" Entomologisk Tidskrift. 22: 113–128
