= List of schools and organizations related to forensic entomology =

Forensic entomology is the study of insects related to humans. There are three areas associated with forensic entomology: urban entomology, stored products entomology, and mediocriminal entomology. This list concerns only the area of mediocriminology and the schools and organizations associated with it. Mediocriminology is the interaction of the criminal justice system and the use of insects for investigations pertaining to the deaths of humans. This is a growing science in which nations around the world are partaking in research to expand its applications. The following list of schools and organizations is not comprehensive due to the ever-changing nature of forensic entomology.

== Schools ==
=== Texas A&M University ===
Texas A&M University's Entomology Department announced the Forensic and Investigative Science Program November 23, 2007 as a means to prepare students to address and solve problems through the use of various techniques, including forensic entomology. This program offers the first B.S. in this field in Texas. The staff consists of several professors and lecturers, most notably Dr. Jeff Tomberlin, assistant professor since fall 2007 and member of the American Board of Forensic Entomology Certified Entomologists and University of Georgia graduate with a Ph.D. in entomology. Another noteworthy entomologist at Texas A&M is Adrienne Brundage, a lecturer since spring 2008 with an M.S. in organismal biology, with experience in many aspects of crime scene investigation as relating to entomology.

The facilities for entomology at Texas A&M include the Heep Center, housing the Department of Entomology, the Entomology Research Laboratory, the Biological Control Facility, as well as the USDA Entomology Research Facility. The Science of Forensic Entomology course presents students with a closer look at insects as applied to forensics, with a focus on investigations, and their impact in the court of law. Applied Forensic Entomology is the corresponding lab to the previous class with hands-on application of practices involved in investigations of human and animals deaths.

=== Michigan State University ===
Michigan State University offers an educational tour at a facility they call the "Bug House". The Bug House tours present audiences with information about bugs.

=== University of California, Davis ===
Faculty and graduate students in the Entomology Department at UC Davis have contributed to local and national forensic investigations as well as general research and leadership in forensic entomology. The resources and services at the Bohart Museum of Entomology are also typically used in support of these activities. A minor degree program in forensic entomology is currently offered through the Department of Entomology. Professor-researcher Robert B. Kimsey is the current president-elect of the North American Forensic Entomology Association and regularly teaches ENT 158, Forensic Entomology, which is offered during the spring quarter.

== Organizations ==
=== Australian Entomological Society ===
The Australian Entomological Society (AES) now with more than six hundred members, is one of the most prevalent biological science organizations in Australia. AES began August 17, 1965 and had its first public meeting in Melbourne in January 1967. The meeting was coordinated by Ian Mackerras, who put forth four important goals to inspire the success of the AES, these goals included: "Acquiring wealth, setting a high attainable standard of excellence, having a clear central purpose and source of inspiration, and finally existing as a group for what the group can give back to society, not what it can get" (from the AES Website).Now led by current president Phil Weinstein (2017), AES members consists of about seventy-five percent professionals and around twenty five percent amateurs. Membership is not restricted to any one person they just have to be interested in the study of insects. A person must also gain two nominations by financial members to finally be inducted into the group. The AES includes a number of affiliates such as, The Entomological Society of Queensland, The entomological Society of New South Wales, and The Entomological Society of Victoria. The AES also consists of business firms who have sustained membership.

The AES bestows itself on teaching the adolescence of Australia about entomology. Student members of the AES are able to get together with well-known entomologists to help familiarize themselves with issues pertaining to entomology. Such meetings help to further the early entomologists career. The AES awards prizes and even research grants for the young entrepreneur. The Phil Carne Prize is intent on recognizing superior research on entomological issues. The Phil Carne Prize is restricted to those attending or enrolled in an Australian University, however the entrants do not have to be a member of the AES to obtain this prestiges award. The only requirement the writer must abide by is, their topic must relate to an entomological topic.

The AES has many objectives in their role of the advancement of knowledge in the entomological field. The objectives are met by publishing a journal, a report to all members and affiliates, scientific seminars, research grants, and awards for different contests. Different competitions are offered to better the knowledge of members and non-members in the entomology field. For example, an illustration and photographic competition is held annually. This contest is said to promote and acknowledge excellence for entomological illustrations. This contest includes three categories the student illustration section, the open illustration section, and the photographic section. Awards given out by the AES include the Mackerras medal which is given out every two years. The recipient must be under age fifty and had “demonstrated excellence: in entomology. Honorary life awards also recognize those with outstanding achievements, some recipients include” Dr. Bruce Champ, Dr. Gordon Hooper, Dr. Fred J.D McDonald, and Dr. Courtenay N. Smithers.

Two of the AES’s important publications include the Austral Entomology and Myrmecia. The Australian Journal of Entomology is what the AES call its "Flagship publication". This Journal promotes the study of biology, ecology, taxonomy, and control of insects and arachnids within Australia. The journal has been known to publish original, peer reviewed research, and many other forms of articles. The journal's current editor-in-chief is Dr. Michael Braby. The internal publication Myrmecia is produced quarterly. This publication reports on the activities and research projects of the group and new members who have just recently joined Myrmecia's editor; its chief is Dr. Sonya Broughton.

=== Overseas Chinese Entomologists Association ===
OCEA, Overseas Chinese Entomologists Association (http://www.go-to-ocea.org), is a non-profit organization. OCEA is set up to help interactions and cooperation among Chinese entomologists around the world. OCEA also helps in providing job opportunities as well as research institutions in China. It was first established in 1988 and holds an annual meeting each year, which takes place during the annual meeting of the Entomological Society of America.

OCEA is now expanding its network to more individuals as well as other organizations to aid in the advancement of the science of entomology. Many Chinese and non-Chinese entomologists work closely together to exchange information related to the science of entomology, this is especially true for the entomologist in the U.S.

OCEA is composed of volunteers and its membership is unrestricted. Anyone who is applying for membership will have to agree to the OCEA Bylaws and pay an annual membership fee. All members have equal status and all have the right to participate in elections (to elect or to be elected) for any elected office. OCEA members also have the right to freely express opinions, make proposals, enjoy all privileges and benefits that OCEA may offer and of course the right to vote in the decision-making process. OCEA members must follow the rules and regulations and abide by the procedures of democratic operations. Currently, OCEA has around 200 members.

The executive board and the advisory board govern OCEA. The executive board is composed of the president, the president-elect, the immediate-past president, the treasurer and the secretary. The president shall serve as the chair of the board. The term of the president shall be one year with re-election for a maximum of two consecutive terms. The treasurer shall collect, receive, and be in charge of all the funds of OCEA and file IRS forms. The secretary shall keep and archive all OCEA documents including the Bylaws, brochures, and resolutions. The president for the year 2008 is Qisheng Song from the Department of Entomology at the University of Missouri. The vice president and president elect is Qingquan (Quentin) Fang from the Department of Biology at Georgia Southern University. The past president (2007) was Qing-He Zhang.

=== European Association for Forensic Entomology ===
EAFE, European Association for Forensic Entomology, was founded in 2002 and vastly growing in size. There are close to about 100 members and 41 associate members. The aim of EAFE is to encourage the advancement of forensic entomology all through Europe and to encourage co-operation with related international bodies. According to EAFE, “This growth reflects the growing interest by the forensic and entomological community in forensic entomology, but at the same time highlights the need for guidelines for the science and support for it from an association like EAFE". EAFE provides its services as a professional partner for police and legal authorities. EAFE holds regular meetings and workshops in order to raise awareness and knowledge of their science.

The annual meeting are held in order to advance education and training, as well as to fine tune the framework of the association i.e. Constitution, membership, etc.

In order to become a member of EAFE one must meet certain criteria such as their profession. You must be a qualified scientist, pathologist or someone with a medical or forensic background who is readily active in the field of entomology. One must also be within the EU. For anyone who does not fall within these criteria an Associate Membership status is open to people who are willing to contribute to the work of EAFE. Also membership is on a personal basis.

The board governs the EAFE, and is composed of 4 officers and 2 members. One president, one vice president, one secretary, one organizer and 2 members. Jens Amendt is currently (as of 2008) the president of E.A.F.E. The president shall be elected for 1 year with a possibility to be re-elected each year. The other members but the organizer of the next meeting shall be elected for two years with a possibility to be re-elected.

The EAFE website includes large amounts of information for anyone who is interested in the field of entomology. Specifically they have links to websites that will aid in the identification of insects, mainly Diptera. More features are available to members only.

=== North American Forensic Entomology Association ===
NAFEA hosts annual meeting on the field.

== Conclusion ==
The number of schools and organizations associated with forensic entomology is growing, making homicides and other manors of human deaths easier to be solved. The escalating numbers of universities that study forensic entomology constantly contribute their research to forensic entomologists to help aid them in solving crimes. The organizations worldwide promote the study of entomology by targeting younger people in hopes of further increasing the number of forensic entomologists.

== See also ==
- Forensic Science
