= George Henry Horn =

American entomologist (1840–1897)

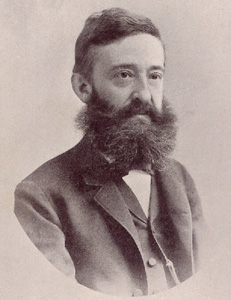
- Born: April 7, 1840; Philadelphia, Pennsylvania
- Died: November 24, 1897 (aged 57); Beesley's Point, New Jersey
- Education: University of Pennsylvania
- Scientific career
- Fields: Entomology
- Workplaces: American Entomological Society

George Henry Horn (April 7, 1840 – November 24, 1897) was an American entomologist who specialized in the study of beetles.

== Biography ==
Born in Philadelphia on April 7, 1840, Horn attended the University of Pennsylvania, from which he graduated with a degree in medicine in 1861. From 1862 to 1866, he served in the American Civil War as surgeon to the infantry of the California Volunteers, during which time he collected insects extensively in California, Arizona, and New Mexico. He then returned to Philadelphia, where he established a medical practice, specializing in obstetrics, and was elected president of the Entomological Society of Philadelphia, the predecessor of the American Entomological Society. He would remain president of the latter society until his death.

He was elected as a member of the American Philosophical Society in 1869 and was the librarian and one of the secretaries of the society at the time of his death.

Working with the collection he had made during his service in the West, he published "more than 150 important papers, in addition to very many minor notes; in these papers about 150 genera and more than 1550 species are defined". He bequeathed his collections of insects to the American Entomological Society; they are now in the Museum of Comparative Zoology at Harvard University.

Most of Horn's work was written from a "monographic, systematic standpoint", and included an abundance of comparative analyses between different orders, suborders, and families of beetle. In particular, Horn's legacy included an abundance of observational data on the Carabidae and Silphidae families of beetles, also known respectively as ground beetles and carrion beetles.

According to the entomologist Neal Evenhuis,

Horn's taxonomy was almost beyond reproach, and this was no doubt due to careful and deliberate study of specimens while comparing them to types. Horn made it a point to travel to European museums, attend foreign entomological society meetings, and study type material firsthand.

Throughout his career, he worked closely with John Lawrence LeConte, most notably as coauthor of the revised and expanded 1883 edition of LeConte's then-standard Classification of the Coleoptera of North America; and after LeConte's death Horn was recognized as "easily the most eminent investigator in his chosen line of work".
