= Sternacutus =

Scientific classification
- Domain: Eukaryota
- Kingdom: Animalia
- Phylum: Arthropoda
- Class: Insecta
- Order: Coleoptera
- Suborder: Polyphaga
- Infraorder: Cucujiformia
- Family: Cerambycidae
- Tribe: Acanthocinini
- Genus: Sternacutus; Gilmour, 1962

Synonyms
- Acarinozineus Gilmour, 1962

Genus of beetles

Sternacutus is a genus of beetles in the family Cerambycidae, containing the following species:

- Sternacutus achirae (Monné & Monné, 2012)
- Sternacutus albidus (Monné, 2009)
- Sternacutus alienus (Melzer, 1932)
- Sternacutus angulistigma (Bates, 1885)
- Sternacutus annulicornis (White, 1855)
- Sternacutus argus (Monné & Monné, 2012)
- Sternacutus arietinus (Bates, 1872)
- Sternacutus barbiflavus (Martins & Monné, 1974)
- Sternacutus bicristatus (Melzer, 1935)
- Sternacutus caliginosus (Monné & Monné, 2012)
- Sternacutus cinerascens (Bates, 1863)
- Sternacutus cretatus (Monné & Martins, 1976)
- Sternacutus cribripennis (Bates, 1885)
- Sternacutus dimidiatus (Aurivillius, 1922)
- Sternacutus doctus (Bates, 1863)
- Sternacutus dorsalis (Melzer, 1935)
- Sternacutus griseostigma (Monné & Monné, 2012)
- Sternacutus guttatus (Monné & Martins, 1976)
- Sternacutus jubapennis (Fisher, 1938)
- Sternacutus lateralis (Monné & Martins, 1976)
- Sternacutus moestus (Bates, 1885)
- Sternacutus mysticus (Bates, 1863)
- Sternacutus nyssodroides (Tippmann, 1960)
- Sternacutus orbiculus (Monné & Martins, 1976)
- Sternacutus spinicornis (Gilmour, 1962)
- Sternacutus striatus (Gilmour, 1962)
- Sternacutus strigosus (Bates, 1863)
- Sternacutus torquatus (Bates, 1881)
- Sternacutus zikani (Melzer, 1935)
