= Israel Journal of Entomology =

- Discipline: Entomology
- Language: English
- Edited by: M.B. Mostovski

Publication details
- History: 1966–present
- Publisher: Entomological Society of Israel (Israel)
- Frequency: Continuous
- Open access: Yes
- License: CC BY-NC-ND 4.0

Standard abbreviations
- ISO 4: Isr. J. Entomol.

Indexing
- CODEN: IJENB9
- ISSN: 0075-1243 (print); 2224-6304 (web)
- LCCN: he67001638
- OCLC no.: 60619007

Links
- Journal homepage; Online access

The Israel Journal of Entomology is a peer-reviewed open access scientific journal covering all areas of entomology, with a worldwide scope. Besides insects, it also covers non-marine Crustacea and Chelicerata. The journal's printed version is produced annually. The journal was established in 1966 and is published by the Entomological Society of Israel. The editor-in-chief is Mike Mostovski (Tel Aviv University and University of KwaZulu-Natal).

== Abstracting and indexing ==
The journal is abstracted and indexed in:

- Biological Abstracts
- BIOSIS Previews
- CAB Abstracts
- EBSCO databases
- Scopus
- The Zoological Record

== See also ==
- List of entomology journals
