= A Practical Handbook of British Beetles =

- A Practical Handbook of British Beetles vol. 1 (1997 reprint)
- Author: Norman H. Joy
- Language: English
- Subject: Entomology
- Published: 1932
- Publisher: H. F. & G. Witherby
- ISBN: 0-900848-91-X

A Practical Handbook of British Beetles ISBN 0-900848-91-X is a two-volume work on the British beetle fauna, by Norman H. Joy, first published by H. F. & G. Witherby in January 1932.

== Contents ==
Volume one (xxviii + 622 pages) consists of the text (largely a set of identification keys, with brief status notes for each species). Volume two (194 pages) contains 2040 line-drawings of whole beetles and features referred to in the keys (390 of these were taken from Spry and Shuckard's 1840 publication The British Coleoptera Delineated but the remainder were drawn by Joy).

The book covers a fauna of about 3560 different species and has an emphasis on species identification, being "essentially a manual of identification for the use of collectors."

A reduced-size reprint was produced by E. W. Classey in 1976, and again in 1997, while Pisces Conservation released an electronic version in 2009, solving a longstanding problem of availability.

== Reception ==
One of the main points of attraction for Joy's book was its reasonable price. According to a 1932 review in Nature, William Weekes Fowler's standard work The Coleoptera of the British Islands (1887–1891, 1913) was "beyond the means of most students and collectors of insects", while A Practical Handbook offered a much more affordable option.

== Legacy ==
A Practical Handbook of British Beetles instantly became one of the important works on British coleoptera, already being referred to as a classic by the 1956 Handbooks for the Identification of British Insects volume on beetles, which uses it as one of the major works to be cross-referenced.

Despite its age, it has remained the standard work on the identification of British beetles into the 21st century, although the British Entomological and Natural History Society produced a companion volume, New British Beetles - species not in Joy's practical handbook by Peter J. Hodge and Richard A. Jones in 1995. British coleopterists refer to the book colloquially simply as "Joy".
