= Sternacutus alienus =

Scientific classification
- Kingdom: Animalia
- Phylum: Arthropoda
- Class: Insecta
- Order: Coleoptera
- Suborder: Polyphaga
- Infraorder: Cucujiformia
- Family: Cerambycidae
- Genus: Sternacutus
- Species: S. alienus

Binomial name
- Sternacutus alienus (Melzer, 1932)

Species of beetle

Sternacutus alienus is a species of beetle in the family Cerambycidae. It was described by Melzer in 1932.
