= Journal of Insect Behavior =

Peer-reviewed scientific journal

- Discipline: Zoology
- Language: English
- Edited by: Jeremy Allison, Ring Cardé

Publication details
- History: 1988-present
- Publisher: Springer Science+Business Media
- Frequency: Bimonthly
- Open access: Hybrid
- Impact factor: 1.038 (2021)

Standard abbreviations
- ISO 4: J. Insect Behav.

Indexing
- CODEN: JIBEE8
- ISSN: 0892-7553 (print); 1572-8889 (web)
- LCCN: 2004233354
- OCLC no.: 67301505

Links
- Journal homepage; Online archive

Journal of Insect Behavior is a bimonthly peer-reviewed scientific journal covering various aspects of insect research. It is published by Springer Science+Business Media and was established in 1988. The editors-in-chief are Jeremy Allison (University of Pretoria) and Ring Cardé (University of California).

The journal publishes research articles, reviews, and commentaries related to various aspects of the behavior of insects, including behavioral ecology, spiders, and isopods.

== Abstracting and indexing ==
The journal is abstracted and indexed in:

- Biological Abstracts
- BIOSIS Previews
- CAB Abstracts
- Current Contents/Agriculture, Biology & Environmental Sciences
- EBSCO databases
- ProQuest databases
- Science Citation Index Expanded
- Scopus

According to the Journal Citation Reports, the journal has a 2021 impact factor of 1.038.
