= Sternacutus spinicornis =

Scientific classification
- Domain: Eukaryota
- Kingdom: Animalia
- Phylum: Arthropoda
- Class: Insecta
- Order: Coleoptera
- Suborder: Polyphaga
- Infraorder: Cucujiformia
- Family: Cerambycidae
- Genus: Sternacutus
- Species: S. spinicornis

Binomial name
- Sternacutus spinicornis (Gilmour, 1962)

Species of beetle

Sternacutus spinicornis is a species of beetle in the family Cerambycidae. It was described by Gilmour in 1962.
