= Sternacutus dorsalis =

Scientific classification
- Kingdom: Animalia
- Phylum: Arthropoda
- Class: Insecta
- Order: Coleoptera
- Suborder: Polyphaga
- Infraorder: Cucujiformia
- Family: Cerambycidae
- Genus: Sternacutus
- Species: S. dorsalis

Binomial name
- Sternacutus dorsalis (Melzer, 1935)

Species of beetle

Sternacutus dorsalis is a species of beetle in the family Cerambycidae. It was described by Melzer in 1935.
