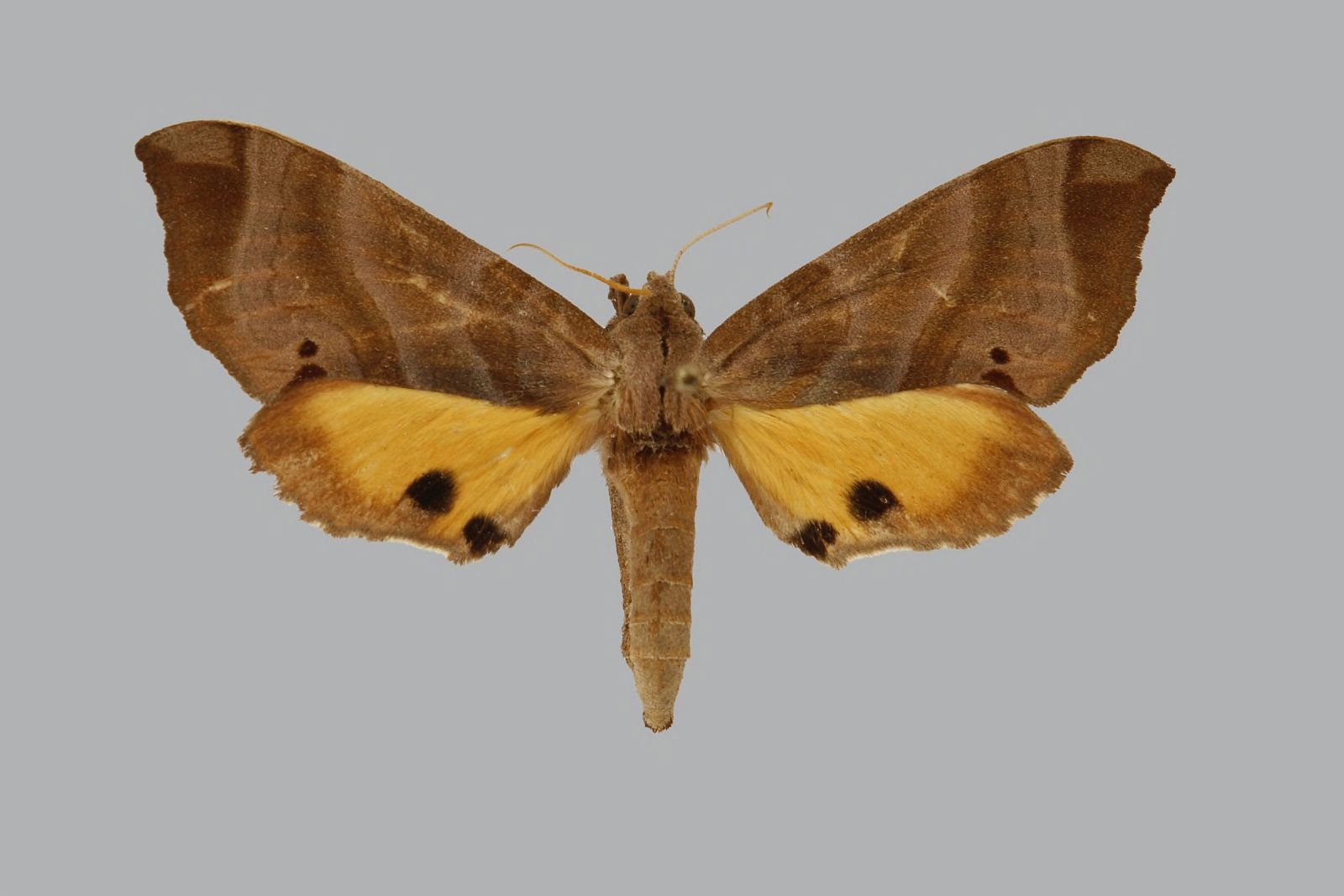

Scientific classification
- Domain: Eukaryota
- Kingdom: Animalia
- Phylum: Arthropoda
- Class: Insecta
- Order: Lepidoptera
- Family: Sphingidae
- Genus: Gynoeryx
- Species: G. brevis

Binomial name
- Gynoeryx brevis (Oberthur, 1909)

Synonyms
- Polyptychus brevis Oberthür, 1909

= Gynoeryx brevis =

Species of moth

Gynoeryx brevis is a moth of the family Sphingidae. It is known from Madagascar.
