= Systematic Entomology =

- Discipline: Entomology
- Language: English
- Edited by: Shaun L. Winterton, Christiane Weirauch, Bonnie B. Blaimer, Marianne Espeland

Publication details
- Former names: Stylops: a Journal of Taxonomic Entomology; Proceedings of the Royal Entomological Society of London, Series B: Taxonomy; Journal of Entomology, Series B: Taxonomy
- History: 1932–present
- Publisher: Wiley-Blackwell on behalf of the Royal Entomological Society of London (United Kingdom)
- Frequency: Quarterly
- Impact factor: 3.844 (2020)

Standard abbreviations
- ISO 4: Syst. Entomol.

Indexing
- ISSN: 0307-6970 (print); 1365-3113 (web)
- OCLC no.: 45259668

Links
- Journal homepage

Systematic Entomology is a scientific journal covering the field of systematic entomology, published by the Royal Entomological Society of London. Having begun in 1932 as Stylops: A Journal of Taxonomic Entomology, the title was changed to Proceedings of the Royal Entomological Society of London, Series B: Taxonomy in 1936, starting with volume 5, and then changed again to Journal of Entomology, Series B: Taxonomy in 1971, starting with volume 40. After volume 44 in 1976, the journal became Systematic Entomology, starting again with volume 1.

According to the Journal Citation Reports, the journal has a 2020 impact factor of 3.844. It is indexed in the following bibliographic databases:

- Academic Search
- AGRICOLA
- Aquatic Sciences and Fisheries Abstracts
- BIOBASE
- Biological Abstracts
- BIOSIS Previews
- CAB Direct
- CSA Biological Sciences Database
- CSA Environmental Sciences & Pollution Management Database
- Current Contents
- EMBiology
- IBIDS
- InfoTrac
- Journal Citation Reports
- Science Citation Index
- The Zoological Record

== See also ==
- List of entomology journals
