= Sternacutus dimidiatus =

Scientific classification
- Domain: Eukaryota
- Kingdom: Animalia
- Phylum: Arthropoda
- Class: Insecta
- Order: Coleoptera
- Suborder: Polyphaga
- Infraorder: Cucujiformia
- Family: Cerambycidae
- Genus: Sternacutus
- Species: S. dimidiatus

Binomial name
- Sternacutus dimidiatus (Aurivillius, 1922)

Species of beetle

Sternacutus dimidiatus is a species of beetle in the family Cerambycidae. It was described by Per Olof Christopher Aurivillius in 1922.
