= Sternacutus lateralis =

Scientific classification
- Domain: Eukaryota
- Kingdom: Animalia
- Phylum: Arthropoda
- Class: Insecta
- Order: Coleoptera
- Suborder: Polyphaga
- Infraorder: Cucujiformia
- Family: Cerambycidae
- Genus: Sternacutus
- Species: S. lateralis

Binomial name
- Sternacutus lateralis (Monné & Martins, 1976)

Species of beetle

Sternacutus lateralis is a species of beetle in the family Cerambycidae. It was described by Monné and Martins in 1976.
