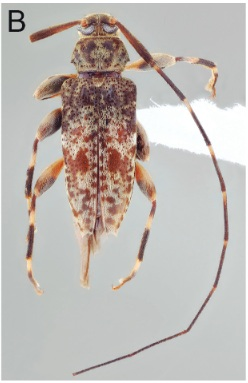

Scientific classification
- Kingdom: Animalia
- Phylum: Arthropoda
- Clade: Pancrustacea
- Class: Insecta
- Order: Coleoptera
- Suborder: Polyphaga
- Infraorder: Cucujiformia
- Family: Cerambycidae
- Genus: Sternacutus
- Species: S. jubapennis

Binomial name
- Sternacutus jubapennis (Fisher, 1938)

= Sternacutus jubapennis =

Species of beetle

Sternacutus jubapennis is a species of beetle in the family Cerambycidae. It was described by Fisher in 1938. It is found in Brazil (São Paulo, Paraná, Santa Catarina) and Paraguay.
