= Robert Herbert Carcasson =

English entomologist

Robert Herbert Carcasson (5 December 1918 in Cheltenham, UK – 23 September 1982 in Victoria, B.C., Canada) was an English entomologist who specialised in butterflies, but also authored two field guides to tropical fishes. He joined the Coryndon Museum, Nairobi, as senior entomologist in 1956. He then became its director, under the museum's new name of the Natural History Museum from 1961 to 1968. During this time, he was awarded a PhD for his studies on African hawkmoths. From 1969 to 1971 he was Chief Curator of the Centennial Museum, Vancouver, Canada. In 1972 he travelled in Polynesia, Melanesia, Australia, Malaysia, Sri Lanka, Seychelles and East Africa for production of two field guides to coral reef fish of the Indo-Pacific region. From 1973 to 1979 he was Curator of Entomology at the Museum of British Columbia. He died of cancer. Somewhat of a polymath, he was fluent in a number of languages, and produced the illustrations to a number of his works, culminating in hundreds of colour and line drawings of fishes for his reef fish field guides.

== Works ==
- (1961) "The Acraea butterflies of East Africa (Lepidoptera, Acraeidae)". Journal of the East Africa Natural History Society Special Supplement No 8
- (1963) "The Milkweed butterflies of East Africa (Lepidoptera, Danaidae)". Journal of the East Africa Natural History Society volume XXIV No.2 (106)
- (1964) "A preliminary survey of the zoogeography of African butterflies". East African Wildlife Journal 2: 122-157.
- (1968) The Sphingidae (Hawk Moths) of Eastern Africa. PhD thesis. pp. 233. Nairobi: University of East Africa.
- (1975) The Swallowtail Butterflies of East Africa (Lepidoptera, Papilionidae). E. W. Classey Ltd. pdf
- (1976) Revised Catalogue of the African Sphingidae (Lepidoptera) with Descriptions of the East African Species. Second edition. Faringdon, Oxen: E.W. Classey Ltd.
- (1977) A field guide to the reef fishes of tropical Australia and the Indo-Pacific region. London: Collins.
- (1977) A field guide to the coral reef fishes of the Indian and West Pacific Oceans. London: Collins.
- (1980) Collins Handguide to the Butterflies of Africa. Collins: London

A further collection of Carcasson's works may be found in the Biodiversity Heritage Library online.
