= Gynoeryx teteforti =

Scientific classification
- Domain: Eukaryota
- Kingdom: Animalia
- Phylum: Arthropoda
- Class: Insecta
- Order: Lepidoptera
- Family: Sphingidae
- Genus: Gynoeryx
- Species: G. teteforti

Binomial name
- Gynoeryx teteforti (Griveaud, 1964)

Synonyms
- Polyptychus teteforti Griveaud, 1964

Species of moth

Gynoeryx teteforti is a moth of the family Sphingidae. It is known from Madagascar.
