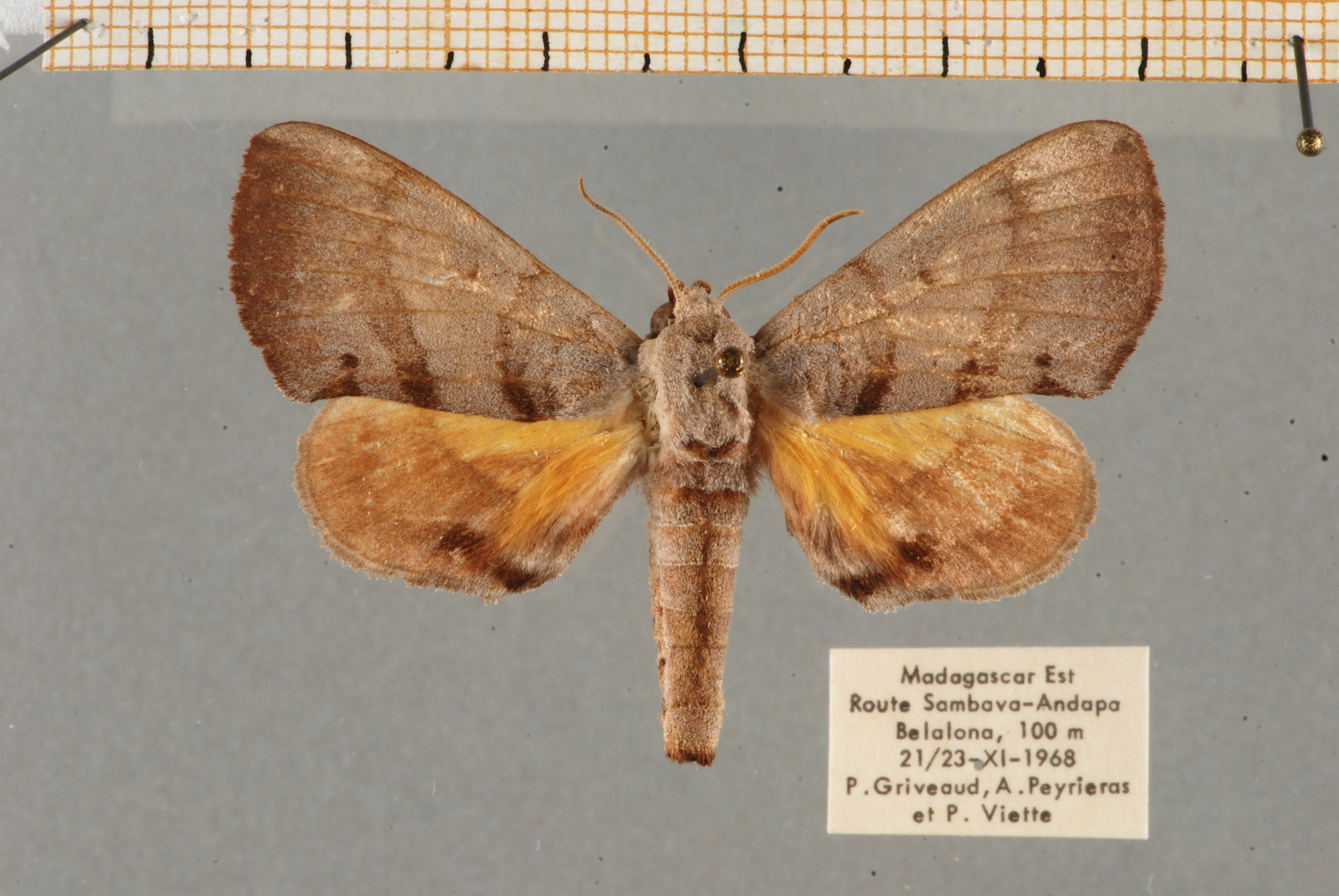

Scientific classification
- Domain: Eukaryota
- Kingdom: Animalia
- Phylum: Arthropoda
- Class: Insecta
- Order: Lepidoptera
- Family: Sphingidae
- Genus: Gynoeryx
- Species: G. bilineatus

Binomial name
- Gynoeryx bilineatus (Griveaud, 1959)

Synonyms
- Polyptychus bilineatus Griveaud, 1959

= Gynoeryx bilineatus =

Species of moth

Gynoeryx bilineatus is a moth of the family Sphingidae. It is known from Madagascar.
