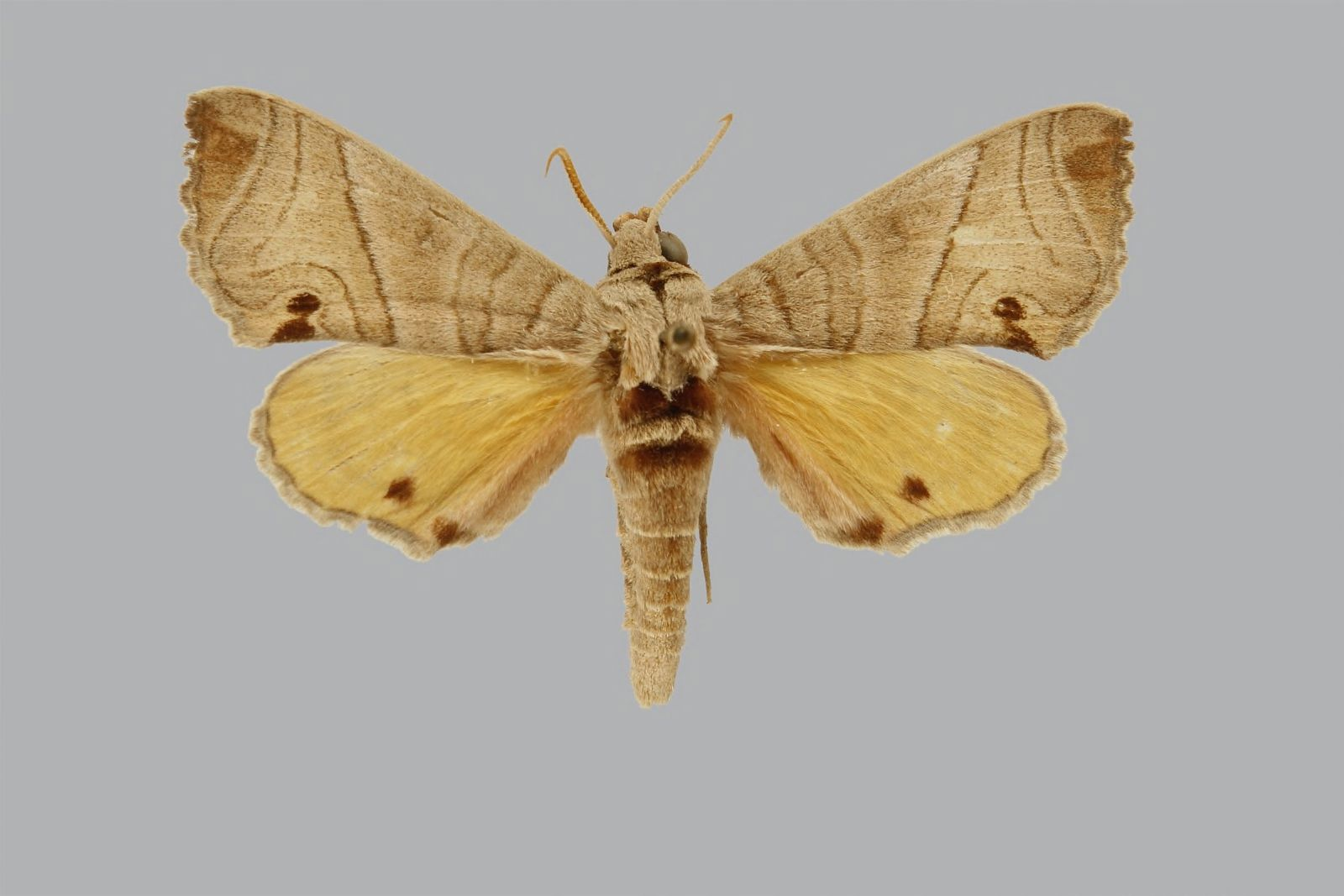

Scientific classification
- Domain: Eukaryota
- Kingdom: Animalia
- Phylum: Arthropoda
- Class: Insecta
- Order: Lepidoptera
- Family: Sphingidae
- Genus: Gynoeryx
- Species: G. paulianii

Binomial name
- Gynoeryx paulianii (Viette, 1956)

Synonyms
- Polyptychus paulianii Viette, 1956

= Gynoeryx paulianii =

Species of moth

Gynoeryx paulianii is a moth of the family Sphingidae. It is known from Madagascar.
