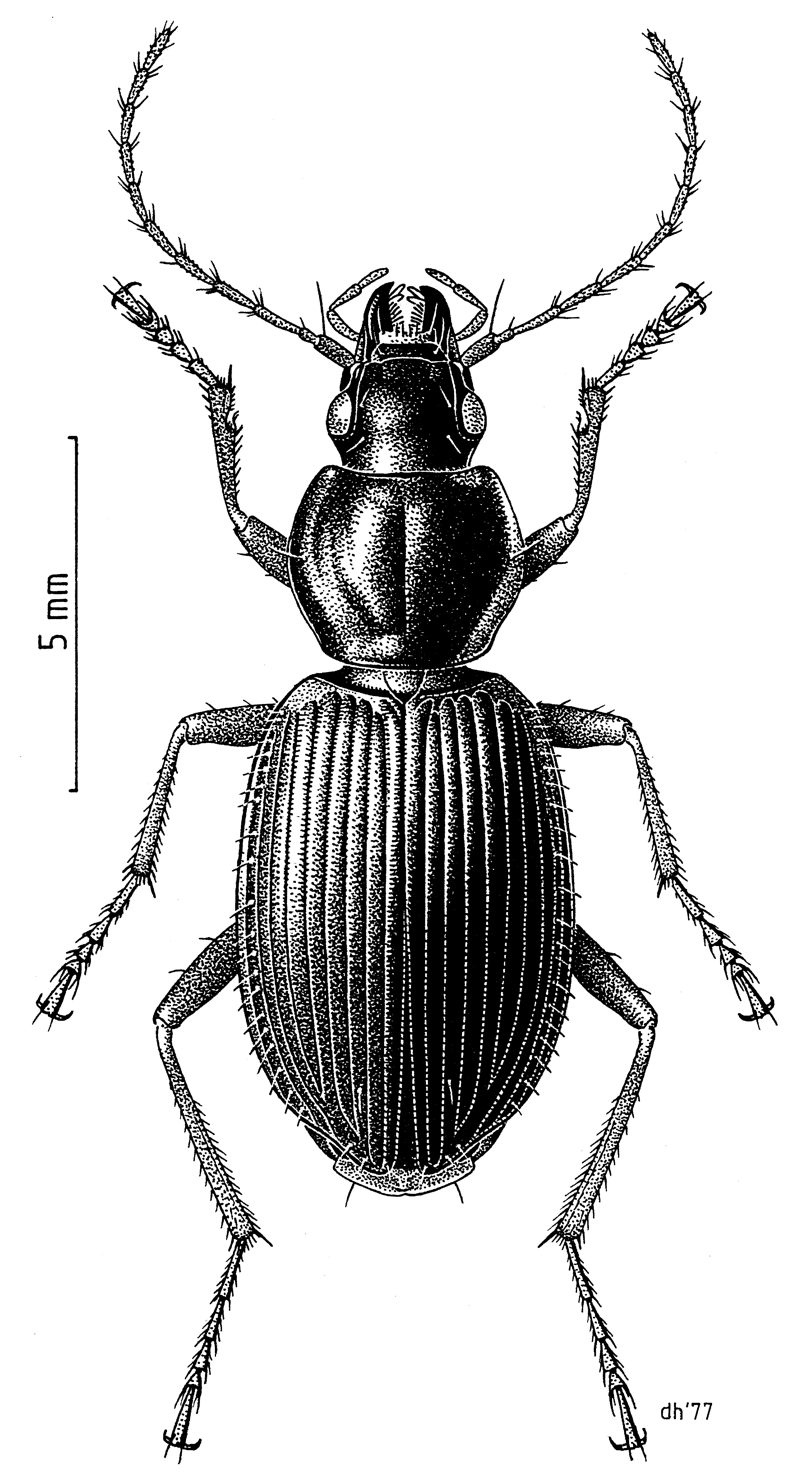
- Ctenognathus novaezelandiae illustration by Des Helmore

Scientific classification
- Kingdom: Animalia
- Phylum: Arthropoda
- Class: Insecta
- Order: Coleoptera
- Suborder: Adephaga
- Family: Carabidae
- Subfamily: Platyninae
- Tribe: Platynini
- Subtribe: Platynina
- Genus: Ctenognathus; Fairmaire, 1843

= Ctenognathus =

Genus of beetles

Ctenognathus is a genus of beetles in the family Carabidae. This genus is endemic to New Zealand. It was first described by Léon Fairmaire in 1843.

== Species ==
Ctenognathus contains the following twenty-five species:

- Ctenognathus adamsi (Broun, 1886)
- Ctenognathus arnaudensis (Broun, 1921)
- Ctenognathus cardiophorus (Chaudoir, 1878)
- Ctenognathus colensonis (White, 1846)
- Ctenognathus davidsoni Larochelle & Larivière, 2021
- Ctenognathus earlyi Larochelle & Larivière, 2021
- Ctenognathus edwardsii (Bates, 1874)
- Ctenognathus elevatus (White, 1846)
- Ctenognathus garnerae Larochelle & Larivière, 2021
- Ctenognathus helmsi (Sharp, 1881)
- Ctenognathus hoarei Larochelle & Larivière, 2021
- Ctenognathus intermedius (Broun, 1908)
- Ctenognathus kaikoura Larochelle & Larivière, 2021
- Ctenognathus marieclaudiae Larochelle, 2021
- Ctenognathus novaezelandiae (Fairmaire, 1843)
- Ctenognathus oreobius (Broun, 1886)
- Ctenognathus otagoensis (Bates, 1878)
- Ctenognathus perumalae Larochelle & Larivière, 2021
- Ctenognathus pictonensis Sharp, 1886
- Ctenognathus sandageri (Broun, 1882)
- Ctenognathus takahe Larochelle & Larivière, 2021
- Ctenognathus tawanui Larochelle & Larivière, 2021
- Ctenognathus tepaki Larochelle & Larivière, 2021
- Ctenognathus urewera Larochelle & Larivière, 2021
- Ctenognathus xanthomelas (Broun, 1908)
