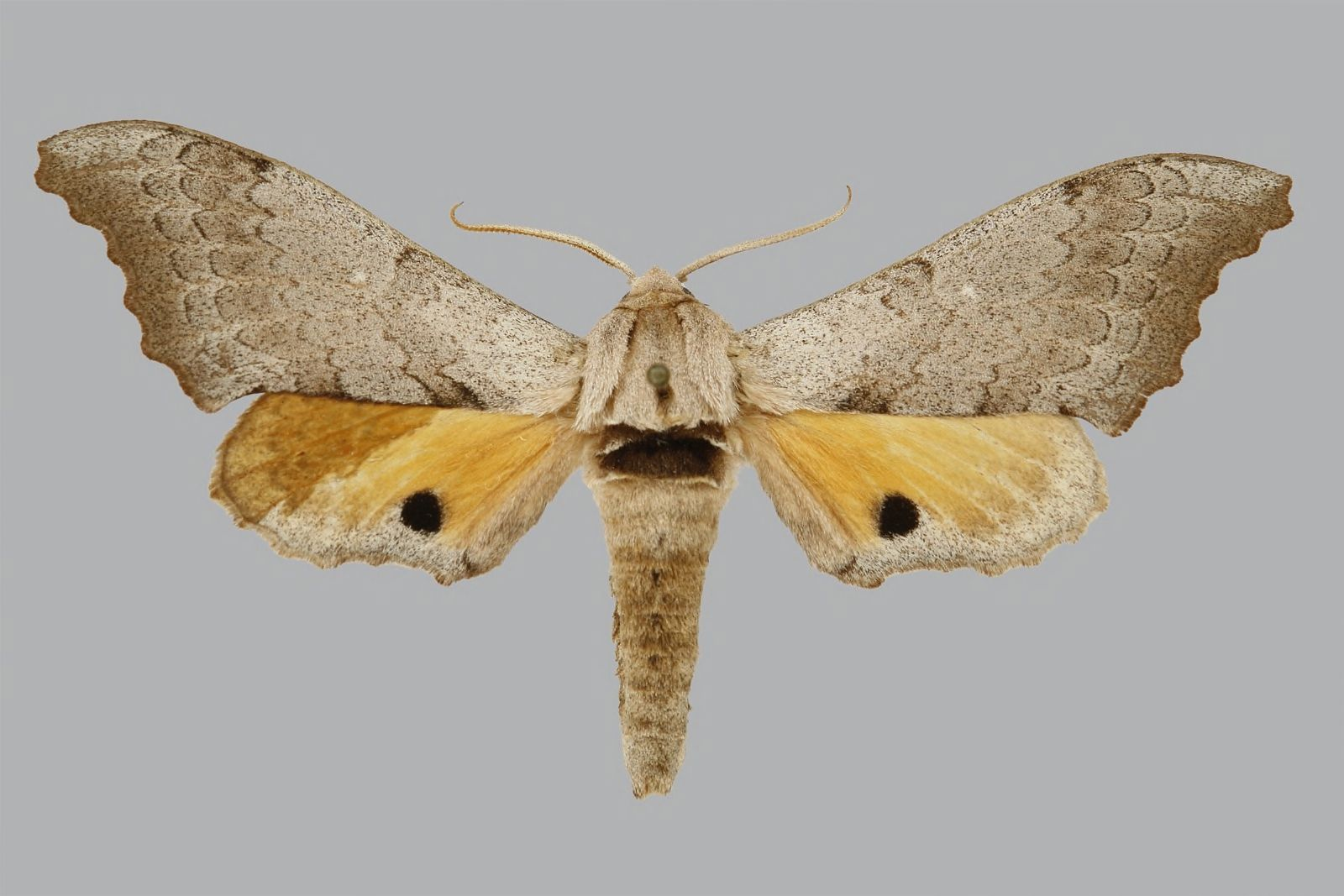

Scientific classification
- Domain: Eukaryota
- Kingdom: Animalia
- Phylum: Arthropoda
- Class: Insecta
- Order: Lepidoptera
- Family: Sphingidae
- Genus: Gynoeryx
- Species: G. integer

Binomial name
- Gynoeryx integer (Viette, 1956)

Synonyms
- Polyptychus integer Viette, 1956; Polyptychus integer nigropuncta (Griveaud, 1964)

= Gynoeryx integer =

Species of moth

Gynoeryx integer is a moth of the family Sphingidae. It is known from Madagascar.
