= Sternacutus cribripennis =

Scientific classification
- Kingdom: Animalia
- Phylum: Arthropoda
- Class: Insecta
- Order: Coleoptera
- Suborder: Polyphaga
- Infraorder: Cucujiformia
- Family: Cerambycidae
- Genus: Sternacutus
- Species: S. cribripennis

Binomial name
- Sternacutus cribripennis (Bates, 1885)

Species of beetle

Sternacutus cribripennis is a species of beetle in the family Cerambycidae. It was described by Bates in 1885. It can be found in the Chiriquí Province of Panama.
