= Sternacutus torquatus =

Scientific classification
- Domain: Eukaryota
- Kingdom: Animalia
- Phylum: Arthropoda
- Class: Insecta
- Order: Coleoptera
- Suborder: Polyphaga
- Infraorder: Cucujiformia
- Family: Cerambycidae
- Genus: Sternacutus
- Species: S. torquatus

Binomial name
- Sternacutus torquatus (Bates, 1881)

Species of beetle

Sternacutus torquatus is a species of beetle in the family Cerambycidae. It was described by Bates in 1881.
