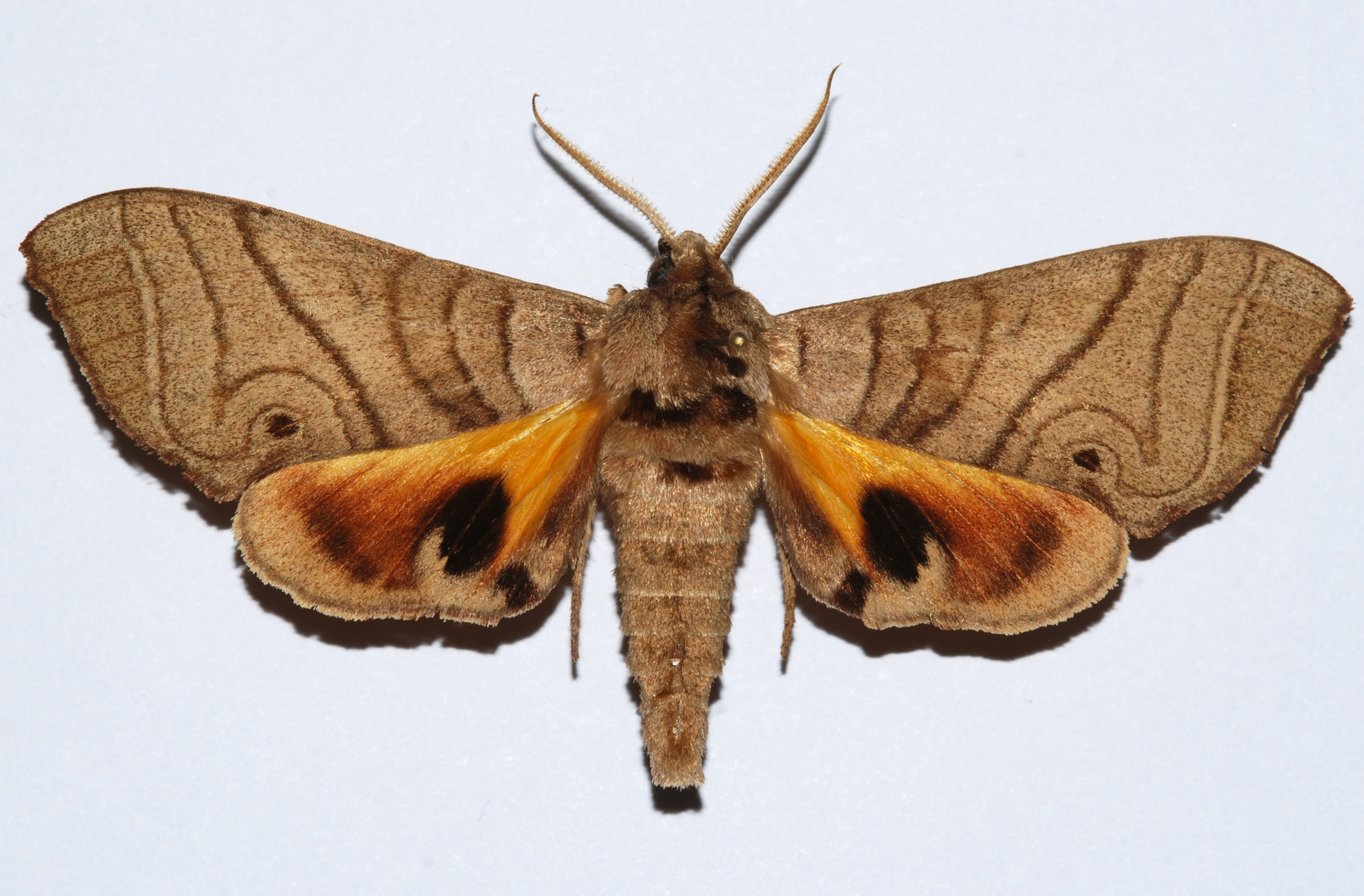

Scientific classification
- Domain: Eukaryota
- Kingdom: Animalia
- Phylum: Arthropoda
- Class: Insecta
- Order: Lepidoptera
- Family: Sphingidae
- Genus: Gynoeryx
- Species: G. meander

Binomial name
- Gynoeryx meander (Boisduval, 1875)

Synonyms
- Smerinthus meander Boisduval, 1875; Polyptychus meander maculalis (Griveaud, 1964)

= Gynoeryx meander =

Species of moth

Gynoeryx meander is a moth of the family Sphingidae. It is known from Madagascar.
