= Sternacutus doctus =

Scientific classification
- Domain: Eukaryota
- Kingdom: Animalia
- Phylum: Arthropoda
- Class: Insecta
- Order: Coleoptera
- Suborder: Polyphaga
- Infraorder: Cucujiformia
- Family: Cerambycidae
- Genus: Sternacutus
- Species: S. doctus

Binomial name
- Sternacutus doctus (Bates, 1863)

Species of beetle

Sternacutus doctus is a species of beetle in the family Cerambycidae. It was described by Bates in 1863.
