= Society of Southwestern Entomologists =

The Society of Southwestern Entomologists was founded as the Southwestern Entomological Society in 1976 with the objective of fostering entomological accomplishment in the southwestern United States and Mexico. The society's name was changed in 2003 to avoid confusion with the Southwestern Branch of the Entomological Society of America, with whom they meet annually. A primary function of the Society is the publication of the journal Southwestern Entomologist, published quarterly in March, June, September and December.
