= Priamus (journal) =

- Discipline: Entomology
- Language: Turkish, Uighur, English, German, and Chinese
- Edited by: Ahmet Ömer Koçak

Publication details
- History: 1981–present
- Publisher: Centre for Entomological Studies (Turkey)

Standard abbreviations
- ISO 4: Priamus

Indexing
- ISSN: 1015-8243
- OCLC no.: 406250558

Links
- Journal homepage

Priamus (ISSN 1015-8243) is a scientific journal published by the Centre for Entomological Studies, Ankara, Turkey. It was founded in 1981 and publishes research papers from the centre on topics including ecology, distribution, taxonomy, nomenclature and morphology of insects. News about the centre is also included. Priamus is a multilingual journal and appears in Turkish, Uighur, English, German, and Chinese. As of 2007, the editor in chief is Ahmet Ömer Koçak. From 2015 onwards, this journal is published online only.

A supplement publication, Priamus Supplement (ISSN 1015-8243), was started in 2006.

Both Priamus and Priamus Supplement are archived regularly at Internet Archive.
