= African Entomology =

- Discipline: Entomology
- Language: English

Publication details
- History: 1993–present
- Publisher: Entomological Society of Southern Africa (South Africa)
- Frequency: Biannual

Standard abbreviations
- ISO 4: Afr. Entomol.

Indexing
- ISSN: 1021-3589 (print); 2224-8854 (web)

Links
- Journal homepage

African Entomology is a scientific journal published by the Entomological Society of Southern Africa.
