= Asian Myrmecology =

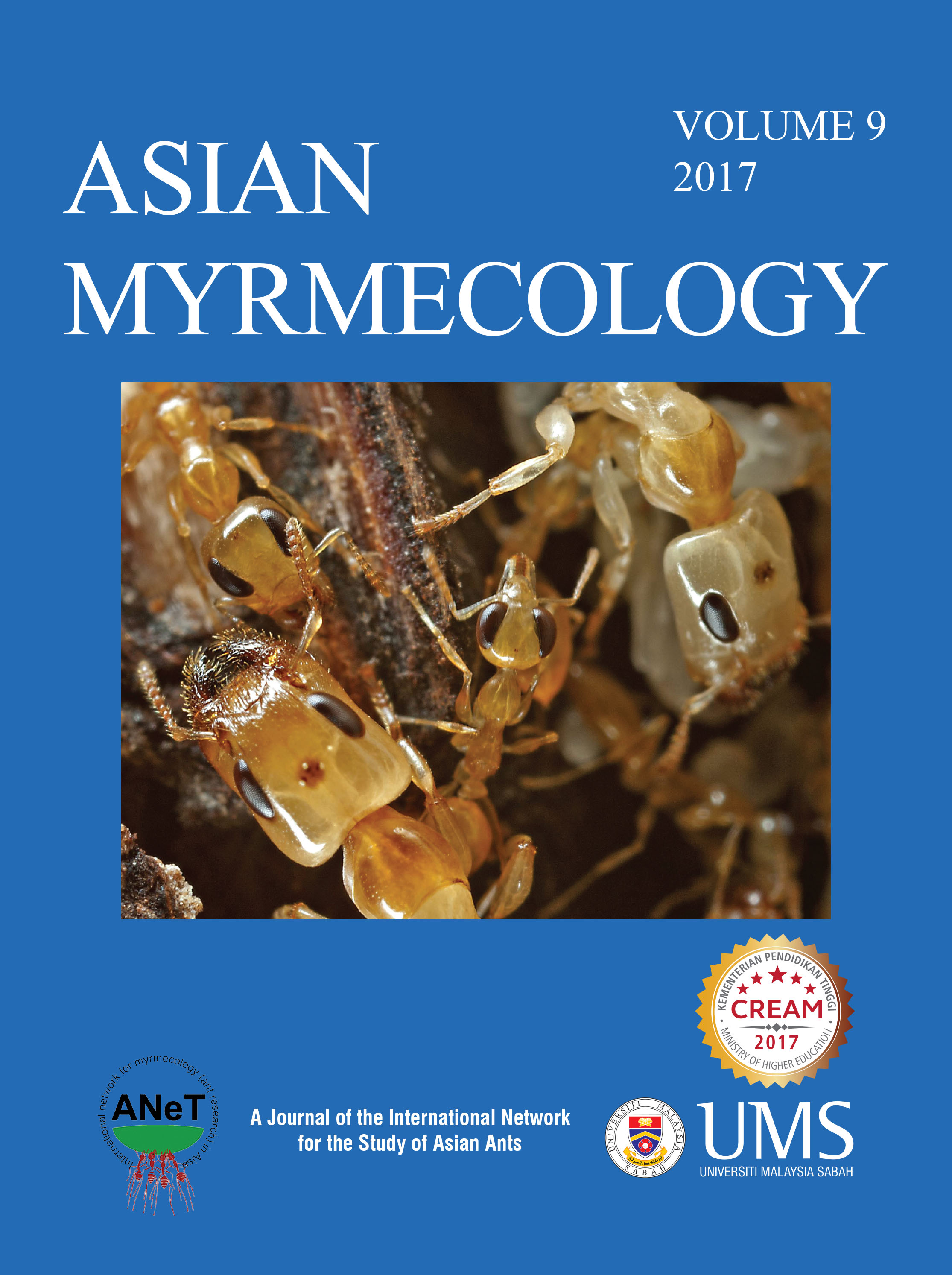
- Discipline: Entomology
- Language: English
- Edited by: Adam L. Cronin

Publication details
- History: 2007–present
- Publisher: Universiti Malaysia Sabah Press (Malaysia)
- Open access: Yes
- License: Creative Commons Attribution 4.0
- Impact factor: 0.429 (2018)

Standard abbreviations
- ISO 4: Asian Myrmecol.

Indexing
- ISSN: 1985-1944 (print); 2462-2362 (web)
- OCLC no.: 723957731

Links
- Journal homepage

Asian Myrmecology is a peer-reviewed open access scholarly journal publishing research on Asian myrmecology (ants). It is published by Universiti Malaysia Sabah Press and an official journal of the International Network for Myrmecology in Asia (ANeT). The current editor-in-chief is Adam L. Cronin.

In 2017, the journal won a Current Research in Malaysia (CREAM) award in recognition of commitment to quality, from the Malaysian Ministry of Higher Education. In 2018, a paper in this journal won the 'Best Journal Paper' award at the annual Malaysian Scholarly Publishing Council (MAPIM) awards.

== Abstracting and indexing ==
The journal is abstracted and indexed in:

- Scopus
- Science Citation Index Expanded
- Biological Abstracts
- BIOSIS Previews
- Current Contents/Agriculture, Biology & Environmental Sciences
- Zoological Record
