= Annales Zoologici =

- Discipline: Systematic zoology
- Language: English
- Edited by: Dariusz Iwan, Wioletta Tomaszewska, Marcin Jan Kamiński

Publication details
- Former name: Annales Musei Zoologici Polonici
- History: 1921–present
- Publisher: Museum and Institute of Zoology (Polish Academy of Sciences) (Poland)
- Frequency: Quarterly
- Impact factor: 1.136 (2015)

Standard abbreviations
- ISO 4: Ann. Zool.

Indexing
- CODEN: AZOGAR
- ISSN: 0003-4541 (print); 1734-1833 (web)
- LCCN: 97656619
- OCLC no.: 1443837

Links
- Journal homepage; Online access at IngentaConnect; Online access at BioOne

Annales Zoologici is a quarterly peer-reviewed scientific journal covering all aspects of systematic zoology. Established in 1951, it is published by the Museum and Institute of Zoology of the Polish Academy of Sciences.
