= Zoosystematica Rossica =

Academic journal

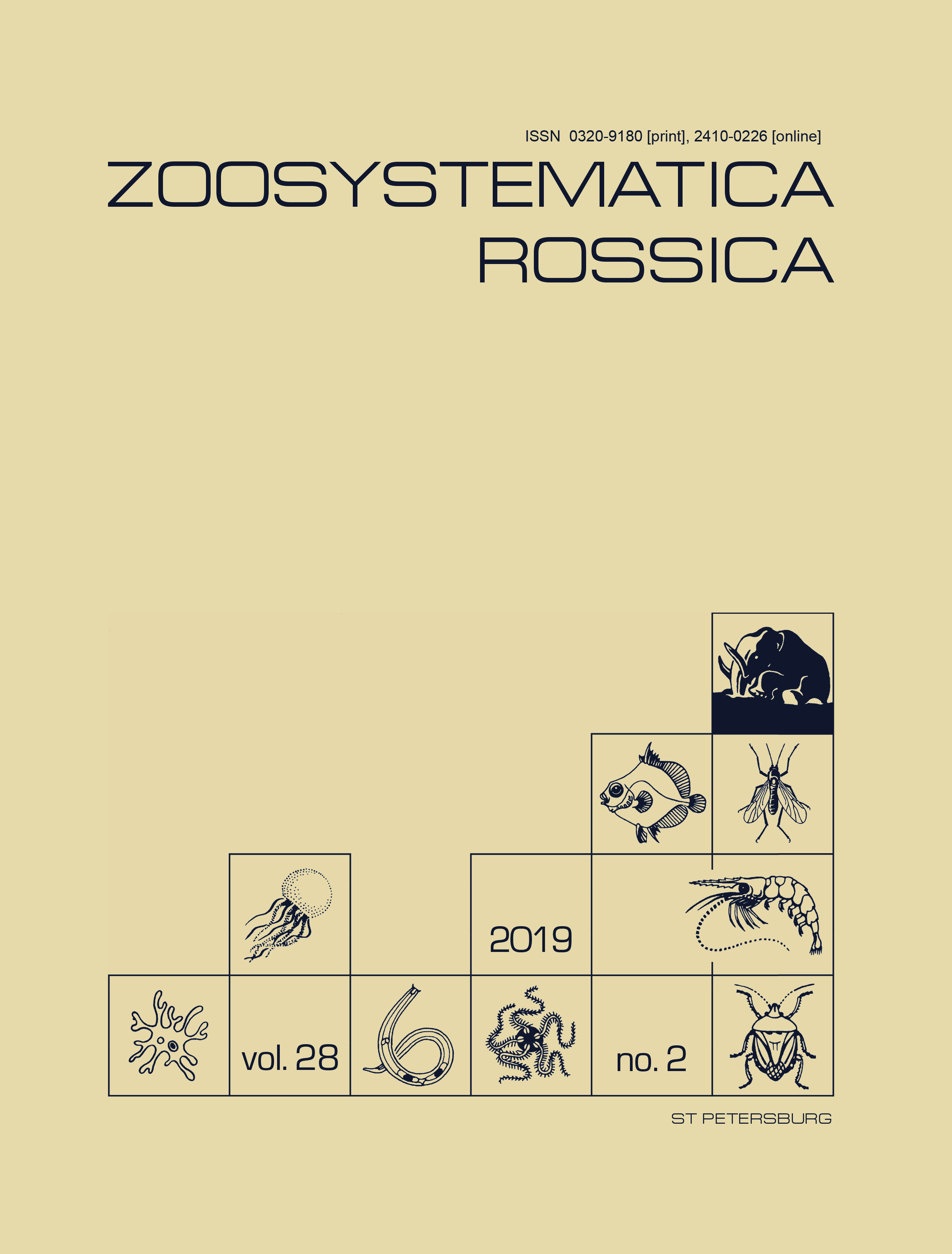
- Discipline: Taxonomy, Zoology Entomology
- Language: English
- Edited by: Dimitry Gapon

Publication details
- History: 1992–present
- Publisher: Zoological Institute of the Russian Academy of Sciences (Russia, St Petersburg)
- Frequency: continuous publication (CP) model; two printed issues per year
- Open access: Yes

Standard abbreviations
- ISO 4: Zoosyst. Ross.

Indexing
- ISSN: 0320-9180 (print); 2410-0226 (web)

Links
- Journal homepage

Zoosystematica Rossica is a peer-reviewed open access scientific journal covering any aspects of systematic zoology. The journal is published in English and focuses on the descriptions of new taxa, revisions and reviews, nomenclature, theories and methods of taxonomy and phylogeny, interesting new faunal records, catalogues and checklists, identification keys, phylogenetic relationships and zoogeography. It was established in 1992 and is published by the Zoological Institute of the Russian Academy of Sciences (St Petersburg).

== Abstracting, indexing and archiving ==
The journal is indexed by Biological Abstracts, BIOSIS Previews, Dimensions, EBSCO databases, Scopus, and The Zoological Record.

All papers are registered in the Official Register of Zoological Nomenclature (ZooBank) and archived at the Zenodo digital repository in order to comply with requirements of the International Code of Zoological Nomenclature.
