= Southwestern Entomologist =

- Discipline: Entomology
- Language: English
- Edited by: Carlos A. Blanco

Publication details
- History: 1976-present
- Publisher: Society of Southwestern Entomologists (United States)
- Frequency: Quarterly

Standard abbreviations
- ISO 4: Southwest. Entomol.

Indexing
- CODEN: SENTDD
- ISSN: 0147-1724
- LCCN: 91641628
- OCLC no.: 60627611

Links
- Journal homepage; Online tables of contents

The Southwestern Entomologist is a quarterly peer-reviewed scientific journal published by the Society of Southwestern Entomologists. It was established since 1976 and is a regional publication covering entomological research conducted primarily in Texas, Oklahoma, New Mexico, and Mexico. It is published in English ans Spanish.
