= Hawaiian Entomological Society =

The Hawaiian Entomological Society was formed in early 1900 and first convened on January 26, 1905 in the Board Room of the Bureau of Agriculture and Forestry in Honolulu, Hawaii. The original officers of the group included the prominent British entomologist, ornithologist, and naturalist Robert Cyril Layton Perkins (President), Alexander Craw (Vice President), Jacob Kotinsky (Secretary-Treasurer), Otto H. Swezey, (Executive Committee Member & Editor), D.L. Van Dine (Executive Committee), and G.W. Kirkaldy (Editor). The society publishes the Proceedings of the Hawaiian Entomological Society.

== Proceedings of the Hawaiian Entomological Society ==
Proceedings of the Hawaiian Entomological Society
- Discipline: Entomology
- Language: English

Publication details
- History: 1906-present
- Publisher: Hawaiian Entomological Society (United States)
- Frequency: annual

Standard abbreviations
- ISO 4: Proc. Hawaii. Entomol. Soc.

Indexing
- ISSN: 0073-134X

Links
- Journal homepage

The Proceedings from the Hawaiian Entomological Society is an academic journal published by the Hawaiian Entomological Society and stored in the ScholarSpace digital institutional repository of the University of Hawaii at Manoa library. The journal contains hundreds of manuscripts that describe entomological, or insect, research and observations in Hawaii and the Pacific. The first issue was published in 1906.
