= Journal of the Entomological Research Society =

- Discipline: Entomology
- Language: English
- Edited by: Abdullah Hasbenli

Publication details
- History: 1999–present
- Publisher: Gazi Entomological Research Society (Turkey)
- Frequency: Triannual
- Open access: YES
- Impact factor: 0.400 (2014)

Standard abbreviations
- ISO 4: J. Entomol. Res. Soc.

Indexing
- ISSN: 1302-0250

Links
- Journal homepage; Archives; Abstracts

The Journal of the Entomological Research Society is a peer-reviewed scientific journal published by the Gazi Entomological Research Society. It focus on several aspects of entomology, particularly those related to taxonomy, phylogeny, biodiversity, ecology, aquaculture and morphology.

== Indexing ==
The journal is indexed in:

- Biological Abstracts
- Zoological Record
- Entomology Abstracts
- CAB Abstracts
- Field Crop Abstracts
- Organic Research Database
- Wheat, Barley and Triticale Abstracts
- Review of Medical and Veterinary Entomology
- Veterinary Bulletin
- Review of Agricultural Entomology
- Forestry Abstracts
- Agroforestry Abstracts
- EBSCO Databases
- Science Citation Index Expanded
