= Proceedings of the Royal Entomological Society of London =

- Discipline: Entomology
- Language: English

Publication details
- History: 1926–1976
- Publisher: Royal Entomological Society

Standard abbreviations
- ISO 4: Proc. R. Entomol. Soc.

Indexing
- Proceedings of the Entomological Society of London
- ISSN: 1472-0949 (print); 2056-8096 (web)
- Proceedings of the Royal Entomological Society of London
- ISSN: 1472-0981 (print); 2056-8088 (web)
- Proceedings of the Royal Entomological Society of London. Series A, General Entomology
- ISSN: 0375-0418 (print); 2056-5321 (web)
- Proceedings of the Royal Entomological Society of London. Series B, Taxonomy
- ISSN: 0375-0434 (print); 2056-5291 (web)
- Proceedings of the Royal Entomological Society of London. Series C, Journal of Meetings
- ISSN: 1946-1496 (print); 1946-150X (web)
- Proceedings of the Royal Entomological Society of London. Journal of Meetings
- ISSN: 0080-4355
- Stylops
- ISSN: 2634-0453

Proceedings of the Royal Entomological Society of London was a peer-reviewed scientific journal of entomology established in 1926 by the Royal Entomological Society. A history is presented below.

== History ==
Ever the years, the journal was split and renamed several times:

- Proceedings of the Entomological Society of London (1926–1932)
- Proceedings of the Royal Entomological Society of London (1933–1936)
  - Proceedings of the Royal Entomological Society of London, Series A, General Entomology (1936–1970)
    - Journal of Entomology, Series A (1971–1976)
  - Proceedings of the Royal Entomological Society of London, Series B, Taxonomy (1936–1970) [originally Stylops: A Journal of Taxonomic Entomology (1932–1935)]
    - Journal of Entomology, Series B (1971–1976)
  - Proceedings of the Royal Entomological Society of London, Series C, Journal of Meetings (1936–1971)
    - Proceedings of the Royal Entomological Society of London, Journal of Meetings (1972–1977)

After 1977, several journals continued the Proceedings, restarting volume numbering at 1.

- Ecological Entomology (1976–present)
- Physiological Entomology (1976–present)
- Systematic Entomology (1976–present)
