= Atheta parca =

Scientific classification
- Kingdom: Animalia
- Phylum: Arthropoda
- Class: Insecta
- Order: Coleoptera
- Suborder: Polyphaga
- Infraorder: Staphyliniformia
- Family: Staphylinidae
- Genus: Atheta
- Species: A. parca

Binomial name
- Atheta parca (Mulsant & Rey, 1873)

Species of beetle

Atheta parca is a species of beetle belonging to the family Staphylinidae.

Synonyms:

- Atheta (Parameotica) parca (Mulsant & Rey, 1873)
- Atheta (Philhygra) parca (Mulsant & Rey, 1873)
- Atheta nannion (Joy, 1931)
