= Hybrid open-access journal =

Journal publishing a mixture of open-access and subscription-based content

A hybrid open-access journal is a subscription journal in which some of the articles are open access. This status typically requires the payment of a publication fee (also called an article processing charge or APC) to the publisher in order to publish an article open access, in addition to the continued payment of subscriptions to access all other content. Strictly speaking, the term "hybrid open-access journal" is incorrect, possibly misleading, as using the same logic such journals could also be called "hybrid subscription journals". Simply using the term "hybrid access journal" is accurate.

Publishers that offer a hybrid open access option often use different names for it. The SHERPA/RoMEO site provides a list of publishers and the names of their options. The Open Access Directory provides a list of funds that support open access journals, and provides information about which funds will pay fees for hybrid open access journals.

== Origins ==
The concept was first proposed in 1998 when Thomas Walker suggested that authors could purchase extra visibility at a price. The first journal recognized as using this model was Walker's own Florida Entomologist; it was later extended to the other publications of the Entomological Society of America. The idea was later refined by David Prosser in 2003 in the journal Learned Publishing. The larger academic publishers began offering hybrid open access journals around the same time, with Springer and Wiley both having started by 2005. Within two years, Elsevier, Taylor & Francis and the Nature Publishing Group had followed suit.

== Gradual uptake of hybrid open access ==
The early uptake of hybrid open access was slow, and differed between countries. A study in 2012 noted that "The number of hybrid journals has doubled in the past couple of years and is now over 4,300, "but concluded that there was "lack of success of this business model", with only 1 to 2% of researchers making use of it. However, the United Kingdom was a notable front runner in using the model, "its use of OA in hybrid journals and of delayed OA journals is more than twice the world average". Growth slowly continued, and a 2018 large-scale survey of open access business models across global scholarly publishing estimated that between 3 and 8% of articles were published via hybrid open access. Research carried out a year later indicated that Hybrid Open Access had actually peaked around 2016.

== Criticism ==
While hybrid Open Access began as an agreed method amongst publishers, scientists and libraries for a gradual transition towards full Open Access, it soon attracted various criticisms for being unfair.

=== Allegations of double dipping ===
Since one source of funds to pay for open access articles is the library subscription budget, it has been proposed that there needs to be a decrease in the subscription cost to the library in order to avoid 'double dipping' where an article is paid for twice – once through subscription fees, and again through an APC. For example, the Open Access Authors Fund of the University of Calgary Library (2009/09) requires that: "To be eligible for funding in this [hybrid open access] category, the publisher must plan to make (in the next subscription year) reductions to the institutional subscription prices based on the number of open-access articles in those journals." On 12 November 2009, Nature Publishing Group issued a news release on how open access affected its subscription prices.

However, university libraries were unconvinced that the decrease in prices was occurring. A report on work carried out by the University of Nottingham since 2006 to introduce and manage an institutional open access fund has been published by Stephen Pinfield in Learned Publishing. In this article, the author comments that: "As publishers' income has increased from OA [open-access] fees in the hybrid model, there has been little or no let-up in journal subscription inflation, and only a small minority of publishers have yet committed to adjusting their subscription prices as they receive increasing levels of income from OA options." By 2018, this particular problem was considered so extreme in the area of open access book (as opposed to journal) publishing that the Anti Double Dipping Alliance was formed.

== Institutional responses ==
Towards the start of Hybrid Open Access, some universities, research centers, foundations, and government agencies designated funds to pay publication fees (APCs) of fee-based open access journals, including hybrid. However, as criticism of hybrid has grown, a substantial number of such funds (40%) will not reimburse APCs in hybrid journals, including Harvard University, CERN, Deutsche Forschungsgemeinschaft, Columbia University and the Norwegian Research Council. The European Commission has also announced that the ninth framework program (Horizon Europe) will not cover the cost of APCs in hybrid journals. Science Europe has set up a coalition of European research funders (cOAlition S) who have explicitly ruled out reimbursing APCs in hybrid journals from 2020 with the express aim of driving a more rapid transition towards full open access (see transformative journal).

Publishers have argued against the above criticisms and responses, arguing that hybrid "as successfully meet[s] market demands and foster[s] growth in open access publishing."

== Advantages and disadvantages to the author ==
An author who wants to publish in an open-access format is not limited to the relatively small number of "full" open-access journals, but can also choose from the available hybrid open-access journals, which include journals published by many of the largest academic publishers.

However, the author must still find the money. Many funding agencies are ready to let authors use grant funds, or apply for supplementary funds, to pay publication fees at open-access journals. (Only a minority of open-access journals charge such fees, but nearly all hybrid open access journals do so.) So far, the funding agencies that are willing to pay these fees do not distinguish between full and hybrid open-access journals. On 19 October 2009, one such funding agency, the Wellcome Trust, expressed concerns about hybrid open-access fees being paid twice, through subscriptions and through publication fees.

If an author is unable to pay the fees or chooses not to do so, they often retain the right to share their work online by self-archiving in an open access repository.

== Variations ==
The American Society of Plant Biologists has adopted a policy that articles contributed by society members to its journal, Plant Physiology, will be made open access immediately on publication at no additional charge. Non-member authors can receive OA through payment of $1,000, but since membership is only $115/year, it is expected this initiative will boost membership.

Partial open access exists when only research articles are open (as in BMJ), while articles in other categories are paywalled.

== See also ==
- List of open-access journals
- Scientific journal
