= Osmia (journal) =

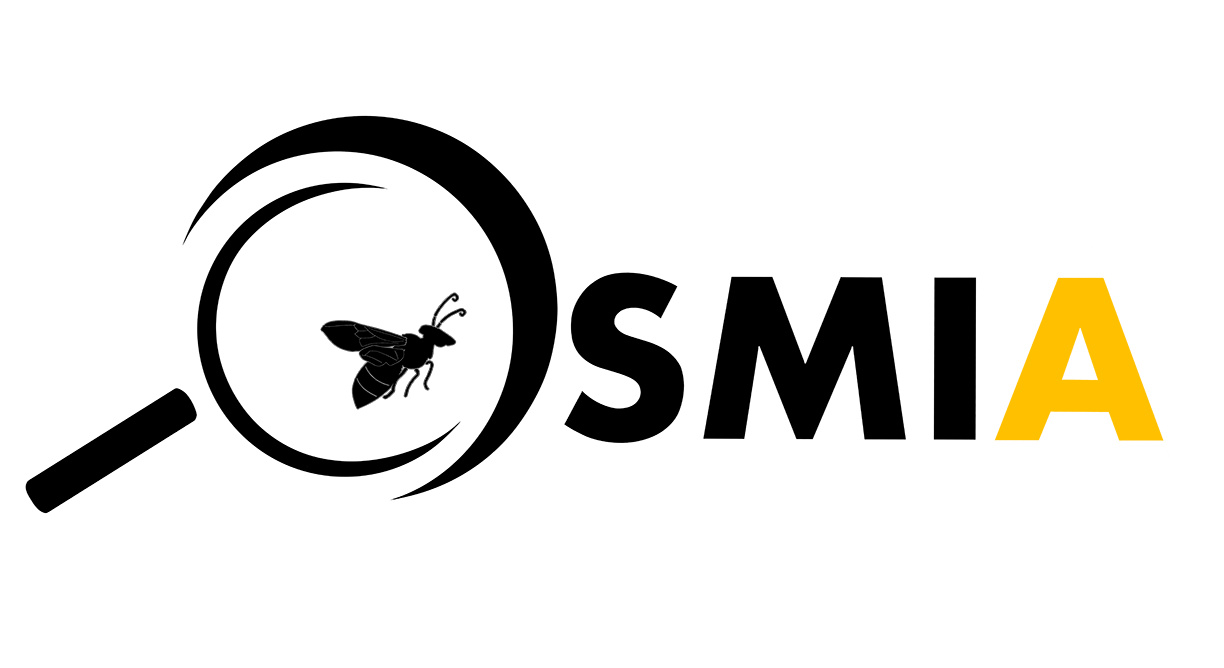
Osmia logo

Osmia (ISSN 2727-3806) is a scientific journal published in English and French about Hymenoptera research, launched in 2007. It is published by the Observatoire des Abeilles [Observatory of Bees], a French and Belgian society about knowledge and protection of wild bees. The items are peer-reviewed and available online, in open access, under a free licence CC BY 4.0.

== History ==
The first volume is published in 2007 with Nicolas Vereecken (today professor at Université Libre de Bruxelles) as first editor-in-chief who manages the journal until 2012. Osmia originally publishes items about Apoidea (bees and spheciforms). One issue is published each year, except in 2011. The journal knows an interruption and, in 2016, a new team led by Benoît Geslin (senior lecturer at Université Aix-Marseille) takes care of the journal . An issue is published each two years (2016, 2018) before taking an annual rhythm from 2020. In 2020, a publication "by item" is adopted and the current website is produced, as well as new indexing tools, giving a better audience to the journal. In 2021, the team takes a decision: to enlarge the scope to all Hymenoptera.

== Availability ==
The website of the first editor-in-chief initially hosts the journal. Then the journal is hosted by the publishing society, the Observatoire des Abeilles, on its website. In 2020, a dedicated website is made. All the charges are paid by the society; this allows the journal to be free for the authors as well as the readers.

== Validity of taxa descriptions ==
The journal scrupulously follows the rules and recommendations of the International Commission on Zoological Nomenclature. The descriptions of taxa are then perfectly valid.

== Indexing and archiving ==
The journal is indexed or archived by Crossref, Zoobank , HAL, Zenodo, OpenAIRE, Google Scholar and Web of Science (Clarivate) [Zoological Record].
