= Fragmenta Entomologica =

- Discipline: Entomology
- Language: English
- Edited by: Paolo Audisio

Publication details
- History: 1951–present
- Publisher: Sapienza University of Rome (Italy)
- Frequency: Semi-annual
- Open access: Yes
- License: Creative Commons Attribution-NonCommercial 4.0

Standard abbreviations
- ISO 4: Fragm. Entomol.

Indexing
- ISSN: 0429-288X (print); 2284-4880 (web)
- OCLC no.: 1569945

Links
- Journal homepage

Fragmenta Entomologica is a peer-reviewed open access scholarly journal publishing entomological research. It is published by Sapienza University of Rome now with the online support of Riviste Online SApienza (R.O.SA) instead of PAGEPress, Paolo Audisio serves as the current editor-in-chief.

Fragmenta Entomologica focuses on high-quality papers dealing with Arthropod biodiversity. The journal publishes research articles, short scientific notes, reviews, comments, and editorials. Its core scope encompasses Taxonomy, Systematics, Molecular phylogeny, Morphology, Paleontology, Biodiversity, Biogeography, Evolutionary biology, Conservation biology, Ecology, Ethology, and Applied Entomology. It covers all terrestrial, freshwater, and brackish water Arthropods.

The journal considers merely faunistic papers for publication if they present significant new data highlighting conservation priorities for rare, protected, or endangered arthropods and their habitats, deal with newly introduced pest species, or concern poorly known geographic areas from scarcely investigated countries.

== Peer review process ==
The journal adheres to the ICMJE Recommendations and the Principles of Transparency and Best Practice in Scholarly Publishing. Manuscripts undergo a thorough peer-review process by leading specialists, ensuring the maintenance of high scientific standards. The international advisory board, composed of renowned authorities, guarantees the scientific profile of the journal.

== Publication frequency ==
Fragmenta Entomologica publishes papers as soon as they are accepted, adding them to the "current" volume's Table of Contents, issuing one volume per year with biannual issues in June and December.

== Open access policy ==
The journal provides immediate open access to its content, supporting a greater global exchange of knowledge. There are no article processing fees charged to authors. The electronic version is freely available, with each paper uploaded in PDF format upon publication.

== Publication ethics ==
Fragmenta Entomologica commits to high ethical standards in publishing, supporting the COPE Code of Conduct, and adhering to international standards for editors and authors. It employs a rigorous peer-review process and takes a firm stance against plagiarism, endorsing the European Code of Conduct on Research Integrity.

== Archiving ==
The journal utilizes the PKP Preservation Network for distributed archiving, ensuring long-term preservation and restoration.

== Abstracting and indexing ==
The journal is abstracted and indexed in:

- Scopus
- Emerging Sources Citation Index
- Biological Abstracts
- BIOSIS Previews
- Zoological Record
