= Florida Entomologist =

Scientific journal

- Discipline: Entomology
- Language: English
- Edited by: James Nation

Publication details
- Former name: The Florida Buggist
- History: 1917–present
- Publisher: Florida Entomological Society
- Frequency: Quarterly
- Open access: Yes
- Impact factor: 1.1 (2023)

Standard abbreviations
- ISO 4: Fla. Entomol.

Indexing
- ISSN: 0015-4040 (print); 1938-5102 (web)
- Florida Buggist
- ISSN: 1930-4013 (print); 2163-632X (web)

Links
- Journal homepage; Online access; Online archive

The Florida Entomologist is a quarterly open access scientific journal published by the Florida Entomological Society. Founded in 1917 as The Florida Buggist, obtaining its current name in 1920. Manuscripts from all disciplines of entomology are accepted for consideration. The editor-in-chief is James Nation (University of Florida). According to the Journal Citation Reports, the journal has a 2023 impact factor of 1.1.

It is notable as the first journal to experiment with a hybrid open access business model.
