= American Entomological Society =

Scientific society formed in 1859

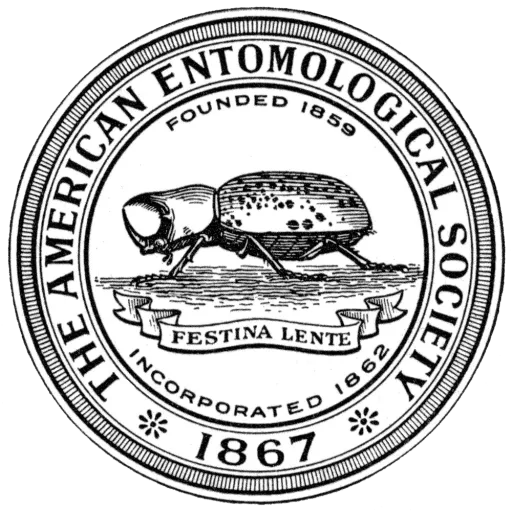
- Formation: March 1, 1859; 167 years ago
- Headquarters: Philadelphia, Pennsylvania
- Website: americanentomologicalsociety.org

The American Entomological Society was founded on March 1, 1859. It is the oldest continuously operating entomological society in the Western Hemisphere and one of the oldest scientific societies in the United States. Headquartered in Philadelphia, Pennsylvania, it publishes Entomological News, Transactions of the American Entomological Society and Memoirs of the American Entomological Society. It is not affiliated in any way with the similarly named Entomological Society of America.

Entomological News was originally known as Entomological News, and Proceedings of the Entomological Section of the Academy of Natural Sciences of Philadelphia, published by the Academy of Natural Sciences of Philadelphia, from 1890 to 1924.

== See also ==
- List of entomology journals
