= Pemberley Books =

English book retailer

Pemberley Natural History Books is an English book retailer, specialising in books on entomology, zoology, and natural history.

It was established in 1989 by Ian Johnson. They operate online and ship internationally, and also have a physical location in Iver, Buckinghamshire, England.

In addition to selling new and old books, they publish the journals Entomologist's Gazette and Entomologist's Monthly Magazine.
