= Entomologisk Tidskrift =

- Discipline: Entomology
- Language: English, Swedish
- Edited by: Michelle Nordkvist

Publication details
- History: 1880-present
- Publisher: Entomological Society of Sweden (Sweden)
- Frequency: Triannually

Standard abbreviations
- ISO 4: Entomol. Tidskr.

Indexing
- CODEN: ETTIAC
- ISSN: 0013-886X
- LCCN: sn83005314
- OCLC no.: 1030570

Links
- Journal homepage

The Entomologisk Tidskrift (English: Entomological Journal) is a peer-reviewed scientific journal published by the Entomological Society of Sweden (Swedish: Sveriges Entomologiska Förening) covering research on entomology, with an emphasis on Sweden and the other Nordic countries. It was established 1880 and is currently published triannually. The editor-in-chief is Michelle Nordkvist (Swedish University of Agricultural Sciences). The Entomologisk Tidskrift is abstracted and indexed in The Zoological Record and Entomology Abstracts.
