= Entomological Society of Japan =

Scientific society in Japan

The Entomological Society of Japan (Japanese: 日本昆虫学会) was founded in 1917 for the purpose of improving and promoting entomology in Japan. In 1995 the society merged with the Japanese Society of Applied Zoology and Entomology. As of 2024, the society has 958 total members.
