= Journal of Insect Science (Indian Society for the Advancement of Insect Science) =

Quarterly peer-reviewed scientific journal of entomology

- Discipline: Entomology
- Language: English
- Edited by: Balbir Singh Joia

Publication details
- History: 1987–present
- Publisher: Indian Society for the Advancement of Insect Science (India)
- Frequency: Quarterly

Standard abbreviations
- ISO 4: J. Insect Sci. (Ludhiana)

Indexing
- ISSN: 0970-3837 (print); 2250-2645 (web)
- OCLC no.: 24927000

Links
- Journal homepage

The Journal of Insect Science is a quarterly peer-reviewed scientific journal of entomology. It is published in Ludhiana by the Indian Society for the Advancement of Insect Science since 1988. The journal is edited by Balbir Singh Joia.

== Abstracting and indexing ==
The journal is abstracted and indexed in BIOSIS Previews and The Zoological Record.
