= Austral Entomology =

- Discipline: Entomology
- Language: English
- Edited by: A/Prof Martin J Steinbauer

Publication details
- Former name: Australian Journal of Entomology
- History: 1962–present
- Publisher: Wiley on behalf of the Australian Entomological Society
- Frequency: Quarterly
- Impact factor: 1.114 (2015)

Standard abbreviations
- ISO 4: Austral Entomol.

Indexing
- Austral Entomology
- ISSN: 2052-174X (print); 2052-1758 (web)
- Australian Journal of Entomology
- ISSN: 1326-6756 (print); 1440-6055 (web)

Links
- Journal homepage; Online access

Austral Entomology (formerly Australian Journal of Entomology) is a peer-reviewed scientific journal published by Wiley, on behalf of the Australian Entomological Society. The editor-in-chief is A/Prof Martin J Steinbauer.

Austral Entomology is the Society's flagship publication. It promotes the study of the biology, ecology, taxonomy and control of insects and arachnids in the southern hemisphere.
