= Entomological Society of Israel =

Scientific society in Israel

The Entomological Society of Israel
- Formation: 1962
- Type: national academy
- Headquarters: Beit Dagan, Israel
- Services: research, consultation, awards, scholarships
- Fields: Entomology
- President: Netta Dorchin
- Website: http://www.entomology.org.il

The Entomological Society of Israel (ISE) was founded on 20 February 1962 after more than 20 years of ad hoc meetings and discussions of various entomological issues. The founders included about 80 members, the most prominent of them being Yehezkel Rivnay, Chanan Bitinsky-Zaltz, Rachel Galun, Yitzhak Harpaz, Meir Pener and Shoshana Yatom. The Society is active in promoting various disciplines of arthropod research, ranging from alpha-taxonomy to molecular biology, organizing meetings and granting awards. Members of the Entomological Society of Israel meet annually at a Congress, where recent achievements in both basic and applied research are reported and discussed. In addition, during the year the Society organizes meetings on special topics. The office of the Society is located in Beit Dagan, Israel.

== Membership ==
Membership in the Entomological Society of Israel is granted to professional and amateur entomologists on recommendation by two members in good standing and after payment of a yearly membership fee.

== Publications ==
The Entomological Society of Israel publishes the Israel Journal of Entomology since 1966.
