= Insecta Mundi =

- Discipline: Entomology
- Language: English
- Edited by: David Plotkin

Publication details
- History: 1985–present
- Publisher: Center for Systematic Entomology
- Open access: Yes
- License: CC-by-NC

Standard abbreviations
- ISO 4: Insecta Mundi

Indexing
- CODEN: INMUEX
- ISSN: 0749-6737 (print); 1942-1354 (web)
- LCCN: 2007229151
- OCLC no.: 11166350

Links
- Journal homepage; Online access (Florida Online Journals); Online access (DigitalCommons@University of Nebraska–Lincoln)

Insecta Mundi: A Journal of World Insect Systematics is an open access peer-reviewed scientific journal of entomology, primarily devoted to insects, specifically "any non-marine arthropod". It is published by the Center for Systematic Entomology (CSE). The journal was established in 1985 by Ross Arnett and was published in print quarterly until 2007, when it switched to an immediately online upon acceptable publication model, with a paper and media edition produced once a year. At least one author of a manuscript must be a member of CSE for a manuscript to be considered.

== Indexing and abstracting ==
The journal is indexed and abstracted in the following bibliographic databases:

- CAB Abstracts
- DIALNET
- Zoological Record
- Veterinary Science Database
