= Entomologist's Monthly Magazine =

- Discipline: Entomology
- Language: English

Publication details
- History: 1864 to present
- Publisher: Pemberley Books (UK)

Standard abbreviations
- ISO 4: Entomol.'s Mon. Mag.

Indexing
- ISSN: 0013-8908

Links
- Journal homepage

Entomologist's Monthly Magazine is a British entomological journal, founded by a staff of five editors – T. Blackburn, H. G. Knaggs, M.D., R. McLachlan, F.L.S., E. C. Rye and H. T. Stainton – and first published in 1864. The journal publishes original papers and notes on all orders of insects and terrestrial arthropods from any part of the world, specialising in groups other than Lepidoptera. From 2023 onwards, Entomologist's Gazette was incorporated into Entomologist's Monthly Magazine, with the latter journal expanded in scope to include Lepidoptera.

Although its name would suggest otherwise, it is currently produced only four times per year by Pemberley Books as of 2007.
