= Eric William Classey =

English entomologist

Eric William Classey FRES (2 November 1916 – 6 September 2008) was an English entomologist specialising in Lepidoptera.

Eric Classey was a book dealer and entomological publisher and cofounder of The Entomologist’s Gazette. He was a Fellow of the Royal Entomological Society of London.
