= Entomologist's Gazette =

- Discipline: Entomology
- Language: English

Publication details
- History: 1950–2023
- Publisher: Pemberley Books (UK)
- Frequency: Quarterly

Standard abbreviations
- ISO 4: Entomol.'s Gaz.

Indexing
- ISSN: 0013-8894

Links
- Journal homepage

The Entomologist's Gazette was a British entomological journal. It contained articles and notes on the biology, ecology, distribution, taxonomy and systematics of all orders of insects, but with a bias towards Lepidoptera. It was produced quarterly and was first published in 1950. Although originally restricted to the entomological fauna of Great Britain and Ireland, in the 1970s it extended its scope to cover the Palearctic region as a whole. Originally published by E. W. Classey 1950–1990; Gem Publishing 1991–2006; since 2007 published by Pemberley Books.

From 2023 onwards, Entomologist's Gazette was incorporated into the Entomologist's Monthly Magazine, with the latter journal expanded in scope to include Lepidoptera.
