= List of Asilidae species: M =

This article lists described species of the family Asilidae start with letter M.

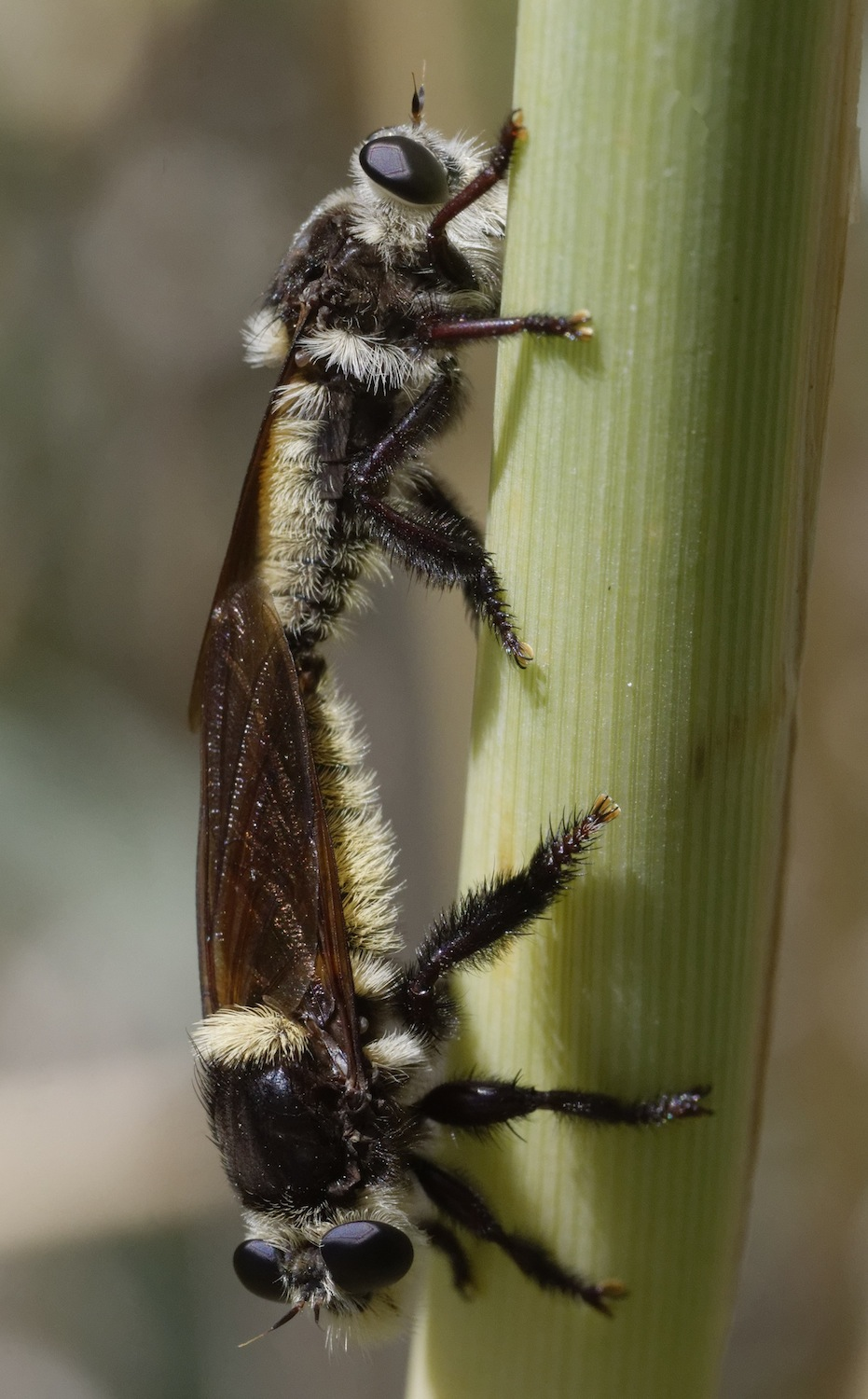
A mating pair of Mallophora fautrix

A • B • C • D • E • F • G • H • I • J • K • L • M • N • O • P • Q • R • S • T • U • V • W • Y • Z

== List of species ==
=== Genus Macahyba ===
- Macahyba nordestina (Carrera, 1947)

=== Genus Machimus ===
- Machimus achterbergi (Tomasovic, 2004)
- Machimus acutus (Martin, 1975)
- Machimus adustus (Martin, 1975)
- Machimus agilis (Wiedemann, 1828)
- Machimus alatavicus (Lehr, 1967)
- Machimus alterus (Williston, 1901)
- Machimus angularis (Ricardo, 1922)
- Machimus aradensis (Theodor, 1980)
- Machimus araxanus (Richter, 1963)
- Machimus aridus (Lehr, 1999)
- Machimus armeniacus (Richter, 1963)
- Machimus armipes (Becker, 1913)
- Machimus arthriticus (Zeller, 1840)
- Machimus asiaticus (Becker, 1925)
- Machimus asiaticus (Lehr, 1999)
- Machimus assamensis (Ricardo, 1919)
- Machimus aurimystax (Bromley, 1928)
- Machimus aurulentus (Becker, 1925)
- Machimus autumnalis (Banks, 1914)
- Machimus ayubiensis (Rahim, 1976)
- Machimus bataviensis (Meijere, 1914)
- Machimus bengalensis (Joseph & Parui, 1986)
- Machimus bicolor (Joseph & Parui, 1984)
- Machimus biljici (Adamovic, 1959)
- Machimus blascoi (Weinberg & Bächli, 2001)
- Machimus brevis (Martin, 1975)
- Machimus bromleyanus (Carrera & Andretta, 1950)
- Machimus calicutensis (Joseph & Parui, 1986)
- Machimus cancerae (Martin, 1975)
- Machimus caudiculatus (Speiser, 1910)
- Machimus cavagnaroi (Joseph & Parui, 1995)
- Machimus cerasinus (Martin, 1975)
- Machimus chaldaeus (Janssens, 1961)
- Machimus cheriani (Joseph & Parui, 1986)
- Machimus chinensis (Ricardo, 1919)
- Machimus cinchonaensis (Joseph & Parui, 1986)
- Machimus cinerarius (Pallas, 1818)
- Machimus coerulescens (Ricardo, 1919)
- Machimus coleus (Martin, 1975)
- Machimus coruscus (Wulp, 1898)
- Machimus cowini (Hobby, 1946)
- Machimus cyanopus (Loew, 1849)
- Machimus debilis (Becker, 1923)
- Machimus decipiens (Theodor, 1980)
- Machimus divinosus (Oldroyd, 1972)
- Machimus divisus (Becker, 1923)
- Machimus dravidicus (Joseph & Parui, 1986)
- Machimus dubiosus (Becker, 1923)
- Machimus dubius (Ricardo, 1919)
- Machimus elegans (Loew, 1849)
- Machimus erevanensis (Richter, 1963)
- Machimus ermineus (Becker, 1907)
- Machimus floridensis (Bromley, 1940)
- Machimus funebris (Theodor, 1980)
- Machimus gertschi (Bromley, 1951)
- Machimus gonatistes (Zeller, 1840)
- Machimus grantae (Martin, 1975)
- Machimus gratiosus (Loew, 1871)
- Machimus griseus (Hine, 1906)
- Machimus guttatus (Martin, 1975)
- Machimus gymnus (Oldroyd, 1939)
- Machimus hierosolymae (Theodor, 1980)
- Machimus hirsutus (Ricardo, 1922)
- Machimus hirtipes (Ricardo, 1919)
- Machimus ibizensis (Gil & Collado, 1932)
- Machimus impeditus (Becker, 1925)
- Machimus incisuralis (Bromley, 1935)
- Machimus indianus (Ricardo, 1919)
- Machimus indicus (Joseph & Parui, 1986)
- Machimus infrafemoralis (Bromley, 1935)
- Machimus intricans (Becker, 1923)
- Machimus inutilis (Bromley, 1935)
- Machimus javieri (Weinberg & Bächli, 2001)
- Machimus juxta (Oldroyd, 1939)
- Machimus keniaensis (Lindner, 1961)
- Machimus keralaensis (Joseph & Parui, 1986)
- Machimus khasiensis (Ricardo, 1919)
- Machimus krueperi (Becker, 1923)
- Machimus laevis (Becker, 1923)
- Machimus largus (Richter, 1963)
- Machimus latipex (Martin, 1975)
- Machimus lepturus (Gerstaecker, 1871)
- Machimus leucocephalus (Janssens, 1968)
- Machimus linearis (Becker, 1923)
- Machimus longipenis (Martin, 1975)
- Machimus longipennis (Lehr, 1999)
- Machimus lucentinus (Strobl, 1909)
- Machimus macophthalmus (Loew, 1871)
- Machimus madeirensis (Schiner, 1868)
- Machimus margaretae (Weinberg & Tsacas, 1975)
- Machimus martini (Tomasovic, 2003)
- Machimus mcalpinei (Martin, 1975)
- Machimus meridionalis (Efflatoun, 1934)
- Machimus modestus (Loew, 1849)
- Machimus mondali (Joseph & Parui, 1995)
- Machimus montanus (Ricardo, 1919)
- Machimus monticola (Frey, 1940)
- Machimus mussooriensis (Joseph & Parui, 1986)
- Machimus mystacinus (Becker, 1923)
- Machimus nahalalensis (Theodor, 1980)
- Machimus negevensis (Theodor, 1980)
- Machimus nevadensis (Strobl, 1909)
- Machimus nicobarensis (Schiner, 1868)
- Machimus nigrinus (Ricardo, 1919)
- Machimus nigripes (Ricardo, 1922)
- Machimus nigrosetosus (Séguy, 1941)
- Machimus nilgiriensis (Parui & Joseph, 1994)
- Machimus niveibarbus (Bellardi, 1861)
- Machimus notialis (Martin, 1975)
- Machimus oriens (Martin, 1975)
- Machimus painteri (Martin, 1975)
- Machimus pammelas (Speiser, 1910)
- Machimus parvus (Ricardo, 1919)
- Machimus perniciosus (Becker, 1923)
- Machimus perplexus (Becker, 1915)
- Machimus polyphemi (Bullington & Beck, 1991)
- Machimus portosanctanus (Cockerell, 1921)
- Machimus pseudogonatistes (Villeneuve, 1930)
- Machimus pseudonicobarensis (Joseph & Parui, 1987)
- Machimus punjabensis (Bromley, 1935)
- Machimus pyrenaicus (Becker, 1923)
- Machimus ricardoi (Bromley, 1935)
- Machimus rudis (Becker, 1923)
- Machimus rufipes (Ricardo, 1922)
- Machimus sagittarius (Villeneuve, 1930)
- Machimus sanctimontis (Janssens, 1960)
- Machimus sareptanus (Becker, 1923)
- Machimus scarbroughi (Joseph & Parui, 1986)
- Machimus schuezi (Lindner, 1961)
- Machimus sestertius (Martin, 1975)
- Machimus setiventris (Engel, 1930)
- Machimus smithi (Joseph & Parui, 1986)
- Machimus soikai (Janssens, 1961)
- Machimus stanfordae (Martin, 1975)
- Machimus subgenitalis (Bromley, 1935)
- Machimus submaculus (Martin, 1975)
- Machimus tenebrosus (Williston, 1901)
- Machimus tephraeus (Wiedemann, 1820)
- Machimus thoracius (Loew, 1849)
- Machimus tibialis (Ricardo, 1919)
- Machimus truncatus (Oldroyd, 1972)
- Machimus tugajorum (Lehr, 1964)
- Machimus ugandiensis (Ricardo, 1919)
- Machimus ventralis (Martin, 1975)
- Machimus virginicus (Banks, 1920)

=== Genus Machiremisca ===
- Machiremisca costalis (Theodor, 1980)
- Machiremisca verticillatus (Becker, 1907)

=== Genus Macrocolus ===
- Macrocolus barrettoi (Carrera, 1949)
- Macrocolus bicolor (Engel, 1930)
- Macrocolus martinorum (Artigas & Papavero, 1988)
- Macrocolus rubripes (Carrera & Papavero, 1962)

=== Genus Macroetra ===
- Macroetra angola (Londt, 1994)
- Macroetra cera (Londt, 1994)
- Macroetra damara (Londt, 1994)

=== Genus Mactea ===
- Mactea avocettina (Richter & Mamaev, 1976)
- Mactea chinensis (Hradský & Geller-Grimm, 2003)
- Mactea matsumurai (Hradský & Geller-Grimm, 2003)

=== Genus Maira ===
- Maira abscissa (Walker, 1860)
- Maira albifacies (Wulp, 1872)
- Maira appendiculata (Bezzi, 1928)
- Maira aterrima (Harmann, 1914)
- Maira aurifacies (Macquart, 1848)
- Maira bicolor (Joseph & Parui, 1987)
- Maira calopogon (Bigot, 1878)
- Maira cambodgiensis (Bigot, 1878)
- Maira claripennis (Le Gouillou, 1842)
- Maira compta (Walker, 1861)
- Maira conveniens (Walker, 1861)
- Maira definadoi (Joseph & Parui, 1981)
- Maira elegans (Walker, 1855)
- Maira elysiaca (Osten-Sacken, 1881)
- Maira flagellata (Walker, 1861)
- Maira germana (Walker, 1858)
- Maira gracilicornis (Meijere, 1913)
- Maira hirta (Meijere, 1913)
- Maira hispidella (Wulp, 1872)
- Maira indiana (Joseph & Parui, 1987)
- Maira kollari (Doleschall, 1857)
- Maira lauta (Wulp, 1885)
- Maira leei (Paramonov, 1958)
- Maira limbidorsum (Bezzi, 1928)
- Maira longicornis (Meijere, 1913)
- Maira longirostrata (Bromley, 1935)
- Maira nigrithorax (Wulp, 1872)
- Maira niveifacies (Macquart, 1850)
- Maira nychthemera (Wulp, 1872)
- Maira occulta (Wulp, 1872)
- Maira paradisiaca (Walker, 1859)
- Maira paria (Bigot, 1878)
- Maira pseudoindiana (Joseph & Parui, 1995)
- Maira setipes (Walker, 1861)
- Maira smaragdina (Bigot, 1878)
- Maira superba (Meijere, 1913)
- Maira tincta (Meijere, 1913)
- Maira tomentosa (Wulp, 1872)
- Maira tuberculata (Wulp, 1872)
- Maira vanderwulpi (Meijere, 1913)
- Maira varians (Ricardo, 1929)
- Maira villipes (Doleschall, 1857)
- Maira whitneyi (Curran, 1936)
- Maira willistoni (Curran, 1936)
- Maira wollastoni (Austen, 1915)
- Maira xizangensis (Shi, 1995)

=== Genus Mallophora ===
- Mallophora annuliventris (Artigas & Angulo, 1980)
- Mallophora antiqua (Walker, 1855)
- Mallophora ardens (Macquart, 1934)
- Mallophora argentipes (Macquart, 1838)
- Mallophora bassleri (Curran, 1941)
- Mallophora candens (Walker, 1851)
- Mallophora cingulata (Artigas & Angulo, 1980)
- Mallophora circumflava (Artigas & Angulo, 1980)
- Mallophora clavipes (Curran, 1941)
- Mallophora cortesi (Artigas & Angulo, 1980)
- Mallophora crocuscopa (Artigas & Angulo, 1980)
- Mallophora dureti (Artigas & Angulo, 1980)
- Mallophora emiliae (Carrera, 1960)
- Mallophora fritzi (Artigas & Angulo, 1980)
- Mallophora gracipes (Artigas & Angulo, 1980)
- Mallophora hemivitrea (Artigas & Angulo, 1980)
- Mallophora inca (Curran, 1941)
- Mallophora incanipes (Artigas & Angulo, 1980)
- Mallophora leucopyga (Artigas & Angulo, 1980)
- Mallophora lugubris (Lynch & Arribálzaga, 1880)
- Mallophora media (Clements, 1969)
- Mallophora papaveroi (Artigas & Angulo, 1980)
- Mallophora parasylveirii (Artigas & Angulo, 1980)
- Mallophora pusilla (Macquart, 1838)
- Mallophora ruficauda (Weidemann, 1828)
- Mallophora scopipeda (Rondani, 1863)
- Mallophora scopitarsis (Rondani, 1863)
- Mallophora singularis (Macquart, 1838)
- Mallophora tertiavitrea (Artigas & Angulo, 1980)
- Mallophora thompsoni (Artigas & Angulo, 1980)
- Mallophora tsacasi (Artigas & Angulo, 1980)
- Mallophora wilhelmi (Artigas & Angulo, 1980)

=== Genus Mauropteron ===
- Mauropteron farinum (Daniels, 1987)
- Mauropteron pelago (Walker, 1849)

=== Genus Megalometopon ===
- Megalometopon immisericorde (Artigas, 1970)

=== Genus Megaphorus ===
- Megaphorus brunneus (Cole, 1964)
- Megaphorus durangoensis (Cole, 1964)
- Megaphorus flavidus (Cole, 1964)
- Megaphorus frustrus (Pritchard, 1935)
- Megaphorus lascruensis (Cole, 1964)
- Megaphorus martinorum (Cole, 1964)
- Megaphorus minutus (Macquart, 1834)
- Megaphorus prudens (Pritchard, 1935)
- Megaphorus willistoni (Cole, 1964)

=== Genus Meliponomima ===
- Meliponomima martensis (Artigas & Papavero, 1989)

=== Genus Melouromyia ===
- Melouromyia diaphorus (Londt, 2002)

=== Genus Mercuriana ===
- Mercuriana stackelbergi (Lehr, 1988)

=== Genus Merodontina ===
- Merodontina abligueodentia Shi, 1992
- Merodontina bellicosa Scarbrough & Constantino, 2005
- Merodontina indiana Joseph & Parui, 1984
- Merodontina insula Scarbrough & Hill, 2000
- Merodontina jianfenglingensis Hua, 1987
- Merodontina nigripes Shi, 1991
- Merodontina obliquata Shi, 1991
- Merodontina rectidensa Shi, 1991
- Merodontina robusta Rao & Parui, 1994
- Merodontina rufirostra Shi, 1991
- Merodontina sikkimensis Enderlein, 1914
- Merodontina silvatica Haupt & Azuma, 1998
- Merodontina spinulosa Joseph & Parui, 1997
- Merodontina thaiensis Scarbrough & Hill, 2000

=== Genus Mesoleptogaster ===
- Mesoleptogaster bicoloripes (Hsia, 1949)
- Mesoleptogaster convergens (Frey, 1937)
- Mesoleptogaster eoa (Lehr, 1961)
- Mesoleptogaster fulvicrus (Hsia, 1949)
- Mesoleptogaster fuscatipennis (Frey, 1937)
- Mesoleptogaster gracilipes (Hsia, 1949)
- Mesoleptogaster levusara (Evenhuis, 2006)
- Mesoleptogaster loaloa (Evenhuis, 2006)
- Mesoleptogaster meriel (Evenhuis, 2006)
- Mesoleptogaster trimaculata (Meijere, 1914)
- Mesoleptogaster vitiensis (Evenhuis, 2006)

=== Genus Metadioctria ===
- Metadioctria resplendens (Loew, 1872)

=== Genus Metalaphria ===
- Metalaphria australis (Ricardo, 1912)

=== Genus Metapogon ===
- Metapogon albulus (Melander, 1924)
- Metapogon amargosae (Wilcox, 1972)
- Metapogon carinatus (Wilcox, 1964)
- Metapogon gilvipes (Coquillett, 1904)
- Metapogon holbrooki (Wilcox, 1964)
- Metapogon hurdi (Wilcox, 1964)
- Metapogon leechi (Wilcox, 1964)
- Metapogon obispae (Wilcox, 1972)
- Metapogon punctipennis (Coquillett, 1904)
- Metapogon tarsalus (Wilcox, 1964)
- Metapogon tricellus (Wilcox, 1964)

=== Genus Michotamia ===
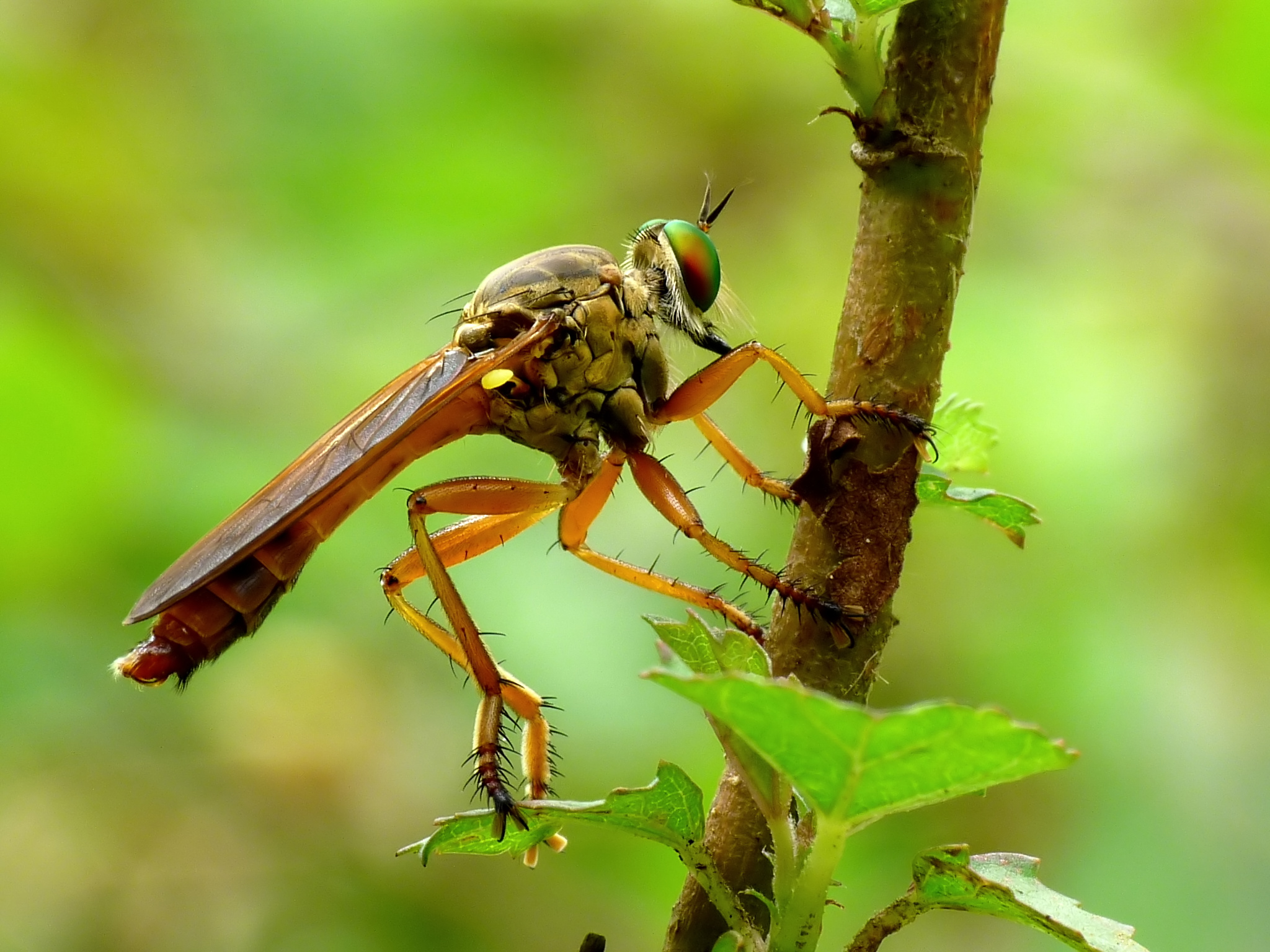
Michotamia aurata male

- Michotamia analis Macquart, 1838
- Michotamia annulata Bigot, 1878
- Michotamia assamensis Joseph & Parui, 1995
- Michotamia aurata (Fabricius, 1794)
- Michotamia coarctata (Macquart, 1855)
- Michotamia compedita (Wiedemann, 1828)
- Michotamia cothurnata (Bigot, 1875)
- Michotamia decepta Scarbrough & Hill, 2000
- Michotamia demeijerei Oldroyd, 1975
- Michotamia fuscifemorata Joseph & Parui, 1984
- Michotamia indiana Joseph & Parui, 1981
- Michotamia latifascia (Walker, 1857)
- Michotamia macquarti Joseph & Parui, 1984
- Michotamia minor (Meijere, 1911)
- Michotamia nigra (Meijere, 1911)
- Michotamia nigra Scarbrough & Hill, 2000 (Homonym)
- Michotamia praeacuta (Wulp, 1898)
- Michotamia pruthii Joseph & Parui, 1987
- Michotamia scitula (Walker, 1859)
- Michotamia setitarsata Schiner, 1867
- Michotamia siamensis Tomosovic & Grootaert, 2003
- Michotamia singaporensis Tomosovic & Grootaert, 2008
- Michotamia triangulum (Wulp, 1872)
- Michotamia vulpina (Bigot, 1875)

=== Genus Microphontes ===
- Microphontes megoura (Londt, 1994)
- Microphontes safra (Londt, 1994)
- Microphontes whittingtoni (Londt, 1994)

=== Genus Microstylum ===
- Microstylum albimystaceum (Macquart, 1855)
- Microstylum amoyense (Bigot, 1878)
- Microstylum ananthakrishnani (Joseph & Parui, 1985)
- Microstylum apicale (Wiedemann, 1821)
- Microstylum apiforme (Walker, 1851)
- Microstylum appendiculatum (Macquart, 1847)
- Microstylum atrorubens (Timon-David, 1952)
- Microstylum balbillus (Walker, 1849)
- Microstylum barbarossa (Wiedemann, 1828)
- Microstylum basalis (Brunetti, 1928)
- Microstylum basirufum (Bigot, 1878)
- Microstylum bhattacharyai (Joseph & Parui, 1985)
- Microstylum bicolor (Macquart, 1849)
- Microstylum biggsi (Oldroyd, 1960)
- Microstylum bloesum (Walker, 1849)
- Microstylum braunsi (Engel, 1932)
- Microstylum brevipennatum (Bigot, 1878)
- Microstylum bromleyi (Timon-David, 1952)
- Microstylum capucinum (Bigot, 1879)
- Microstylum catastygnum (Papavero, 1971)
- Microstylum cilipes (Macquart, 1838)
- Microstylum cinctum (Bromley, 1931)
- Microstylum coimbatorensis (Joseph & Parui, 1987)
- Microstylum decretus (Walker, 1860)
- Microstylum difficile (Wiedemann, 1828)
- Microstylum dimorphum (Matsumura, 1916)
- Microstylum dispar (Loew, 1858)
- Microstylum elongatum (Bigot, 1879)
- Microstylum erythropygum (Bigot, 1878)
- Microstylum eximium (Bigot, 1878)
- Microstylum fafner (Enderlein, 1914)
- Microstylum fenestratum (Wiedemann, 1828)
- Microstylum flavipenne (Macquart, 1846)
- Microstylum flaviventre (Macquart, 1850)
- Microstylum fulvicaudatum (Bigot, 1879)
- Microstylum fulvigaster (Bigot, 1878)
- Microstylum fulviventre (Wulp, 1898)
- Microstylum galactodes (Loew, 1866)
- Microstylum gigas (Wiedemann, 1821)
- Microstylum gladiator (Bromley, 1927)
- Microstylum griseum (Bromley, 1927)
- Microstylum haemorrhoidale (Bigot, 1878)
- Microstylum helenae (Bezzi, 1914)
- Microstylum hirtipes (Ricardo, 1925)
- Microstylum hobbyi (Bromley, 1947)
- Microstylum imbutum (Walker, 1851)
- Microstylum incomptum (Walker, 1857)
- Microstylum indutum (Rondani, 1875)
- Microstylum insigne (Bromley, 1927)
- Microstylum lambertoni (Bromley, 1931)
- Microstylum leucacanthum (Bezzi, 1908)
- Microstylum libo (Walker, 1849)
- Microstylum lucifer (Bromley, 1930)
- Microstylum luciferoides (Bromley, 1942)
- Microstylum maculiventris (Bezzi, 1908)
- Microstylum magnum (Bromley, 1927)
- Microstylum marudamamaiensis (Joseph & Parui, 1987)
- Microstylum melanomystax (Enderlein, 1914)
- Microstylum miles (Karsch, 1879)
- Microstylum mydas (Engel, 1932)
- Microstylum nigrescens (Ricardo, 1900)
- Microstylum nigribarbatum (Bigot, 1879)
- Microstylum nigricauda (Wiedemann, 1824)
- Microstylum nigrimystaceum (Ricardo, 1925)
- Microstylum nigrisetosum (Efflatoun, 1937)
- Microstylum nigritarse (Bromley, 1927)
- Microstylum nigrostriatum (Hobby, 1933)
- Microstylum nigrum (Bigot, 1859)
- Microstylum nitidiventre (Bigot, 1878)
- Microstylum oberthuerii (Wulp, 1896)
- Microstylum otacilius (Walker, 1849)
- Microstylum partitum (Walker, 1856)
- Microstylum pauliani (Timon-David, 1952)
- Microstylum pedunculata (Bezzi, 1908)
- Microstylum pollex (Oldroyd, 1970)
- Microstylum polygnotus (Walker, 1849)
- Microstylum proclive (Walker, 1860)
- Microstylum proximum (Oldroyd, 1960)
- Microstylum pseudoananthakrishnani (Joseph & Parui, 1989)
- Microstylum rabodae (Karsch, 1884)
- Microstylum remicorne (Loew, 1863)
- Microstylum rhypae (Walker, 1849)
- Microstylum ricardoae (Oldroyd, 1970)
- Microstylum rubigenis (Bromley, 1927)
- Microstylum rubripes (Macquart, 1838)
- Microstylum rufinale (Macquart, 1850)
- Microstylum rufinevrum (Macquart, 1855)
- Microstylum rufoabdominalis (Brunetti, 1928)
- Microstylum rufum (Ricardo, 1925)
- Microstylum sagitta (Bigot, 1879)
- Microstylum saverrio (Walker, 1849)
- Microstylum scython (Walker, 1849)
- Microstylum seguyi (Timon-David, 1952)
- Microstylum sessile (Bezzi, 1908)
- Microstylum simplicissimum (Loew, 1852)
- Microstylum sordidum (Walker, 1854)
- Microstylum spectrum (Wiedemann, 1828)
- Microstylum spinipes (Ricardo, 1925)
- Microstylum spurinum (Walker, 1849)
- Microstylum strigatum (Enderlein, 1914)
- Microstylum sumatranum (Enderlein, 1914)
- Microstylum sura (Walker, 1849)
- Microstylum taeniatum (Wiedemann, 1828)
- Microstylum tananarivense (Bromley, 1931)
- Microstylum testaceum (Macquart, 1846)
- Microstylum trimelas (Walker, 1851)
- Microstylum umbrosum (Bromley, 1931)
- Microstylum unicolor (Ricardo, 1925)
- Microstylum ustulatum (Engel & Cuthbertson, 1938)
- Microstylum validum (Loew, 1858)
- Microstylum varipennatum (Bigot, 1879)
- Microstylum varshneyi (Joseph & Parui, 1985)
- Microstylum venosum (Wiedemann, 1821)
- Microstylum vestitum (Rondani, 1875)
- Microstylum villosum (Bigot, 1879)
- Microstylum vulcan (Bromley, 1928)
- Microstylum whitei (Brunetti, 1928)

=== Genus Millenarius ===
- Millenarius graminosus (Londt, 2005)

=== Genus Minicatus ===
- Minicatus mirabilis (Lehr, 1967)

=== Genus Molobratia ===
- Molobratia arkadii (Lehr, 2002)
- Molobratia bokhai (Lehr, 2002)
- Molobratia chujoi (Nagatomi & Imaizumi, 1989)
- Molobratia kanoi (Hradský, 1980)
- Molobratia nipponi (Hradský, 1980)
- Molobratia pekinensis (Bigot, 1878)
- Molobratia sapporensis (Matsumura, 1916)
- Molobratia triangulata (Haupt & Azuma, 1998)
- Molobratia youngi (Geller-Grimm, 2005)

=== Genus Myaptexaria ===
- Myaptexaria acutus (Artigas, 1980)
- Myaptexaria vexillaria (Artigas, 1970)
- Myaptexaria virilis (Artigas, 1970)

=== Genus Myelaphus ===
- Myelaphus dispar (Loew, 1873)
- Myelaphus jozanus (Matsumura, 1916)
