= List of Microstylum species =

This is a list of 135 species in Microstylum, a genus of robber flies in the family Asilidae.

== Microstylum species ==
- Microstylum acutirostre Loew, 1852^{c g}
- Microstylum albimystaecum Macquart, 1855^{c g}
- Microstylum albolimbatum Wulp, 1898^{c g}
- Microstylum amoyense Bigot, 1878^{c g}
- Microstylum ananthakrishnani Joseph & Parui, 1984^{c g}
- Microstylum anovense Oldroyd, 1980^{c g}
- Microstylum apicale (Wiedemann, 1821)^{c g}
- Microstylum apiforme (Walker, 1851)^{c g}
- Microstylum appendiculatum Macquart, 1847^{c g}
- Microstylum atrorubens Timon-David, 1952^{c g}
- Microstylum balbillus (Walker, 1849)^{c g}
- Microstylum barbarosa (Wiedemann, 1828)^{c g}
- Microstylum basalis Brunetti, 1928^{c g}
- Microstylum basirufum Bigot, 1878^{c g}
- Microstylum bhattacharyai Joseph & Parui, 1984^{c g}
- Microstylum bicolor Macquart, 1850^{c g}
- Microstylum biggsi Oldroyd, 1960^{c g}
- Microstylum bloesum (Walker, 1849)^{c g}
- Microstylum braunsi Engel, 1932^{c g}
- Microstylum brevipennatum Bigot, 1878^{c g}
- Microstylum bromleyi Timon-David, 1952^{c g}
- Microstylum brunnipenne Macquart, 1850^{c g}
- Microstylum capense (Fabricius, 1805)^{c g}
- Microstylum capucinum Bigot, 1878^{c g}
- Microstylum catastygnum Papavero, 1971^{c g}
- Microstylum cilipes Macquart, 1838^{c g}
- Microstylum cinctum Bromley, 1931^{c g}
- Microstylum coimbatorensis Joseph & Parui, 1987^{c g}
- Microstylum decretus (Walker, 1860)^{c g}
- Microstylum difficile (Wiedemann, 1828)^{c g}
- Microstylum dispar Loew, 1858^{c g}
- Microstylum dux (Wiedemann, 1828)^{c g}
- Microstylum elongatum Bigot, 1878^{c g}
- Microstylum erythropygum Bigot, 1878^{c g}
- Microstylum eximiun Bigot, 1878^{c g}
- Microstylum fafner (Enderlein, 1914)^{c g}
- Microstylum fenestratum (Wiedemann, 1828)^{c g}
- Microstylum flavipenne Macquart, 1846^{c g}
- Microstylum flaviventre Macquart, 1850^{c g}
- Microstylum fulvicaudatum Bigot, 1878^{c g}
- Microstylum fulviventre Wulp, 1898^{c g}
- Microstylum galactodes Loew, 1866^{i c g b}
- Microstylum gigas (Wiedemann, 1821)^{c g}
- Microstylum gladiator Bromley, 1927^{c g}
- Microstylum griseum Bromley, 1927^{c g}
- Microstylum gulosum Loew, 1858^{c g}
- Microstylum haemorrhoidale Bigot, 1878^{c g}
- Microstylum helenae Bezzi, 1914^{c g}
- Microstylum hermanni Ricardo, 1925^{c g}
- Microstylum hiritipes Ricardo, 1925^{c g}
- Microstylum hobbyi Bromley, 1947^{c g}
- Microstylum imbutum (Walker, 1851)^{c g}
- Microstylum incomptum (Walker, 1856)^{c g}
- Microstylum indutum Rondani, 1875^{c g}
- Microstylum insigne Bromley, 1927^{c g}
- Microstylum lacteipenne (Wiedemann, 1828)^{c g}
- Microstylum lambertoni Bromley, 1931^{c g}
- Microstylum leucacanthum Bezzi, 1908^{c g}
- Microstylum libo Walker, 1849^{c g}
- Microstylum lituratum Loew, 1863^{c g}
- Microstylum luciferoides Bromley, 1942^{c g}
- Microstylum luciferum Bromley, 1931^{c g}
- Microstylum lugubre (Wiedemann, 1828)^{c g}
- Microstylum magnum Bromley, 1927^{c g}
- Microstylum marudamalaiensis Joseph & Parui, 1987^{c g}
- Microstylum melanomystax Enderlein, 1914^{c g}
- Microstylum mexicanus Martin, 1960^{c g}
- Microstylum miles Karsch, 1879^{c g}
- Microstylum morosum Loew, 1872^{i c g b}
- Microstylum mydas Engel, 1932^{c g}
- Microstylum nigrescens Ricardo, 1900^{c g}
- Microstylum nigribarbatum Bigot, 1878^{c g}
- Microstylum nigricauda (Wiedemann, 1824)^{c g}
- Microstylum nigricorne Enderlein, 1914^{c g}
- Microstylum nigricuada (Wiedemann, 1824)^{c g}
- Microstylum nigrimystaceum Ricardo, 1925^{c g}
- Microstylum nigrinum Enderlein, 1914^{c g}
- Microstylum nigrisetosum Efflatoun, 1937^{c g}
- Microstylum nigritarse Bromley, 1927^{c g}
- Microstylum nigrostriatum Hobby, 1933^{c g}
- Microstylum nigrum Bigot, 1859^{c g}
- Microstylum nitidiventre Bigot, 1878^{c g}
- Microstylum oberthurii Wulp, 1896^{c g}
- Microstylum otacilius (Walker, 1849)^{c g}
- Microstylum parcum Karsch, 1888^{c g}
- Microstylum partitum (Walker, 1856)^{c}
- Microstylum pauliani Timon-David, 1952^{c g}
- Microstylum pica Macquart, 1846^{c g}
- Microstylum pollex Oldroyd, 1970^{c g}
- Microstylum polygnotus (Walker, 1849)^{c g}
- Microstylum proclive (Walker, 1860)^{c g}
- Microstylum proximum Oldroyd, 1960^{c g}
- Microstylum pseudoananthakrishnani Joseph & Parui, 1989^{c g}
- Microstylum pulchrum Bromley, 1927^{c g}
- Microstylum rabodae Karsch, 1884^{c g}
- Microstylum radamae Karsch, 1884^{c g}
- Microstylum remicorne Loew, 1863^{c g}
- Microstylum rhypae (Walker, 1849)^{c g}
- Microstylum ricardoae Oldroyd, 1970^{c g}
- Microstylum rubigenis Bromley, 1927^{c g}
- Microstylum rubripes Macquart, 1838^{c g}
- Microstylum rufianale (Macquart, 1850)^{c g}
- Microstylum rufinevrum Macquart, 1855^{c g}
- Microstylum rufoabdominalis Brunetti, 1928^{c g}
- Microstylum rufum Ricardo, 1925^{c g}
- Microstylum sagitta Bigot, 1878^{c g}
- Microstylum saverrio (Walker, 1849)^{c g}
- Microstylum scython (Walker, 1849)^{c g}
- Microstylum seguyi Timon-David, 1952^{c g}
- Microstylum sessile Bezzi, 1908^{c g}
- Microstylum simplicissimum Loew, 1852^{c g}
- Microstylum sordidum Walker, 1854^{c g}
- Microstylum spectrum (Wiedemann, 1828)^{c g}
- Microstylum spinipes Ricardo, 1925^{c g}
- Microstylum spurinum (Walker, 1849)^{c g}
- Microstylum strigatum Enderlein, 1914^{c g}
- Microstylum sumatranum Enderlein, 1914^{c g}
- Microstylum sura (Walker, 1849)^{c g}
- Microstylum taeniatum (Wiedemann, 1828)^{c g}
- Microstylum tananarivense Bromley, 1931^{c g}
- Microstylum testaceum (Macquart, 1846)^{c}
- Microstylum trimelas (Walker, 1851)^{c g}
- Microstylum umbrosum Bromley, 1931^{c g}
- Microstylum unicolor Ricardo, 1925^{c g}
- Microstylum ustulatum Engel & Cuthbertson, 1938^{c g}
- Microstylum validum Loew, 1858^{c g}
- Microstylum varipennatum Bigot, 1878^{c g}
- Microstylum varshneyi Joseph & Parui, 1984^{c g}
- Microstylum venosum (Wiedemann, 1821)^{c g}
- Microstylum vespertilio Engel, 1932^{c g}
- Microstylum vestitum Rondani, 1875^{c g}
- Microstylum vica (Walker, 1849)^{c g}
- Microstylum villosum Bigot, 1878^{c g}
- Microstylum vulcan Bromley, 1928^{c g}
- Microstylum whitei Brunetti, 1928^{c g}

Data sources: i = ITIS, c = Catalogue of Life, g = GBIF, b = Bugguide.net
