= Manx robber fly =

Scientific classification
- Kingdom: Animalia
- Phylum: Arthropoda
- Clade: Pancrustacea
- Class: Insecta
- Order: Diptera
- Family: Asilidae
- Genus: Machimus
- Species: M. cowini

Binomial name
- Machimus cowini (Hobby, 1946)

Synonyms
- Epitriptus cowini Hobby, 1946

Species of fly

The Manx robber fly (Machimus cowini, Manx: quaillag roosteyr Manninagh) is one of 7,100 species of robber fly or Asilidae known throughout the world, and one of 28 asilids known to occur in the British Isles.

== Identification ==
It is a small, grey-black asilid (10-15 mm.) Difficult to distinguish from other Machimus. Wolff, Gebel and Geller-Grimm (2021), ( Majer (1997), van den Broek (1979), Stubbs and Falk (2001) all provide keys, descriptions and illustrations. Older works are also useful

== Distribution and habitat ==
The Manx robber fly was first discovered on the Isle of Man in the 1940s, hence the name 'Manx', meaning from the Isle of Man, although this species has been referred to as the Irish robber fly in British Soldierflies and their Allies. It was originally thought to be endemic to the island but has since also been found across the Irish Sea on sand dunes on the east coast of Ireland. There is only one authenticated record from the United Kingdom. Speight also found the fly in Germany in 1987 and has identified flies from museum specimens collected from north Germany, the Netherlands, northern France and Hungary to be M. cowini, not M. cingulatus as formerly believed.

It was first discovered in curragh (willow carr/swamp) habitat in the north of Isle of Man and was recorded there again in the mid-1990s, when a pair was caught in a pan trap by Steve Crellin, a local entomologist. Although found in the curragh, this pair were probably associated with a man-made sod hedge. Furthermore, it is believed that a former locality of the species, on road verges and farmland near the old Ballamona Hospital, just outside Douglas, the capital of the Isle of Man, have been unknowingly destroyed by road widening and other ribbon development, as an ecological survey undertaken before the building of the new Nobles Hospital failed to locate any specimens despite extensive trapping and surveying. The robber fly still exists at a number of sites throughout the north of the Isle of Man, including The Ayres National Nature Reserve and Manx Wildlife Trust's reserve at Cronk y Bing, where it is probably associated with dry sandy conditions (possibly its larval habitat) and vegetation such as brambles and gorse which provide perching sites.

Speight noted flourishing colonies along the sandy coasts of the north-east Isle of Man in 1987.

== Taxonomy ==
The scientific name of the species, Machimus cowini (Hobby, 1946), comes from the entomologist who discovered the species, W. S. Cowin. The scientific name of the species was once Epitriptus cowini; however, it was renamed Machimus cowini after being placed in the genus Machimus.

== Conservation ==
The conservation status of the species is currently unknown; however, the Manx Wildlife Trust and Manx National Trust, through the creation of nature reserves, have saved the habitat of the robber fly from total destruction.

== Miscellaneous ==
In 1979 the Isle of Man Post Office issued a 13-pence stamp to celebrate 100 years of the Manx Natural History & Antiquarian Society. Painted by J. H. Nicholson, it depicts the Manx robber fly, and gives its former binomial name Epitriptus cowini. On 1 February 2001 the Isle of Man Post Office again issued a stamp depicting the Manx robber fly, in the series named 'Bugs and Bees', with the value of 58 pence.
