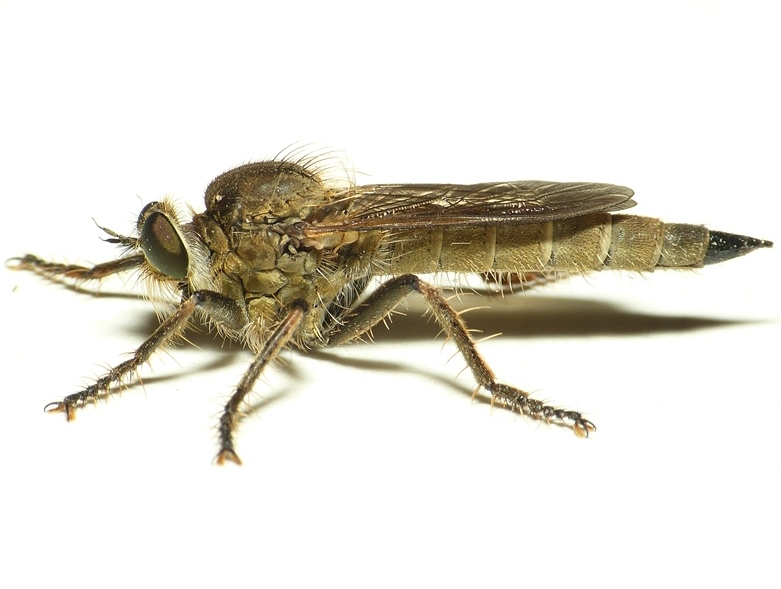
- Machimus arthriticus the Renkum Netherlands

Scientific classification
- Kingdom: Animalia
- Phylum: Arthropoda
- Clade: Pancrustacea
- Class: Insecta
- Order: Diptera
- Family: Asilidae
- Genus: Machimus
- Species: M. arthriticus

Binomial name
- Machimus arthriticus (Zeller, 1840)

= Machimus arthriticus =

Species of fly

Machimus arthriticus is a Palearctic species of robber fly in the family Asilidae.

The body length to 19 mm. It is grey-dusted robberfly resembling a small Machimus rusticus or Eutolmus rufibarbis M. arthriticus has the tibiae more extensively yellowish than those two species.
