= British Entomological and Natural History Society =

British entomological society

The British Entomological and Natural History Society or BENHS is a British entomological society. It is based at Dinton Pastures Country Park in Reading, England.

== History ==
BENHS was founded in 1872 as the South London Entomological and Natural History Society.

== Publications ==
BENHS publishes a quarterly journal, the British Journal of Entomology and Natural History (ISSN 0952-7583), formerly Proceedings and Transactions of the British Entomological and Natural History Society, and Proceedings and Transactions of the South London Entomological and Natural History Society.

BENHS has published a number of books. Among the most well-known are two illustrated identification guides to British flies:

- Stubbs, Alan E. and Steven J. Falk (1983) British Hoverflies, an illustrated identification guide
- Stubbs, Alan E. and Martin Drake (2001) British Soldierflies and their allies

Another title published by BENHS was New British Beetles - species not in Joy's practical handbook by Peter J. Hodge and Richard A. Jones, a companion volume to Norman H. Joy's A Practical Handbook of British Beetles.

In 2024 BENHS published A checklist of the Lepidoptera of the British Isles (2nd Edition) edited by David J.L. Agassiz, Stella D. Beavan & Robert J. Heckford

== Affiliated societies ==
The following groups are affiliated to BENHS:

- Bees, Wasps and Ants Recording Society
- British Arachnological Society
- British Myriapod and Isopod Group
- British Plant Gall Society
- Coleopterists Society of Britain & Ireland
- Dipterists Forum
- Earthworm Society of Britain
