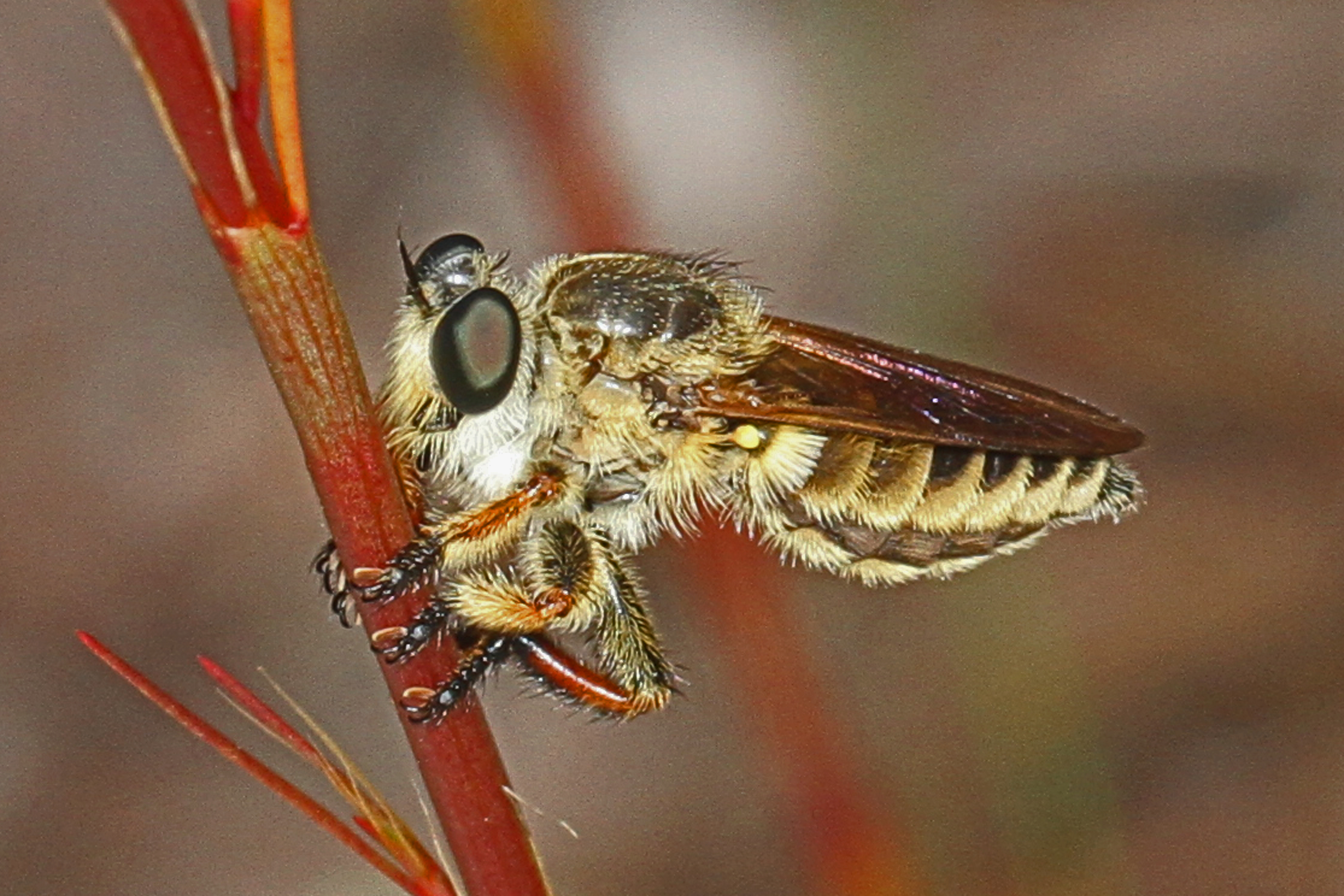
- Megaphorus clausicellus, Archbold Biological Station, Venus, Florida.

Scientific classification
- Domain: Eukaryota
- Kingdom: Animalia
- Phylum: Arthropoda
- Class: Insecta
- Order: Diptera
- Family: Asilidae
- Genus: Megaphorus
- Species: M. clausicellus

Binomial name
- Megaphorus clausicellus (Macquart, 1850)

Synonyms
- Mallophora clausicella Macquart, 1850

= Megaphorus clausicellus =

Species of fly

Megaphorus clausicellus is a species of robber flies in the family Asilidae. Their preferred habitat is open sandy area.
