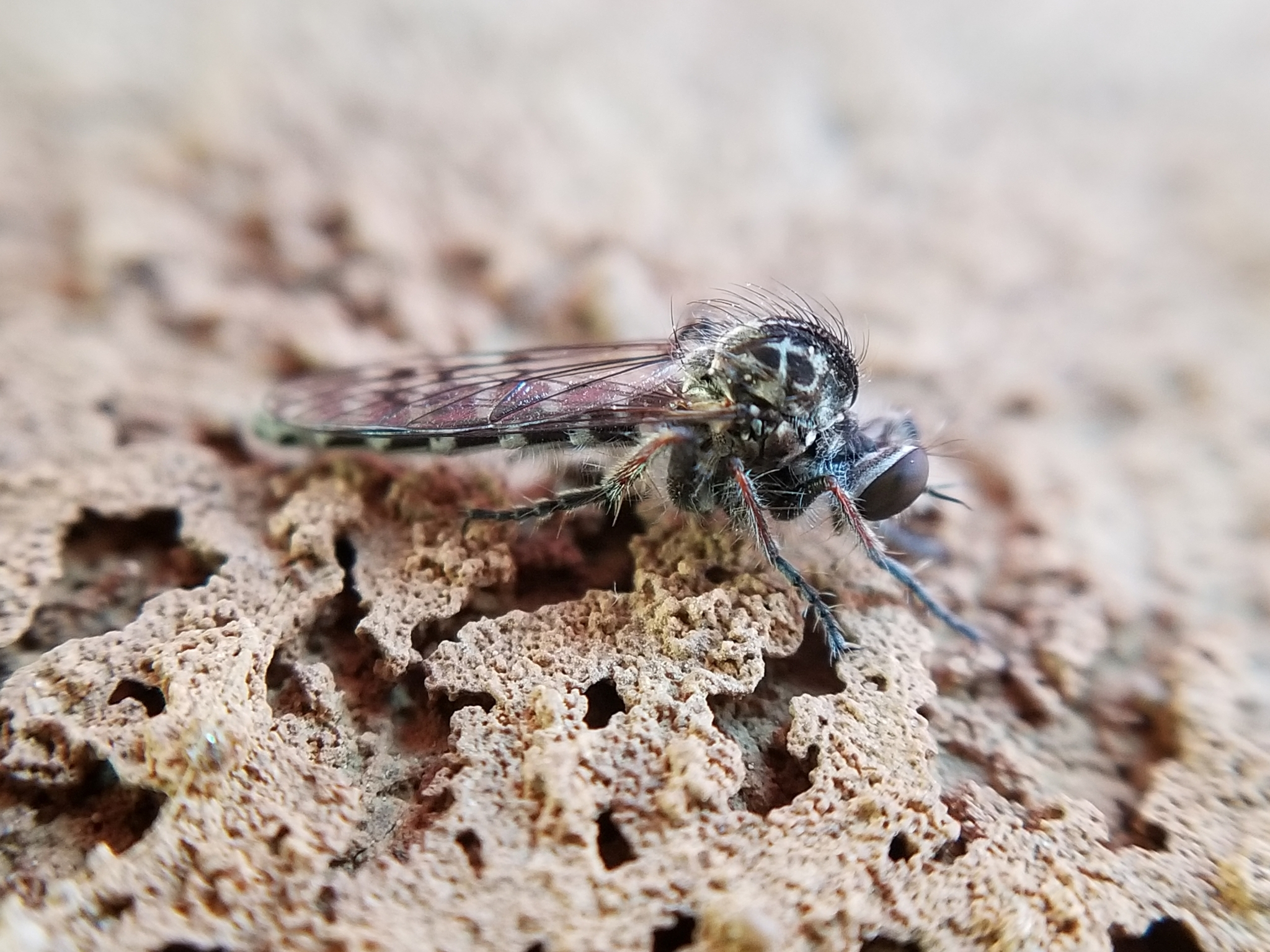

Scientific classification
- Kingdom: Animalia
- Phylum: Arthropoda
- Class: Insecta
- Order: Diptera
- Family: Asilidae
- Subfamily: Stenopogoninae
- Genus: Metapogon; Coquillett, 1904

= Metapogon =

Genus of flies

Metapogon is a genus of robber flies in the family Asilidae. There are about 13 species described in the genus Metapogon.

== Species ==
The following species are recognised in the genus Metapogon:

- Metapogon amargosae Wilcox, 1972^{i c g}
- Metapogon carinatus Wilcox, 1964^{i c g}
- Metapogon gibber (Williston, 1883)^{i c g}
- Metapogon gilvipes Coquillett, 1904^{i c g}
- Metapogon holbrooki Wilcox, 1964^{i c g}
- Metapogon hurdi Wilcox, 1964^{i c g}
- Metapogon incertus Becker, 1919^{c g}
- Metapogon leechi Wilcox, 1964^{c g}
- Metapogon obispae Wilcox, 1972^{i c g}
- Metapogon pictus Cole, 1916^{i c g}
- Metapogon punctipennis Coquillett, 1904^{i c g b}
- Metapogon tarsalus Wilcox, 1964^{i c g}
- Metapogon tricellus Wilcox, 1964^{i c g}

Data sources: i = ITIS, c = Catalogue of Life, g = GBIF, b = Bugguide.net
