= Machimus callidus =

Scientific classification
- Kingdom: Animalia
- Phylum: Arthropoda
- Class: Insecta
- Order: Diptera
- Family: Asilidae
- Genus: Machimus
- Species: M. callidus

Binomial name
- Machimus callidus (Williston, 1893)

Synonyms
- Asilus callidus Williston, 1893

Species of fly

Machimus callidus is a species of robber fly in the family Asilidae.
