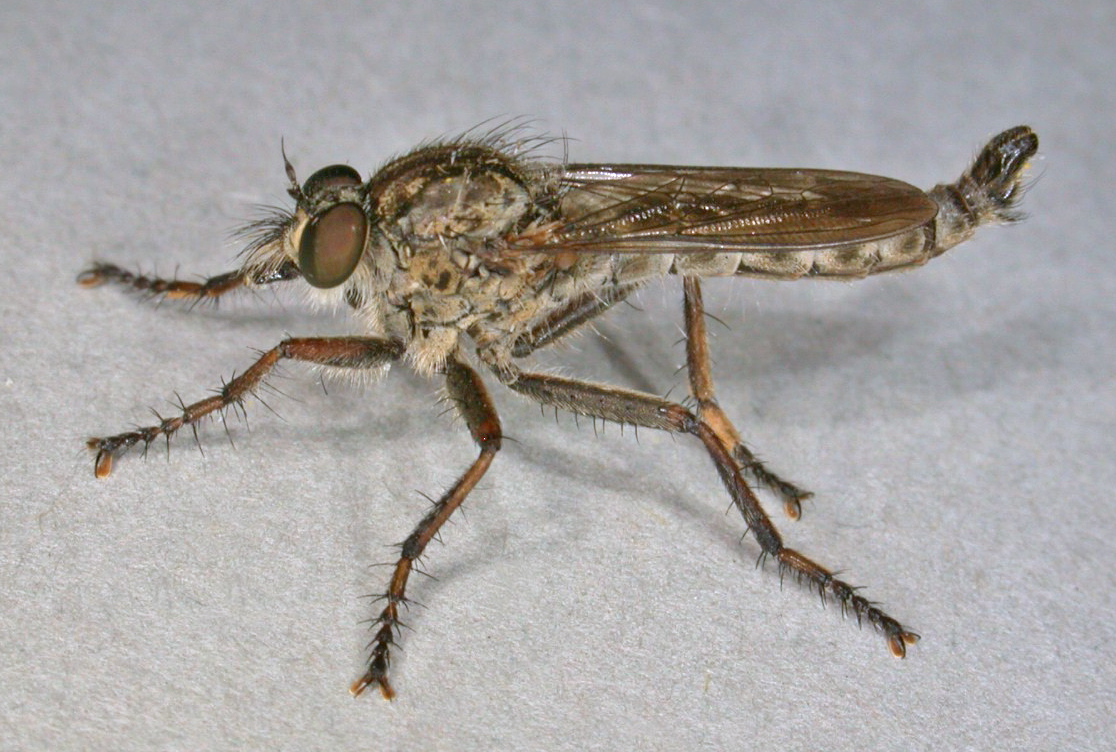
- Machimus atricapillus, North Wales

Scientific classification
- Kingdom: Animalia
- Phylum: Arthropoda
- Clade: Pancrustacea
- Class: Insecta
- Order: Diptera
- Family: Asilidae
- Genus: Machimus
- Species: M. atricapillus

Binomial name
- Machimus atricapillus (Fallén, 1814)

Synonyms
- Asilus atricapillus Fallén, 1814; Tolmerus atricapillus (Fallén, 1814)

= Machimus atricapillus =

Species of fly

Machimus atricapillus is a Palearctic species of robber fly in the family Asilidae.

== Identification ==
It is a small, grey-black asilid (11-14 mm.) Difficult to distinguish from other Machimus. Wolff, Gebel and Geller-Grimm (2021), ( Majer (1997), van den Broek (1979), Stubbs and Falk (2001) all provide keys, descriptions and illustrations. Older works are also useful eg.Seguy (1920).
