= Megaphorus megachile =

Scientific classification
- Domain: Eukaryota
- Kingdom: Animalia
- Phylum: Arthropoda
- Class: Insecta
- Order: Diptera
- Family: Asilidae
- Genus: Megaphorus
- Species: M. megachile

Binomial name
- Megaphorus megachile (Coquillett, 1893)

Synonyms
- Mallophora megachile Coquillett, 1893

Species of fly

Megaphorus megachile is a species of robber flies in the family Asilidae.
