= Machimus formosus =

Scientific classification
- Domain: Eukaryota
- Kingdom: Animalia
- Phylum: Arthropoda
- Class: Insecta
- Order: Diptera
- Family: Asilidae
- Genus: Machimus
- Species: M. formosus

Binomial name
- Machimus formosus (Hine, 1918)

Synonyms
- Asilus formosus Hine, 1918

Species of fly

Machimus formosus is a species of robber flies in the family Asilidae.
