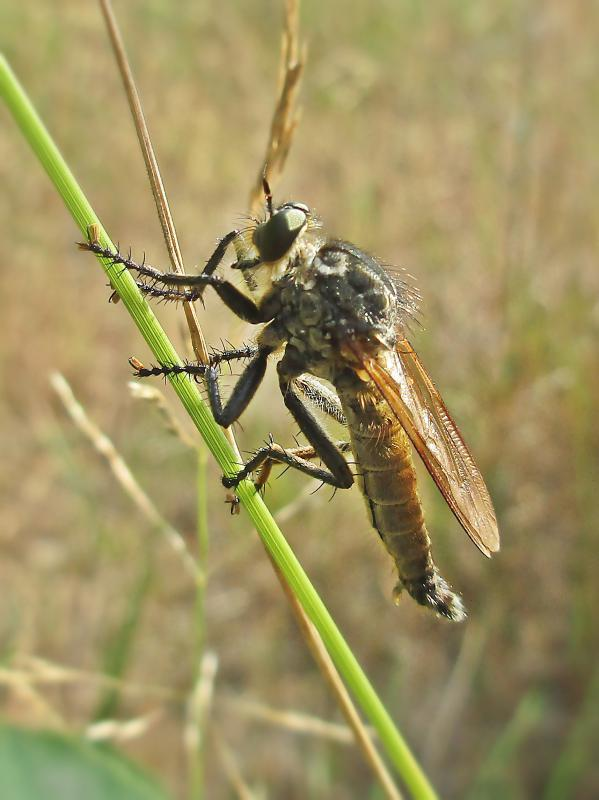
- Eutolmus rufibarbis, male, Swalmen, the Netherlands

Scientific classification
- Kingdom: Animalia
- Phylum: Arthropoda
- Clade: Pancrustacea
- Class: Insecta
- Order: Diptera
- Family: Asilidae
- Genus: Eutolmus
- Species: E. rufibarbis

Binomial name
- Eutolmus rufibarbis (Meigen, 1820)

= Eutolmus rufibarbis =

Species of fly

Eutolmus rufibarbis is a Palearctic species of robber fly in the family Asilidae.

== Identification ==
Body length 17 mm. long. Difficult to distinguish from other Eutolmus and some Dysmachus. Wolff, Gebel and Geller-Grimm (2021), ( Majer (1997), van den Broek (1979), Stubbs and Falk (2001) all provide keys, descriptions and illustrations. Older works are also useful eg. Seguy (1920)
