= Machimus paropus =

Scientific classification
- Kingdom: Animalia
- Phylum: Arthropoda
- Class: Insecta
- Order: Diptera
- Family: Asilidae
- Genus: Machimus
- Species: M. paropus

Binomial name
- Machimus paropus (Walker, 1849)

Synonyms
- Asilus paropus Walker, 1849; Tolmerus prospectus Tucker, 1907

Species of fly

Machimus paropus is a species of robber flies in the family Asilidae.
