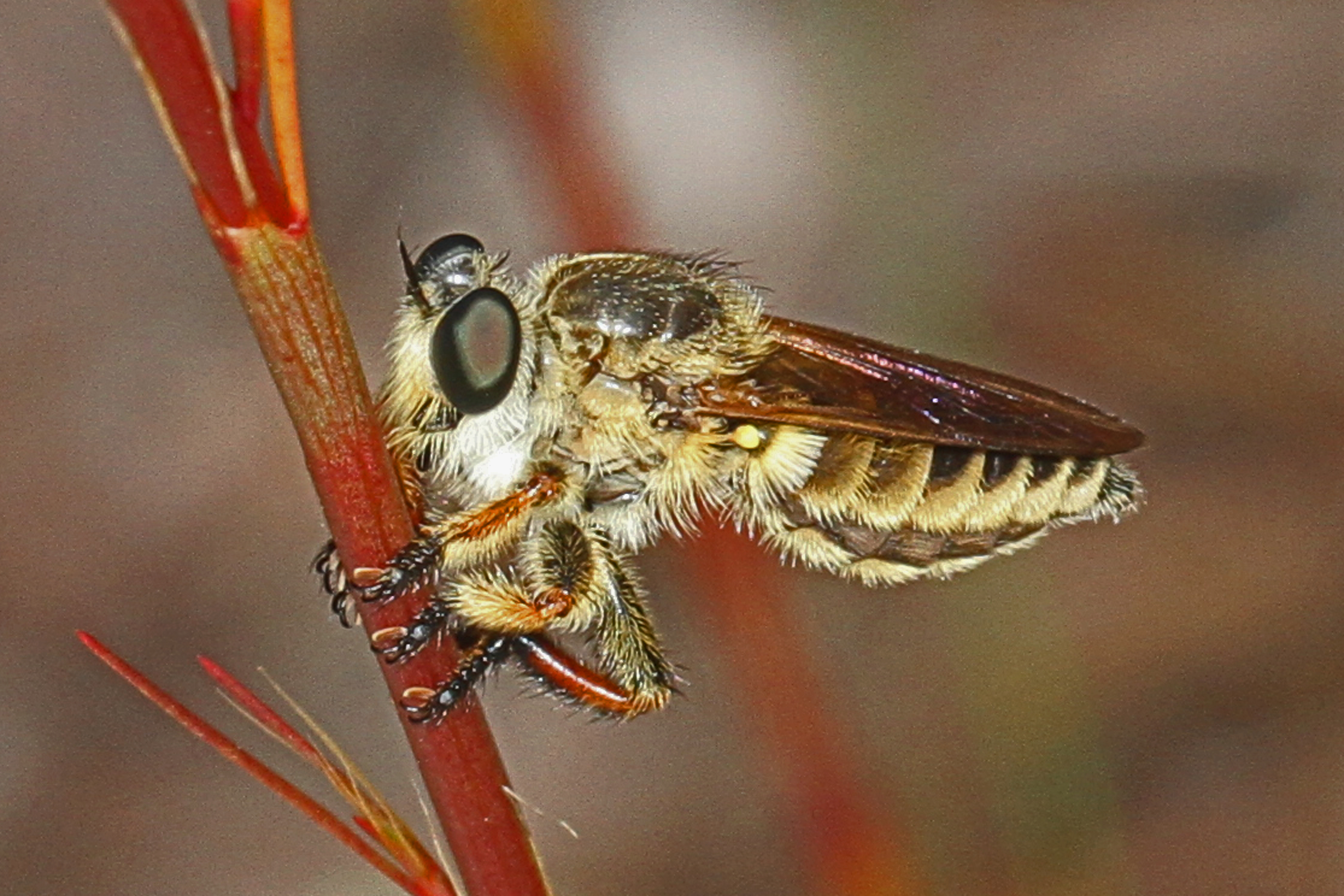
- Megaphorus clausicellus

Scientific classification
- Domain: Eukaryota
- Kingdom: Animalia
- Phylum: Arthropoda
- Class: Insecta
- Order: Diptera
- Family: Asilidae
- Subfamily: Asilinae
- Genus: Megaphorus; Bigot, 1857

= Megaphorus =

Genus of flies

Megaphorus is a genus of robber flies in the family Asilidae. There are about 18 described species in Megaphorus.

== Species ==
These 18 species belong to the genus Megaphorus:

- Megaphorus acrus (Curran, 1931)^{i c g b}
- Megaphorus brunneus (Cole, 1964)^{c g}
- Megaphorus clausicellus (Macquart, 1850)^{i c g b}
- Megaphorus durangoensis Cole & Pritchard, 1964^{c g}
- Megaphorus flavidus (Cole, 1964)^{c g b}
- Megaphorus frustra Cole & Pritchard, 1964^{c}
- Megaphorus frustrus (PRITCHARD, 1935)^{c g b}
- Megaphorus guildiana (Williston, 1885)^{i c g}
- Megaphorus intermedius (Tucker, 1907)^{i c g}
- Megaphorus laphroides (Wiedemann, 1828)^{i c g b}
- Megaphorus lascrucensis (Cole, 1964)^{i c g}
- Megaphorus martinorum (Cole, 1964)^{i c g}
- Megaphorus megachile (Coquillett, 1893)^{i c g b}
- Megaphorus minutus (Macquart, 1834)^{i c g b}
- Megaphorus pallidus (Johnson, 1958)^{i c g b}
- Megaphorus prudens (Pritchard, 1935)^{i c g b}
- Megaphorus pulchrus (Pritchard, 1935)^{i c g}
- Megaphorus willistoni (Cole, 1964)^{i c g b}

Data sources: i = ITIS, c = Catalogue of Life, g = GBIF, b = Bugguide.net
