= Megaphorus laphroides =

Scientific classification
- Domain: Eukaryota
- Kingdom: Animalia
- Phylum: Arthropoda
- Class: Insecta
- Order: Diptera
- Family: Asilidae
- Genus: Megaphorus
- Species: M. laphroides

Binomial name
- Megaphorus laphroides (Wiedemann, 1828)

Synonyms
- Asilus laphroides Wiedemann, 1828; Mallophora heteroptera Macquart, 1838

Species of fly

Megaphorus laphroides is a species of robber flies in the family Asilidae.
