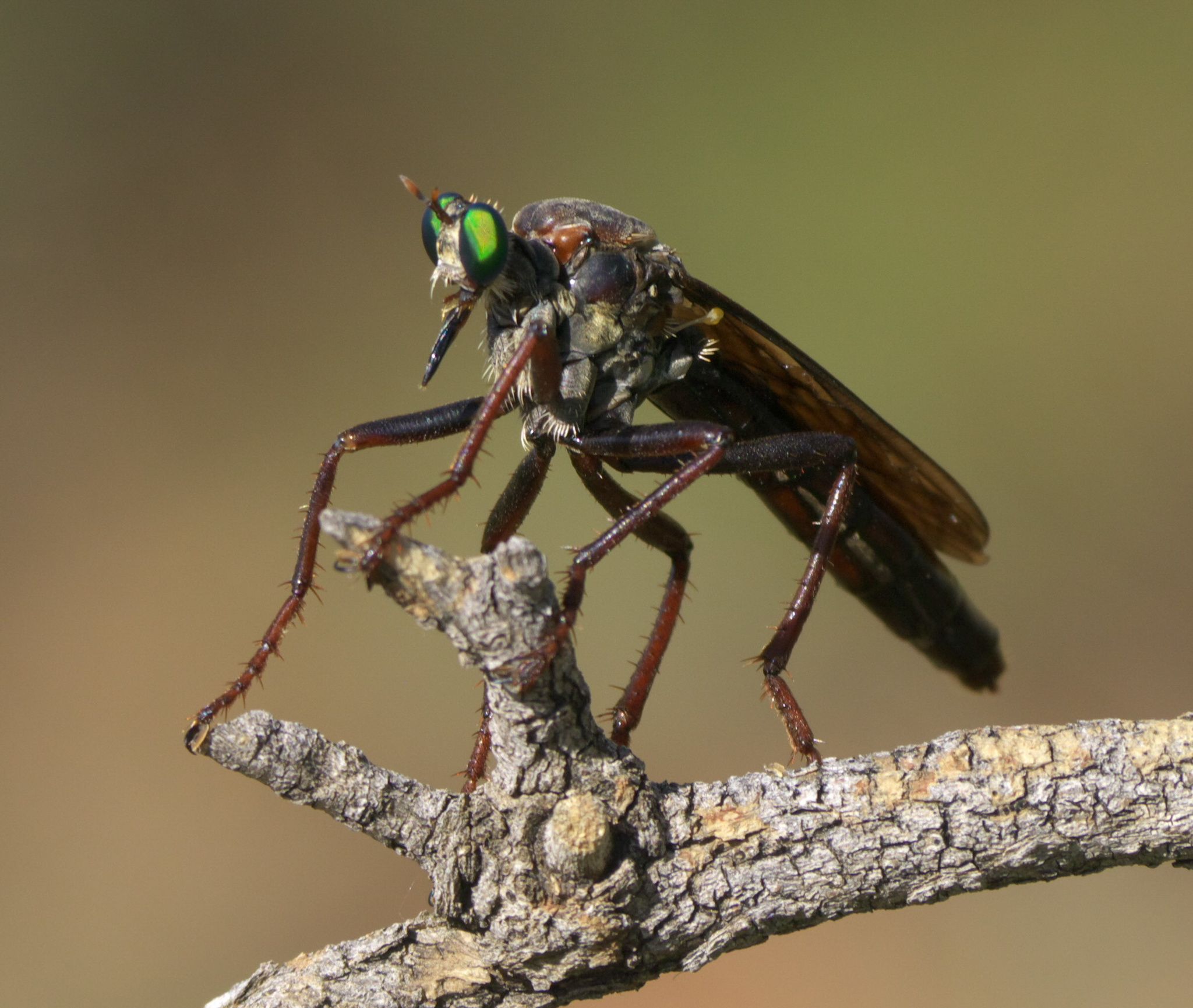
- Microstylum morosum, Oklahoma

Scientific classification
- Domain: Eukaryota
- Kingdom: Animalia
- Phylum: Arthropoda
- Class: Insecta
- Order: Diptera
- Family: Asilidae
- Genus: Microstylum
- Species: M. morosum

Binomial name
- Microstylum morosum Loew, 1872

Synonyms
- Microstylum pollens Osten Sacken, 1878

= Microstylum morosum =

Species of fly

Microstylum morosum is a species of robber flies in the family Asilidae.
