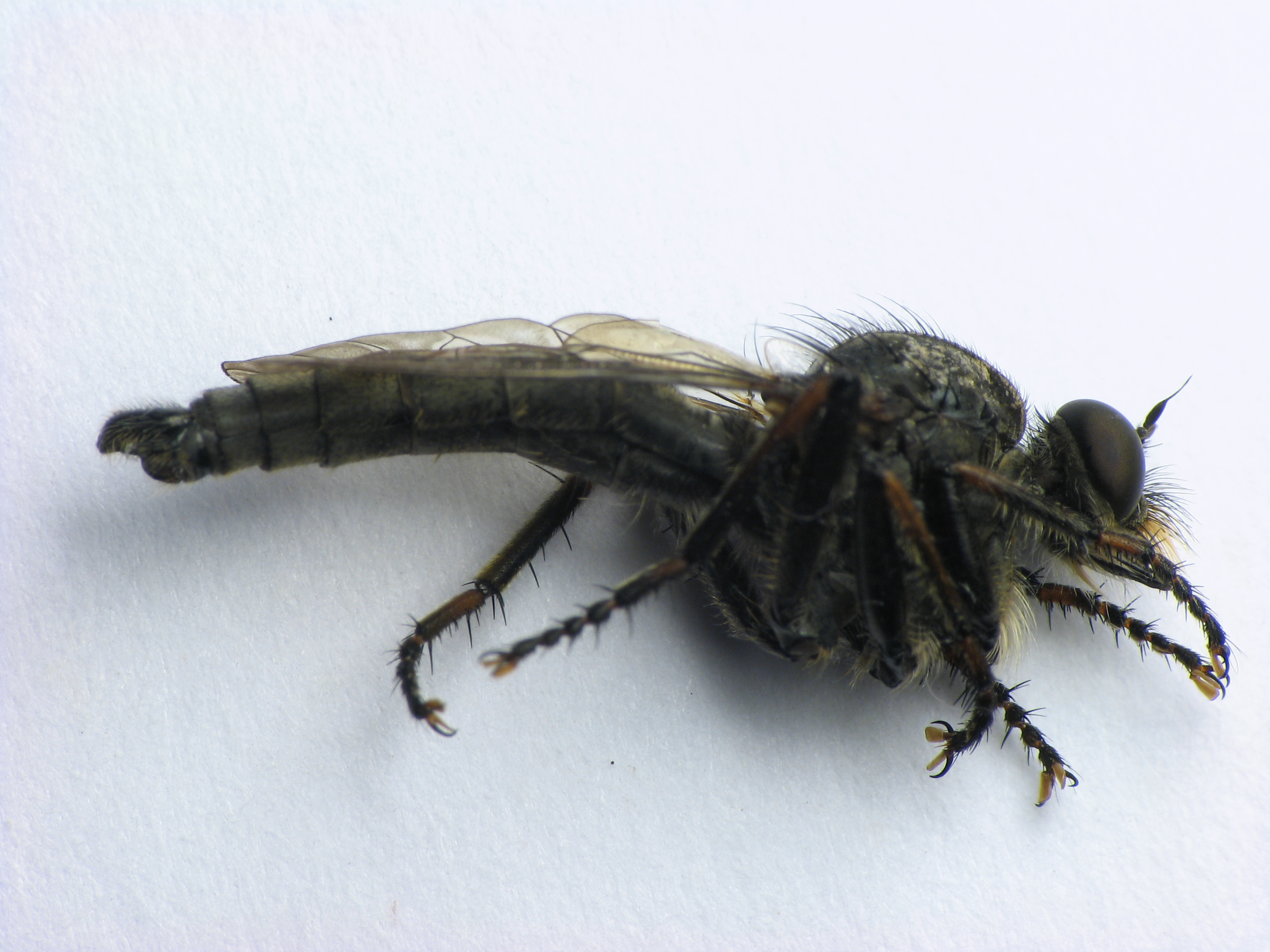

Scientific classification
- Domain: Eukaryota
- Kingdom: Animalia
- Phylum: Arthropoda
- Class: Insecta
- Order: Diptera
- Family: Asilidae
- Genus: Machimus
- Species: M. notatus

Binomial name
- Machimus notatus (Wiedemann, 1828)

Synonyms
- Asilus alethes Walker, 1849; Asilus notatus Wiedemann, 1828

= Machimus notatus =

Species of fly

Machimus notatus is a species of robber flies in the family Asilidae.
