= Machimus =

- with Tolmerus prey

Scientific classification
- Kingdom: Animalia
- Phylum: Arthropoda
- Clade: Pancrustacea
- Class: Insecta
- Order: Diptera
- Family: Asilidae
- Subfamily: Asilinae
- Genus: Machimus; Loew 1849

Species
- Many, see text

Genus of flies

Machimus is a genus of flies in the family Asilidae, the robber flies and assassin flies. They can be found nearly worldwide, except in Australia and New Zealand. Most are native to the Palearctic realm and southern Asia.

As of 2013 there were approximately 188 described species in the genus.

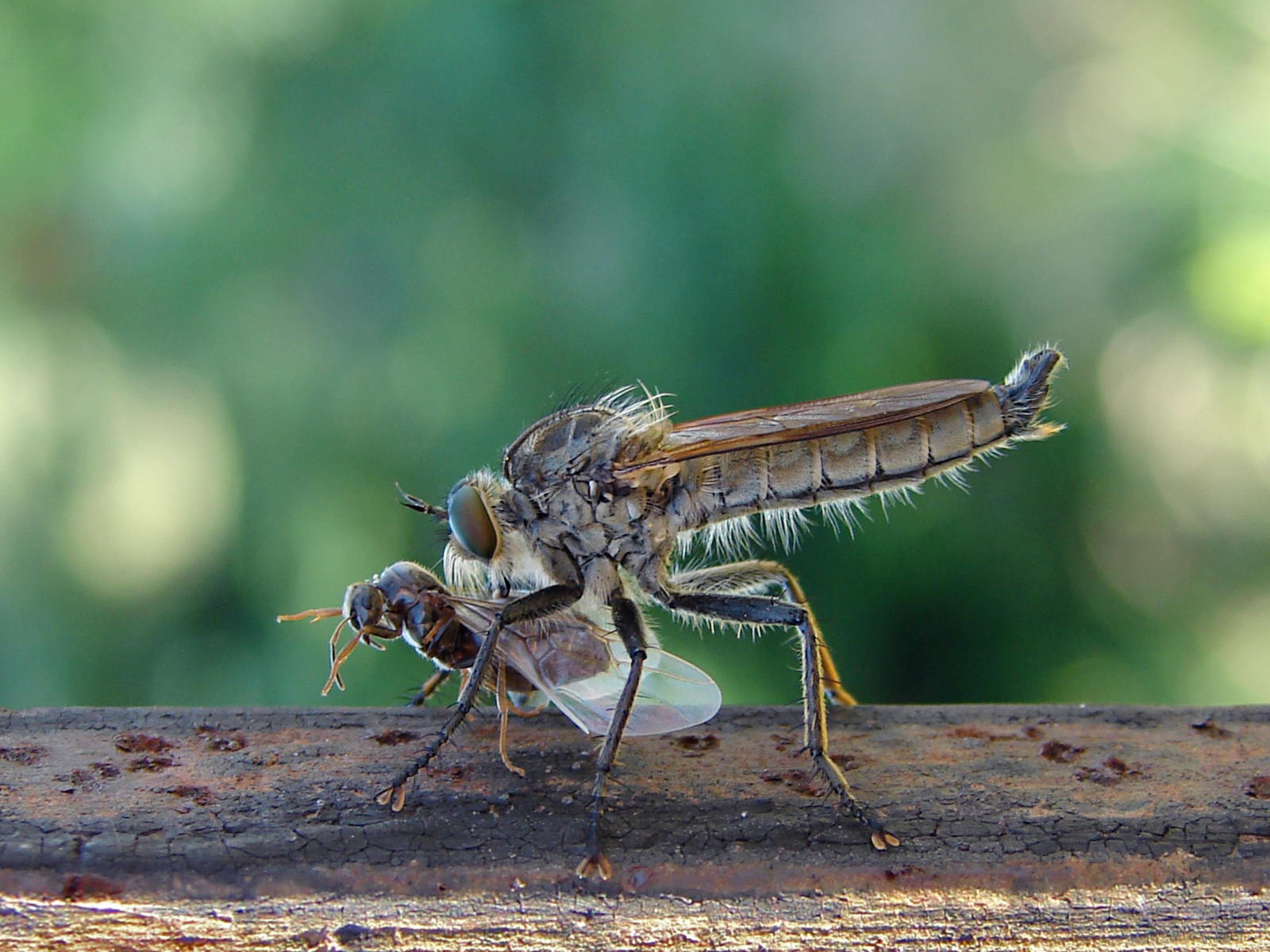
Machimus sp. with prey

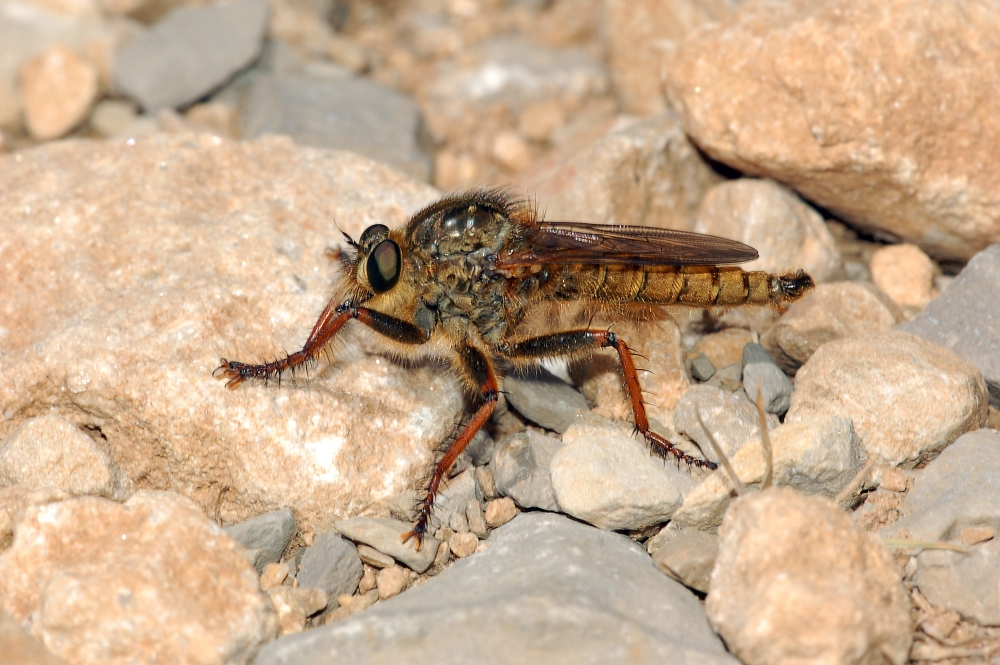
Machimus chrysitis

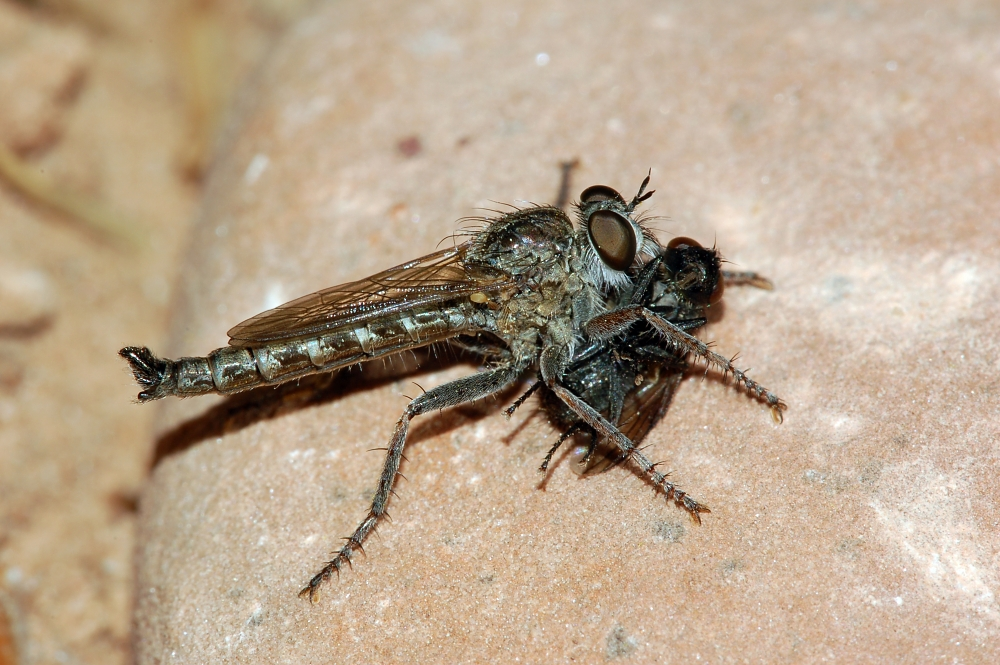
Machimus lacinulatus with prey

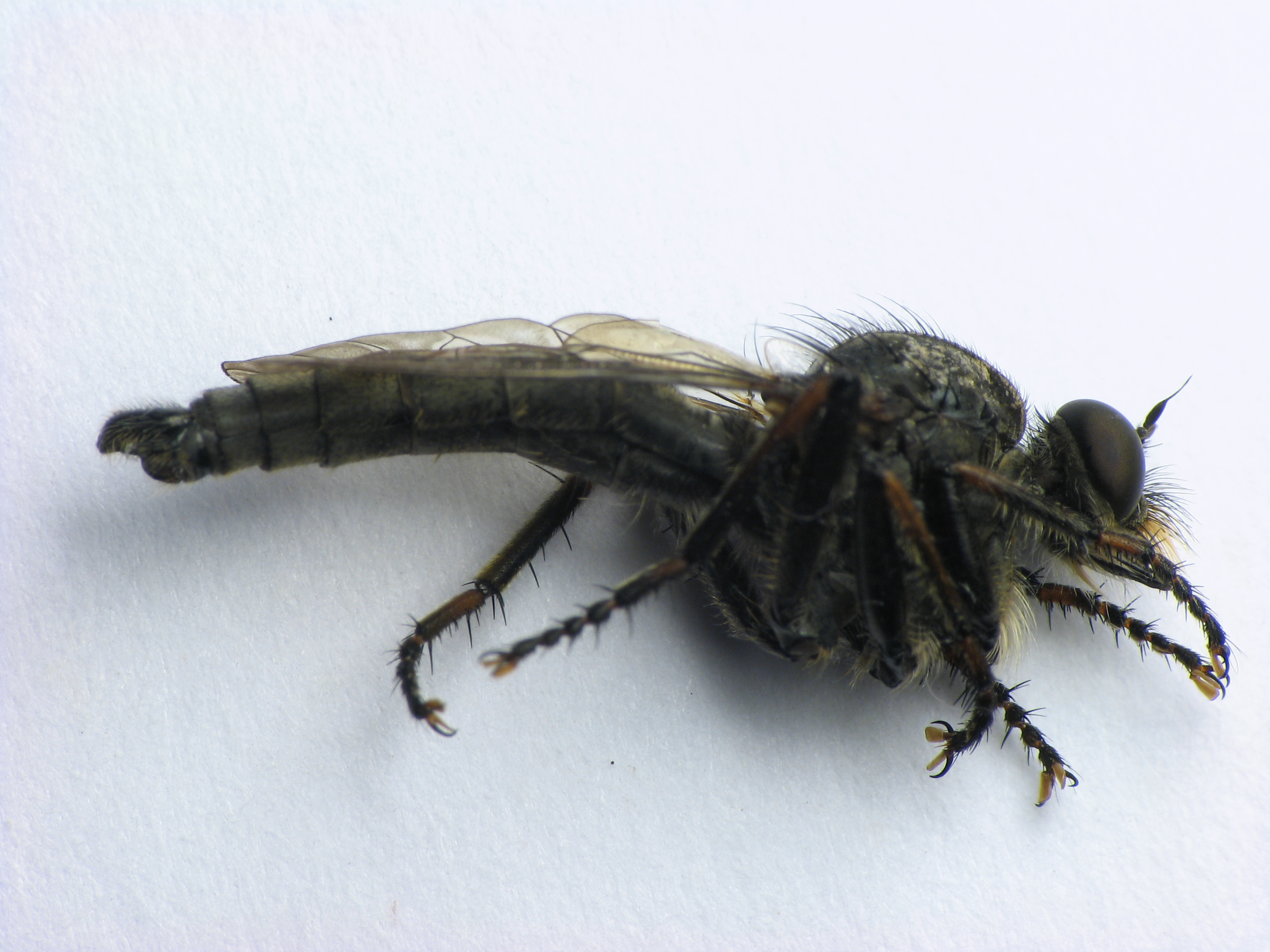
Machimus notatus

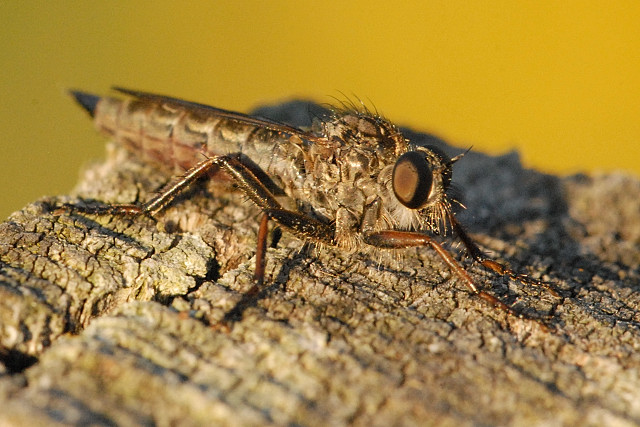
Machimus rusticus

Species include:

- Machimus aberrans
- Machimus adustus
- Machimus annulipes
- Machimus antennatus
- Machimus antimachus
- Machimus aradensis
- Machimus aridalis
- Machimus arthriticus
- Machimus atricapillus
- Machimus autumnalis
- Machimus barcelonicus
- Machimus biljici
- Machimus blantoni
- Machimus blascoi
- Machimus caliginosus
- Machimus callidus
- Machimus carolinae
- Machimus chrysitis
- Machimus cinerarius
- Machimus cingulatus
- Machimus citus
- Machimus coleus
- Machimus concinnus
- Machimus cowini – Manx robber fly
- Machimus cribratus
- Machimus cyanopus
- Machimus debilis
- Machimus delusus
- Machimus dubiosus
- Machimus elegans
- Machimus erythocnemius
- Machimus fattigi
- Machimus fimbriatus
- Machimus floridensis
- Machimus formosus
- Machimus fortis
- Machimus frosti
- Machimus gilvipes
- Machimus globifer
- Machimus gonatistes
- Machimus griseus
- Machimus hinei
- Machimus hubbelli
- Machimus ibizensis
- Machimus idiorrhytmicus
- Machimus javieri
- Machimus johnsoni
- Machimus krueperi
- Machimus lacinulatus
- Machimus latapex
- Machimus lecythus
- Machimus linearis
- Machimus longipenis
- Machimus lucentinus
- Machimus madeirensis
- Machimus maneei
- Machimus margaretae
- Machimus modestus
- Machimus monticola
- Machimus nahalalensis
- Machimus nevadensis
- Machimus nigrifemoratus
- Machimus notatus
- Machimus notialis
- Machimus novaescotiae
- Machimus occidentalis
- Machimus paropus
- Machimus pilipes
- Machimus portosanctanus
- Machimus prairiensis
- Machimus pyrenaicus
- Machimus rubidus
- Machimus rusticus
- Machimus sadyates
- Machimus sanctimontis
- Machimus sareptanus
- Machimus setibarbus
- Machimus setiventris
- Machimus snowii
- Machimus stanfordae
- Machimus subdolus
- Machimus tephraeus
- Machimus thoracius
- Machimus vescus
- Machimus virginicus
