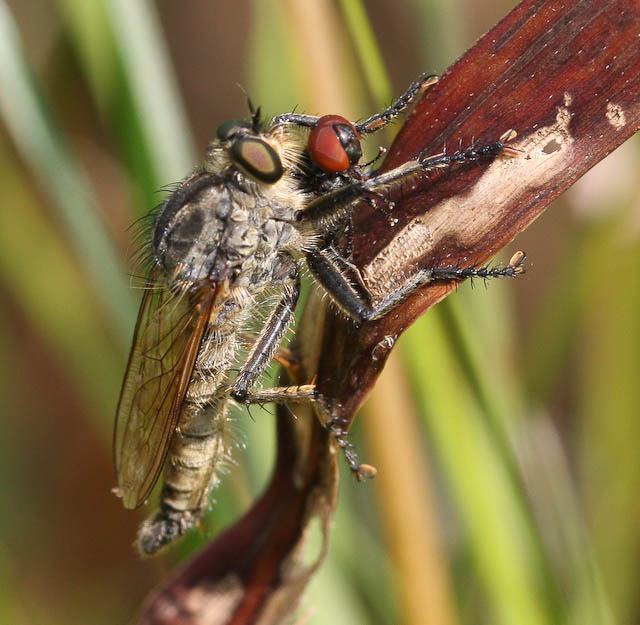
- D. trigonus with prey

Scientific classification
- Kingdom: Animalia
- Phylum: Arthropoda
- Clade: Pancrustacea
- Class: Insecta
- Order: Diptera
- Family: Asilidae
- Genus: Dysmachus
- Species: D. trigonus

Binomial name
- Dysmachus trigonus (Meigen, 1804)

= Dysmachus trigonus =

Species of fly

Dysmachus trigonus, the fan-bristled robberfly, is a species of robber fly (family Asilidae). It preys on other insects in flight.

== Identification ==
Body length 17 mm. long. Difficult to distinguish from other Dysmachus. Seguy (1927) Wolff, Gebel and Geller-Grimm (2021), ( Majer (1997), van den Broek (1979), Stubbs and Falk (2001) all provide keys, descriptions and illustrations. Older works are also useful eg. Seguy (1920) Verrall (1909 )(Oldroyd (1969)

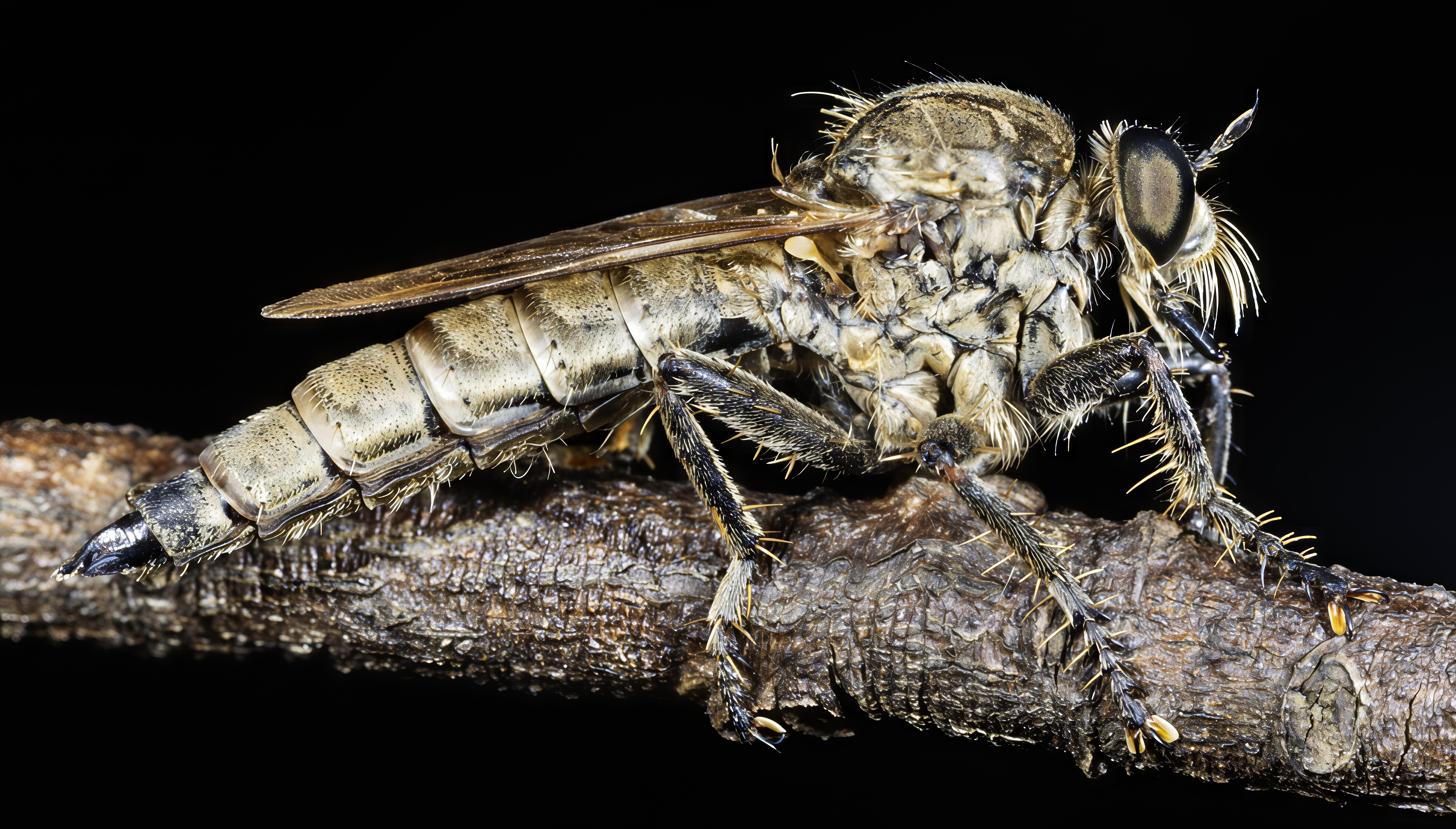
Dysmachus trigonus lateral view

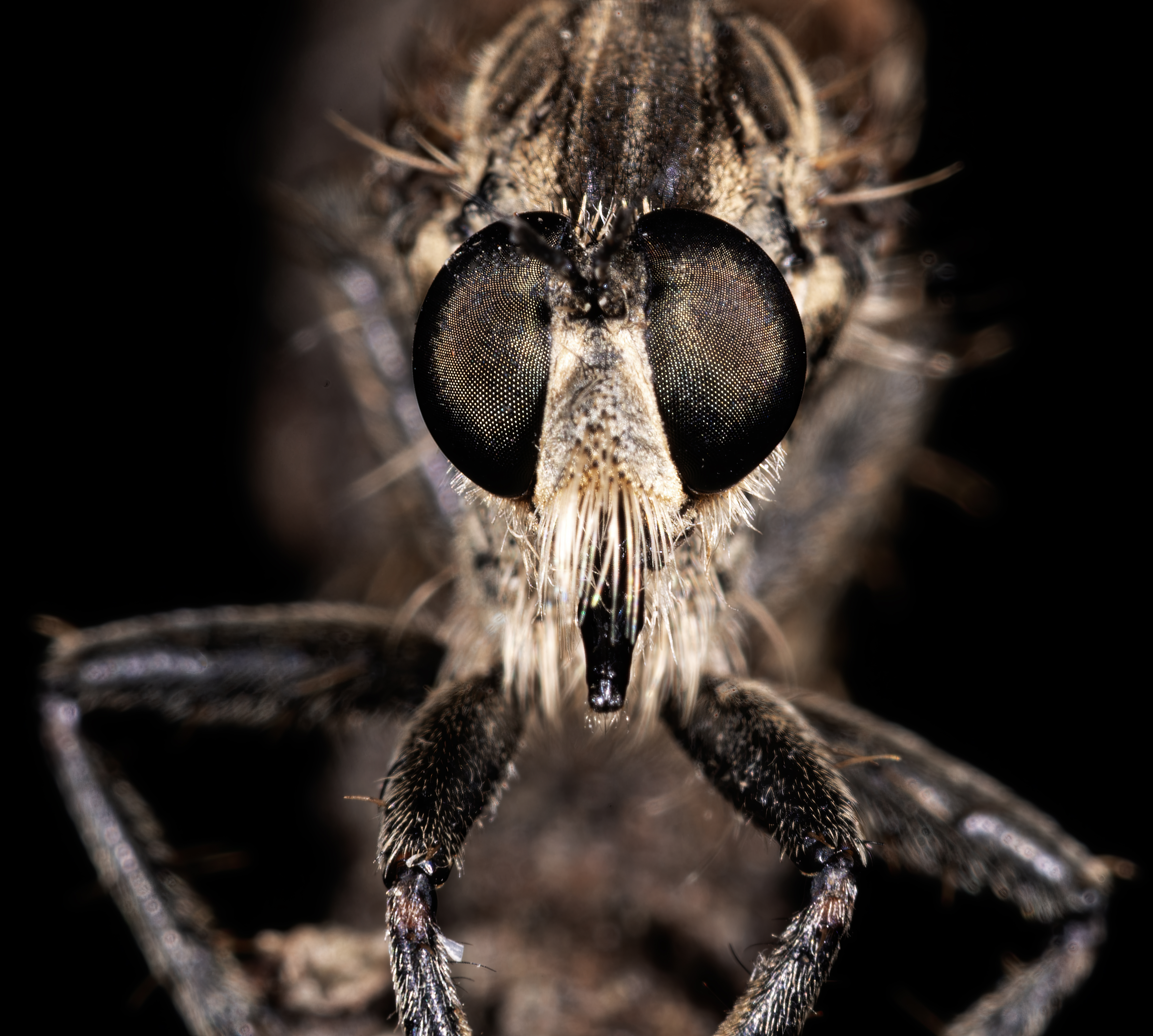
Dysmachus trigonus Portrait
