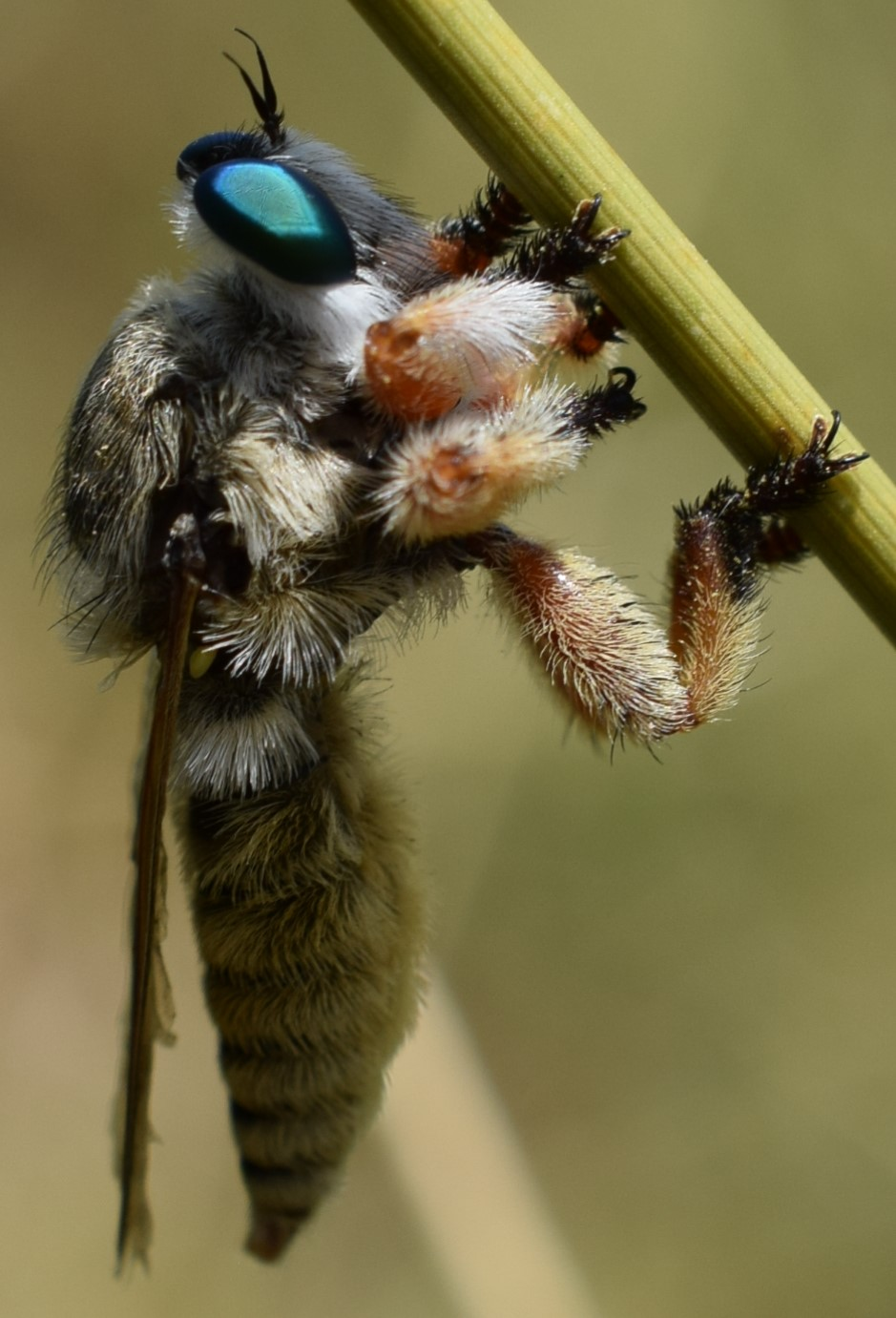

Scientific classification
- Domain: Eukaryota
- Kingdom: Animalia
- Phylum: Arthropoda
- Class: Insecta
- Order: Diptera
- Family: Asilidae
- Genus: Megaphorus
- Species: M. acrus

Binomial name
- Megaphorus acrus (Curran, 1931)

Synonyms
- Mallophora acra Curran, 1931

= Megaphorus acrus =

Species of fly

Megaphorus acrus is a species of robber flies in the family Asilidae.
