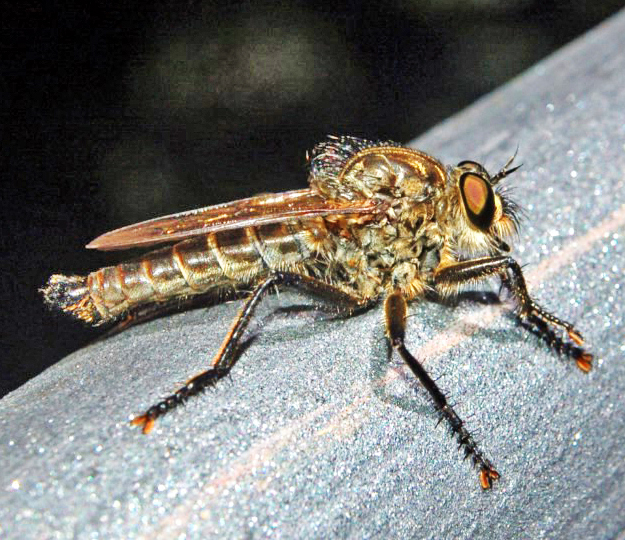
- Male

Scientific classification
- Domain: Eukaryota
- Kingdom: Animalia
- Phylum: Arthropoda
- Class: Insecta
- Order: Diptera
- Family: Asilidae
- Genus: Machimus
- Species: M. setibarbus

Binomial name
- Machimus setibarbus (Loew, 1849)

Synonyms
- Asilus setibarbus Loew, 1849

= Machimus setibarbus =

Species of fly

Machimus setibarbus is a species of fly in the family Asilidae, the robber flies and assassin flies.

== Distribution ==
This species is widespread in Europe (Bulgaria, Bosnia and Herzegovina, Denmark, Croatia, Germany, Finland, Greece, Italy, former Yugoslavia, Norway, Russia, Poland, Romania, Sweden, Switzerland, Spain, Czech Republic, Slovakia), North Africa (Tunisia), and in the Near East (Israel).

== Description ==
Machimus setibarbus can reach a body length of about 16–27 millimetres (0.63–1.06 in). These robber flies have a face beard with distinctly stout bristles and four-eight scutellar marginal bristles. Legs are entirely black, but sometimes knees are paler. Moreover front femur do not show ventrally distinct stout bristles, but only hairs.
