= Megaphorus pallidus =

Scientific classification
- Domain: Eukaryota
- Kingdom: Animalia
- Phylum: Arthropoda
- Class: Insecta
- Order: Diptera
- Family: Asilidae
- Genus: Megaphorus
- Species: M. pallidus

Binomial name
- Megaphorus pallidus (Johnson, 1958)

Synonyms
- Mallophora pallida Johnson, 1958

Species of fly

Megaphorus pallidus is a species of robber flies in the family Asilidae.
