= Dipterists Forum =

British learned society

The Dipterists Forum is a British entomological society affiliated to the British Entomological and Natural History Society. It is primarily concerned with fostering the study of Diptera, and promoting the conservation of Diptera. The Dipterists Forum arranges a number of annual Field meetings, including a 7–9 day residential summer meeting, and identification workshops for both beginners and more experienced Dipterists.

== History ==
Dipterists Forum was founded in 1993 out on a number of Diptera recording groups run by the British Entomological and Natural History Society.

== Publications ==
- Bulletin of the Dipterists Forum - a newsletter, published twice yearly
- Dipterists Digest - a scientific journal, normally two issues per annum

== Affiliations ==
The Dipterists Forum is affiliated to the British Entomological and Natural History Society
