= Machimus lecythus =

Scientific classification
- Kingdom: Animalia
- Phylum: Arthropoda
- Class: Insecta
- Order: Diptera
- Family: Asilidae
- Genus: Machimus
- Species: M. lecythus

Binomial name
- Machimus lecythus (Walker, 1849)

Synonyms
- Asilus femoralis Macquart, 1847; Asilus lecythus Walker, 1849

Species of fly

Machimus lecythus is a species of robber flies in the family Asilidae.
