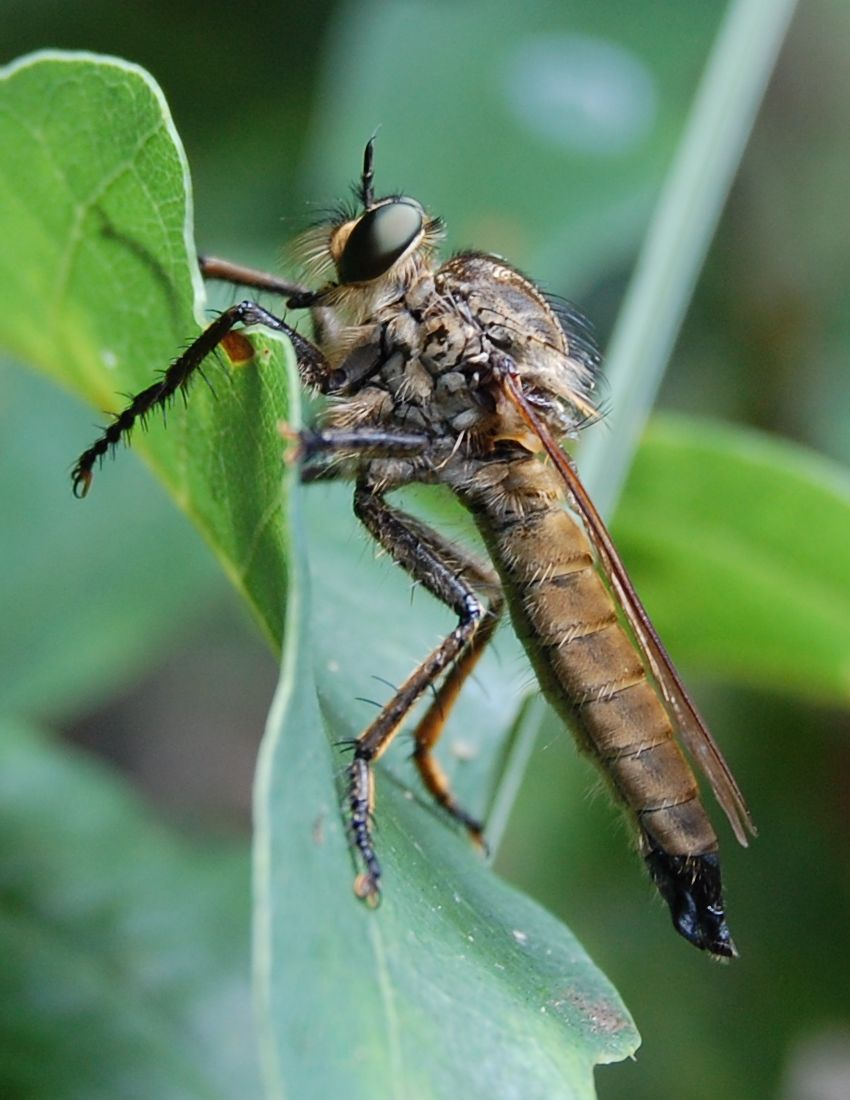
- Eutolmus rufibarbis

Scientific classification
- Domain: Eukaryota
- Kingdom: Animalia
- Phylum: Arthropoda
- Class: Insecta
- Order: Diptera
- Family: Asilidae
- Subfamily: Asilinae
- Genus: Eutolmus; Loew, 1848

= Eutolmus =

Genus of insects

Eutolmus is a genus of flies belonging to the family Asilidae.

The species of this genus are found in Europe and Northern America.

Species:

- Eutolmus albicapillus Janssens, 1968
- Eutolmus albiventris Villeneuve, 1920
- Eutolmus rufibarbis (Meigen, 1820)
