= Machimus maneei =

Scientific classification
- Domain: Eukaryota
- Kingdom: Animalia
- Phylum: Arthropoda
- Class: Insecta
- Order: Diptera
- Family: Asilidae
- Genus: Machimus
- Species: M. maneei

Binomial name
- Machimus maneei (Hine, 1909)

Synonyms
- Asilus maneei Hine, 1909

Species of fly

Machimus maneei is a species of robber flies in the family Asilidae.
