= Machimus novaescotiae =

Scientific classification
- Domain: Eukaryota
- Kingdom: Animalia
- Phylum: Arthropoda
- Class: Insecta
- Order: Diptera
- Family: Asilidae
- Genus: Machimus
- Species: M. novaescotiae

Binomial name
- Machimus novaescotiae (Macquart, 1847)

Synonyms
- Asilus novaescotiae Macquart, 1847

Species of fly

Machimus novaescotiae is a species of robber flies in the family Asilidae.
