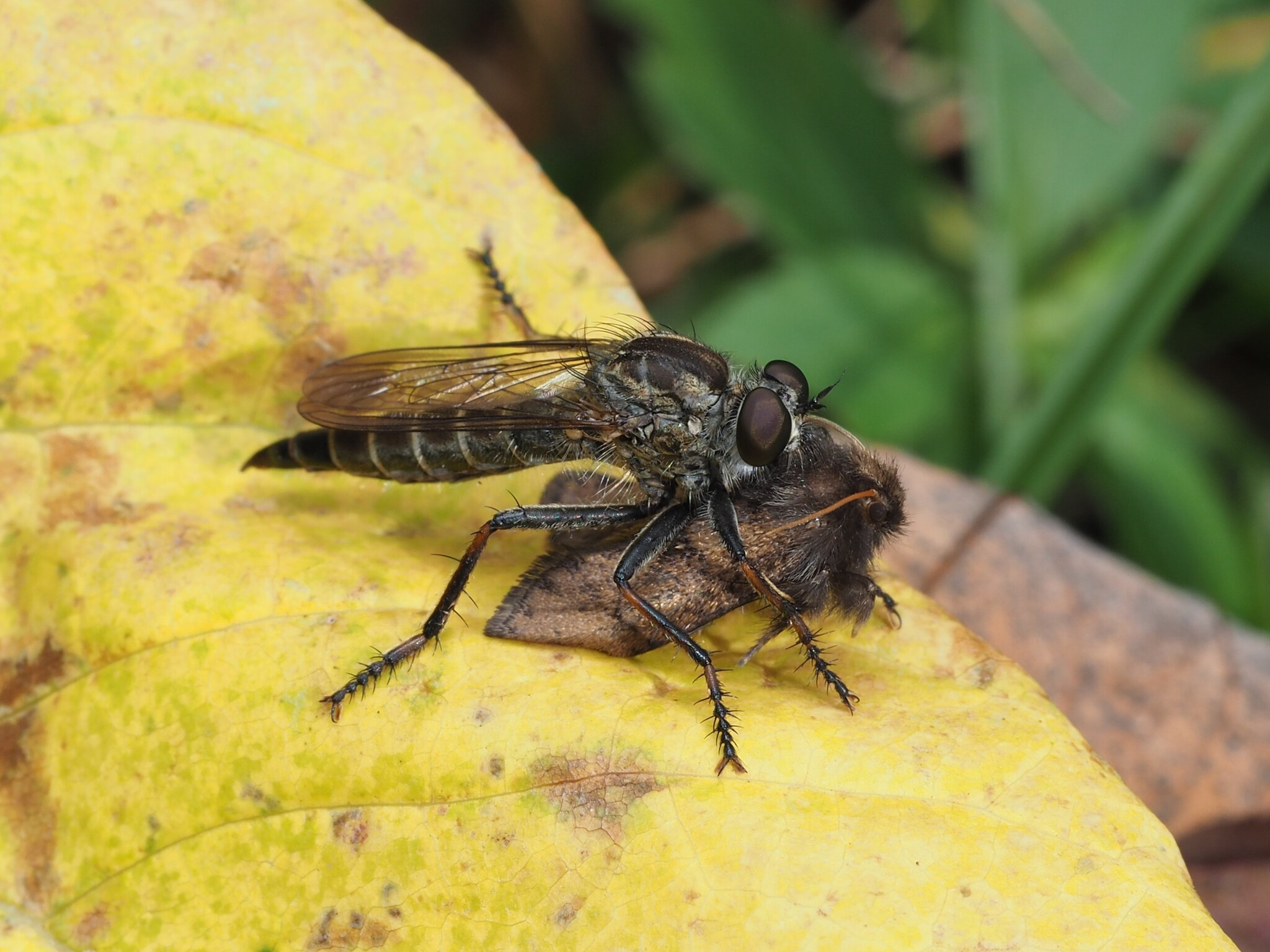

Scientific classification
- Kingdom: Animalia
- Phylum: Arthropoda
- Class: Insecta
- Order: Diptera
- Family: Asilidae
- Genus: Machimus
- Species: M. sadyates

Binomial name
- Machimus sadyates (Walker, 1849)

Synonyms
- Asilus avidus Wulp, 1869; Asilus sadyates Walker, 1849; Asilus tibialis Macquart, 1834

= Machimus sadyates =

Species of fly

Machimus sadyates is a species of robber fly in the family Asilidae.
