= Machimus antimachus =

Scientific classification
- Kingdom: Animalia
- Phylum: Arthropoda
- Class: Insecta
- Order: Diptera
- Family: Asilidae
- Genus: Machimus
- Species: M. antimachus

Binomial name
- Machimus antimachus (Walker, 1849)

Synonyms
- Asilus antimachus Walker, 1849

Species of fly

Machimus antimachus is a species of robber flies in the family Asilidae.
