= Microstylum galactodes =

Scientific classification
- Domain: Eukaryota
- Kingdom: Animalia
- Phylum: Arthropoda
- Class: Insecta
- Order: Diptera
- Family: Asilidae
- Genus: Microstylum
- Species: M. galactodes

Binomial name
- Microstylum galactodes Loew, 1866

Species of fly

Microstylum galactodes is a species of robber flies in the family Asilidae.
