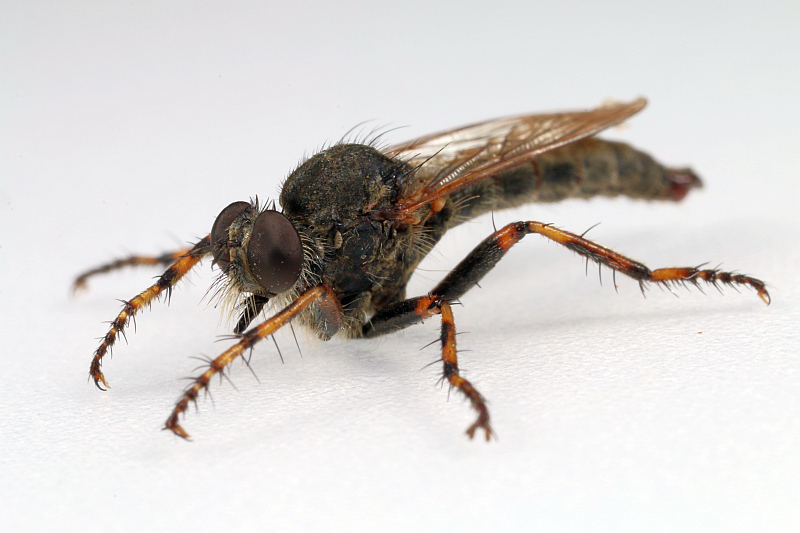
- Machimus cingulatus, Culemborg, the Netherlands

Scientific classification
- Kingdom: Animalia
- Phylum: Arthropoda
- Clade: Pancrustacea
- Class: Insecta
- Order: Diptera
- Family: Asilidae
- Genus: Machimus
- Species: M. cingulatus

Binomial name
- Machimus cingulatus (Fabricius, 1781)

Synonyms
- Tolmerus cingulatus (Fabricius, 1781); Asilus cingulatus Fabricius, 1781

= Machimus cingulatus =

Species of fly

Machimus cingulatus is a Palearctic species of robber fly in the family Asilidae.

== Identification ==
It is a small, grey-black asilid (10-15 mm.) Difficult to distinguish from other Machimus. Wolff, Gebel and Geller-Grimm (2021), ( Majer (1997), van den Broek (1979), Stubbs and Falk (2001) all provide keys, descriptions and illustrations. Older works are also useful eg. Seguy (1920)
