= Machimus adustus =

Scientific classification
- Domain: Eukaryota
- Kingdom: Animalia
- Phylum: Arthropoda
- Class: Insecta
- Order: Diptera
- Family: Asilidae
- Genus: Machimus
- Species: M. adustus

Binomial name
- Machimus adustus Martin, 1975

Species of fly

Machimus adustus is a species of robber flies in the family Asilidae.
