= Earthworm Society of Britain =

The Earthworm Society of Britain aims to promote and support scientific research so that earthworms and their environment can be better understood. Through its work the society aims to encourage the conservation of earthworms and their habitats and to educate and inspire people so that these creatures may continue to be enjoyed in the future. The Society was founded in 2009.

The society hosts the National Earthworm Recording Scheme and collates biological records of earthworm species occurrences from amateur naturalists and earthworm research organisations.
