= Megaphorus minutus =

Scientific classification
- Domain: Eukaryota
- Kingdom: Animalia
- Phylum: Arthropoda
- Class: Insecta
- Order: Diptera
- Family: Asilidae
- Genus: Megaphorus
- Species: M. minutus

Binomial name
- Megaphorus minutus (Macquart, 1834)

Synonyms
- Mallophora minuta Macquart, 1834

Species of fly

Megaphorus minutus is a species of robber flies in the family Asilidae.
