= Metapogon punctipennis =

Scientific classification
- Domain: Eukaryota
- Kingdom: Animalia
- Phylum: Arthropoda
- Class: Insecta
- Order: Diptera
- Family: Asilidae
- Genus: Metapogon
- Species: M. punctipennis

Binomial name
- Metapogon punctipennis Coquillett, 1904

Species of fly

Metapogon punctipennis is a species of robber flies in the family Asilidae.
