= British Soldierflies and Their Allies =

2001 book by Alan E. Stubbs and Martin Drake

- The cover of the first edition
- Author: Alan E. Stubbs, Martin Drake
- Illustrator: David Wilson
- Language: English
- Publisher: British Entomological and Natural History Society
- Publication date: 2001
- Publication place: U.K.
- Media type: Print (Hardback)
- Pages: 528
- ISBN: 978-1899935048

British Soldierflies and their allies (an illustrated guide to their identification and ecology) is a book by Alan E. Stubbs and Martin Drake, published by the British Entomological and Natural History Society in 2001. A second edition was published in 2014.

It is a sequel to an earlier volume, British Hoverflies: an identification guide, and covers the following families of flies, which collectively are known as the "Larger Brachycera": Acroceridae, Asilidae, Athericidae, Bombyliidae, Rhagionidae, Scenopinidae, Stratiomyidae, Tabanidae, Therevidae, Xylomyidae and Xylophagidae.

The book introduced English names for all included species, the first time this has been done in a scientific reference work for a whole group of flies.

It contains a set of photographic plates by David Wilson.

== See also ==
- List of soldierflies and allies of Great Britain
