= Megaphorus willistoni =

Scientific classification
- Domain: Eukaryota
- Kingdom: Animalia
- Phylum: Arthropoda
- Class: Insecta
- Order: Diptera
- Family: Asilidae
- Genus: Megaphorus
- Species: M. willistoni

Binomial name
- Megaphorus willistoni (Cole, 1964)

Synonyms
- Mallophorina willistoni Cole, 1964

Species of fly

Megaphorus willistoni is a species of robber flies in the family Asilidae. It feeds on a variety of prey, primarily Hymenoptera. It often attacks prey from above, puncturing the compound eyes.
