= Megaphorus prudens =

Scientific classification
- Domain: Eukaryota
- Kingdom: Animalia
- Phylum: Arthropoda
- Class: Insecta
- Order: Diptera
- Family: Asilidae
- Genus: Megaphorus
- Species: M. prudens

Binomial name
- Megaphorus prudens (Pritchard, 1935)

Synonyms
- Mallophorina prudens Pritchard, 1935

Species of fly

Megaphorus prudens is a species of robber flies in the family Asilidae.
