= Machimus virginicus =

Scientific classification
- Domain: Eukaryota
- Kingdom: Animalia
- Phylum: Arthropoda
- Class: Insecta
- Order: Diptera
- Family: Asilidae
- Genus: Machimus
- Species: M. virginicus

Binomial name
- Machimus virginicus (Banks, 1920)

Synonyms
- Asilus virginicus Banks, 1920

Species of fly

Machimus virginicus is a species of robber flies in the family Asilidae.
