= Machimus elegans =

Scientific classification
- Domain: Eukaryota
- Kingdom: Animalia
- Phylum: Arthropoda
- Class: Insecta
- Order: Diptera
- Family: Asilidae
- Genus: Machimus
- Species: M. elegans

Binomial name
- Machimus elegans (Loew 1849)

Synonyms
- Asilus elegans Loew, 1849

Species of fly

Machimus elegans is a species of fly in the family Asilidae, the robber flies and assassin flies. It is found in the Near East.
