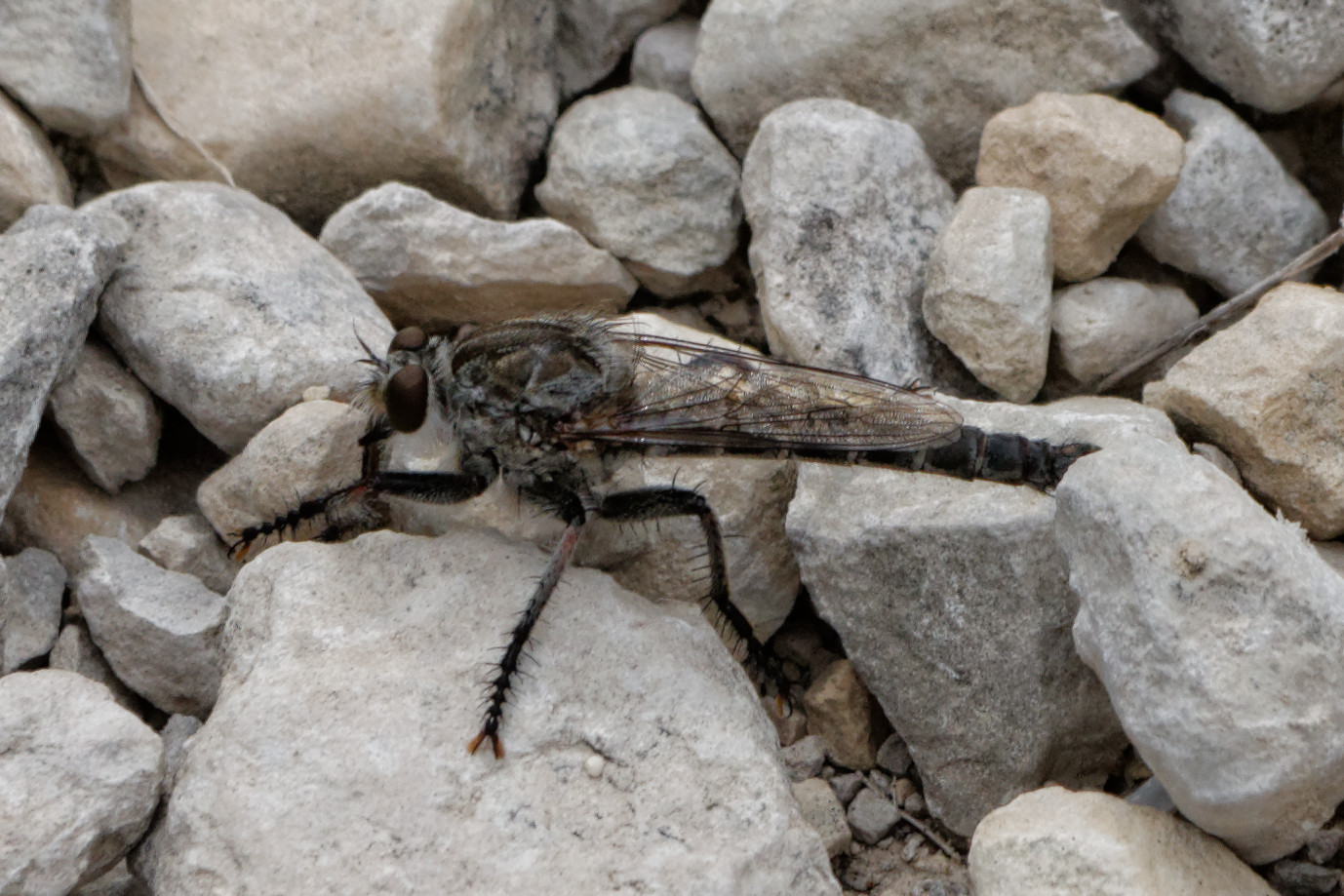
- Machimus rusticus France

Scientific classification
- Kingdom: Animalia
- Phylum: Arthropoda
- Clade: Pancrustacea
- Class: Insecta
- Order: Diptera
- Family: Asilidae
- Genus: Machimus
- Species: M. rusticus

Binomial name
- Machimus rusticus (Meigen, 1820)

= Machimus rusticus =

Species of fly

Machimus rusticus is a Palearctic species of robber fly in the family Asilidae.

== Identification ==
It is a small, grey-black asilid (10-15 mm.) Difficult to distinguish from other Machimus. Wolff, Gebel and Geller-Grimm (2021), (Majer (1997), van den Broek (1979), Stubbs and Drake (2001) all provide keys, descriptions and illustrations. Older works are also useful eg. Seguy (1920)
