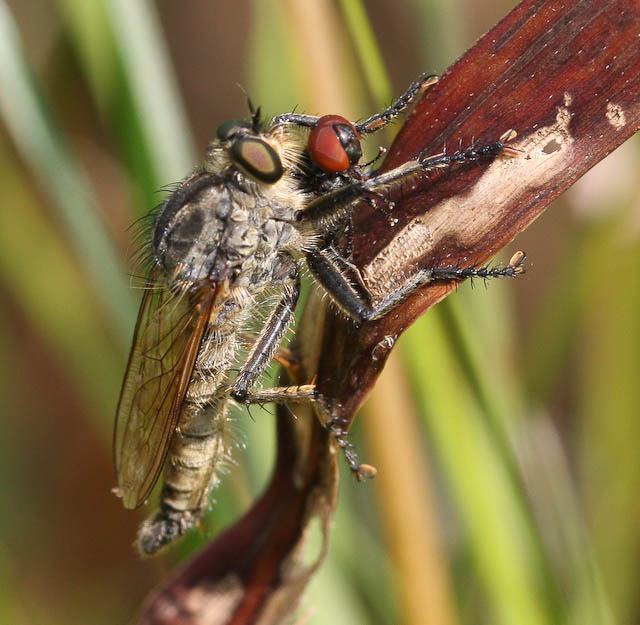
- D. trigonus with prey

Scientific classification
- Kingdom: Animalia
- Phylum: Arthropoda
- Clade: Pancrustacea
- Class: Insecta
- Order: Diptera
- Family: Asilidae
- Genus: Dysmachus; Loew, 1860

= Dysmachus =

Genus of insects

Dysmachus is a genus of flies belonging to the family Asilidae.

The species of this genus are found in Europe.

== Some species ==
Species:

- Dysmachus albiseta Becker, 1907
- Dysmachus albisetosus (Macquart, 1849)
- Dysmachus albovestitus Villeneuve, 1930
- Dysmachus fuscipennis Meigen, 1820
- Dysmachus trigonus Meigen, 1804
