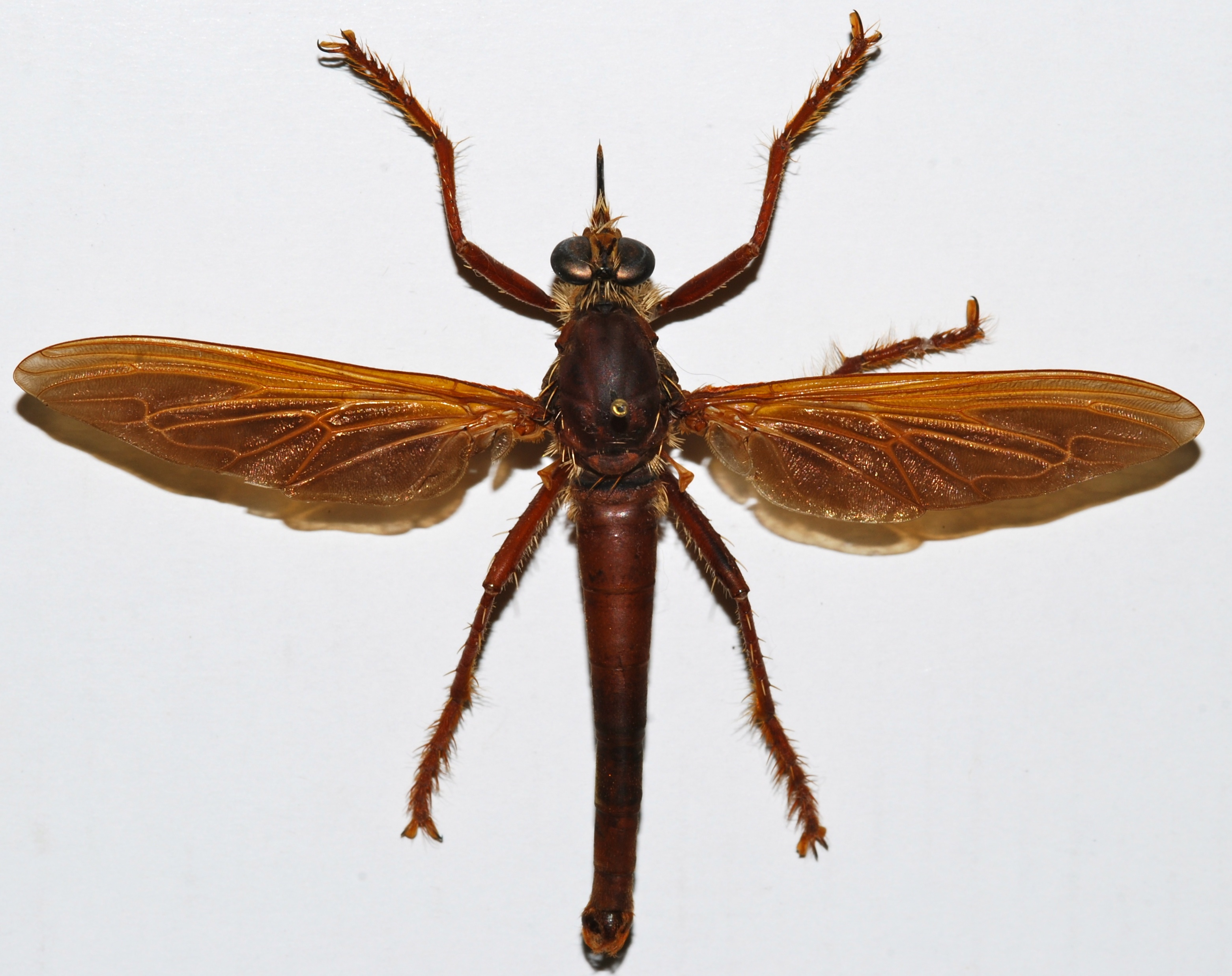

Scientific classification
- Domain: Eukaryota
- Kingdom: Animalia
- Phylum: Arthropoda
- Class: Insecta
- Order: Diptera
- Family: Asilidae
- Subfamily: Stenopogoninae
- Genus: Microstylum; Macquart, 1838

Diversity
- at least 140 species

= Microstylum =

Genus of flies

Microstylum is a genus of robber flies in the family Asilidae. There are at least 130 described species in Microstylum.

== See also ==
- List of Microstylum species
