= Checklist (disambiguation) =

A checklist is a type of job aid used to reduce failure by compensating for potential limits of human memory and attention.

Checklist or check list may also refer to:

- Check List, a peer-reviewed, open access, online, scientific journal
- "Checklist", a 2019 song by MAX from the album Colour Vision
- "Checklist", a 2018 song by Normani and Calvin Harris from the EP Normani x Calvin Harris
- Check sheet, a form used to collect data in real time at the location where the data is generated

== See also ==
- Check (disambiguation)
- List (disambiguation)
- Chequebook, or checkbook, a book of cheques and ledger list for those cheques
- Laundry list (disambiguation)
- Shopping list
- To-do list
- Category:Checklists
