= Probaenia bicoloricornis =

Scientific classification
- Kingdom: Animalia
- Phylum: Arthropoda
- Clade: Pancrustacea
- Class: Insecta
- Order: Coleoptera
- Suborder: Polyphaga
- Infraorder: Cucujiformia
- Family: Chrysomelidae
- Genus: Probaenia
- Species: P. bicoloricornis

Binomial name
- Probaenia bicoloricornis Pic, 1927

Species of beetle

Probaenia bicoloricornis is a species of beetle of the family Chrysomelidae. It is found in Brazil (Goiás).

== Description ==
Adults reach a length of about 5 mm. Adults are very similar to Probaenia germaini, but the head is lined with dark behind the eyes, the prothorax has two metallic discal bands, and the green colouration is more extensive on the middle of the elytra.

== Biology ==
The food plant is unknown.
