= Scelophysa pruinosa =

Scientific classification
- Kingdom: Animalia
- Phylum: Arthropoda
- Class: Insecta
- Order: Coleoptera
- Suborder: Polyphaga
- Infraorder: Scarabaeiformia
- Family: Scarabaeidae
- Genus: Scelophysa
- Species: S. pruinosa

Binomial name
- Scelophysa pruinosa Burmeister, 1844

Species of beetle

Scelophysa pruinosa is a species of beetle of the family Scarabaeidae. It is found in South Africa (Northern Cape).

== Description ==
Adults reach a length of about 9–10 mm (0.35–0.39 in). Males are very similar to Scelophysa trimeni, but the disposition of the blue scales on the elytra is different. These scales are dense only along the outer margins and the suture, and along the base. The whole discoidal part is also covered with scales similar to the others in shape, but opaline, and giving to the background, which is light testaceous, a lilac tinge. The whole surface is briefly but densely setulose. Females are also similar to those of S. trimeni, but are completely covered on the upper part with greenish-yellow scales, turning to uniform yellow on the pygidium and along the upper part of the abdominal segments. The scales on the lower part are silvery.
