= DEZ =

DEZ refers to:

- Deir ez-Zor Airport, airport code
- Deutsche Entomologische Zeitschrift, a peer-reviewed open access scientific journal
- diethylzinc, a reagent in chemistry
