= Probaenia nobilis =

Scientific classification
- Kingdom: Animalia
- Phylum: Arthropoda
- Class: Insecta
- Order: Coleoptera
- Suborder: Polyphaga
- Infraorder: Cucujiformia
- Family: Chrysomelidae
- Genus: Probaenia
- Species: P. nobilis

Binomial name
- Probaenia nobilis (Chapuis, 1877)

Synonyms
- Uroplata (Uroplata) nobilis Chapuis, 1877

Species of beetle

Probaenia nobilis is a species of beetle of the family Chrysomelidae. It is found in Brazil (Bahia, Rio de Janeiro, São Paulo).

== Description ==
Adults are similar to Probaenia tessellata, but broader in build, and much more expanded at the posterior outer angle of the elytra.

== Biology ==
The food plant is unknown.
