= Hiromi Suzuki =

Hiromi Suzuki may refer to:

- Hiromi Suzuki (illustrator) (鈴木 博美), Japanese illustrator
- Hiromi Suzuki (runner) (鈴木 博美, born 1968), Japanese long-distance runner
- Hiromi Suzuki (volleyball) (鈴木 洋美, born 1978), Japanese volleyball player
