= Probaenia tibialis =

Scientific classification
- Kingdom: Animalia
- Phylum: Arthropoda
- Class: Insecta
- Order: Coleoptera
- Suborder: Polyphaga
- Infraorder: Cucujiformia
- Family: Chrysomelidae
- Genus: Probaenia
- Species: P. tibialis

Binomial name
- Probaenia tibialis (Kolbe, 1901)

Synonyms
- Uroplata tibialis Kolbe, 1901; Probaenia triquetra Uhmann, 1940

Species of beetle

Probaenia tibialis is a species of beetle of the family Chrysomelidae. It is found in Colombia.

== Taxonomy ==
Although described in 1901, this description was placed in the wrong chapter of an article in the Berliner Entomologische Zeitschrift. This is the reason that Julius Weise overlooked the species description when he prepared the Hispinae part of the Coleopterorum Catalogus in 1911. Uhmann later published a supplement to this catalogue in 1957, but also overlooked the species. Later, Uhmann described the species himself, under the name Probaenia triquetra.

== Biology ==
The food plant is unknown.
