= Scelophysa capensis =

Scientific classification
- Kingdom: Animalia
- Phylum: Arthropoda
- Clade: Pancrustacea
- Class: Insecta
- Order: Coleoptera
- Suborder: Polyphaga
- Infraorder: Scarabaeiformia
- Family: Scarabaeidae
- Genus: Scelophysa
- Species: S. capensis

Binomial name
- Scelophysa capensis Dombrow, 1999

Species of beetle

Scelophysa capensis is a species of beetle of the family Scarabaeidae. It is found in South Africa (Western Cape).
