= Probaenia =

Scientific classification
- Kingdom: Animalia
- Phylum: Arthropoda
- Clade: Pancrustacea
- Class: Insecta
- Order: Coleoptera
- Suborder: Polyphaga
- Infraorder: Cucujiformia
- Family: Chrysomelidae
- Subfamily: Cassidinae
- Tribe: Chalepini
- Genus: Probaenia; Weise, 1904

Genus of leaf beetles

Probaenia is a genus of beetles belonging to the family Chrysomelidae.

== Species ==
- Probaenia armigera (Baly, 1885)
- Probaenia baeri Pic, 1927
- Probaenia bicoloricornis Pic, 1927
- Probaenia bicoloripes Pic, 1927
- Probaenia boliviana Pic, 1927
- Probaenia brevevittata Pic, 1933
- Probaenia clara Weise, 1905
- Probaenia clermonti Pic, 1933
- Probaenia crenata (Blanchard, 1843)
- Probaenia crenatula Uhmann, 1928
- Probaenia decipiens (Chapuis, 1877)
- Probaenia donckieri Pic, 1927
- Probaenia fasciata Weise, 1906
- Probaenia forsteri Uhmann, 1957
- Probaenia germaini Pic, 1927
- Probaenia grayi (Baly, 1865)
- Probaenia iheringi Weise, 1910
- Probaenia latefasciata Pic, 1927
- Probaenia luteonotata Pic, 1927
- Probaenia maculaticeps Pic, 1927
- Probaenia major Pic, 1927
- Probaenia militaris (Baly, 1864)
- Probaenia nigritarsis Weise, 1905
- Probaenia nobilis (Chapuis, 1877)
- Probaenia pallidior Pic, 1927
- Probaenia pici Uhmann, 1930
- Probaenia pretiosa Uhmann, 1927 (the distribution of this species is unknown)
- Probaenia purpureotincta Pic, 1927
- Probaenia quadrivittata Pic, 1927
- Probaenia robusta Weise, 1910
- Probaenia ruficeps Pic, 1927
- Probaenia ruficornis Pic, 1937
- Probaenia sinuata Pic, 1927
- Probaenia tessellata Weise, 1905
- Probaenia tibialis (Kolbe, 1901)
- Probaenia tibiella Weise, 1905
- Probaenia tricolor Pic, 1927
- Probaenia variegata (Baly, 1885)
- Probaenia variolaris Weise, 1905
- Probaenia venusta (Chapuis, 1877)
- Probaenia viridiceps Pic, 1927
- Probaenia viridinotata Pic, 1927
- Probaenia vittulosa Weise, 1905
- Probaenia weisei Uhmann, 1927
