= Probaenia major =

Scientific classification
- Kingdom: Animalia
- Phylum: Arthropoda
- Class: Insecta
- Order: Coleoptera
- Suborder: Polyphaga
- Infraorder: Cucujiformia
- Family: Chrysomelidae
- Genus: Probaenia
- Species: P. major

Binomial name
- Probaenia major Pic, 1927

Species of beetle

Probaenia major is a species of beetle of the family Chrysomelidae. It is found in Brazil.

== Description ==
Adults reach a length of about 10 mm. Adults are shiny reddish, the elytron is testaceous, with green spots at the scutellum and with blackish-green and green bands.

== Biology ==
The food plant is unknown.
