= Probaenia baeri =

Scientific classification
- Kingdom: Animalia
- Phylum: Arthropoda
- Clade: Pancrustacea
- Class: Insecta
- Order: Coleoptera
- Suborder: Polyphaga
- Infraorder: Cucujiformia
- Family: Chrysomelidae
- Genus: Probaenia
- Species: P. baeri

Binomial name
- Probaenia baeri Pic, 1927

Species of beetle

Probaenia baeri is a species of beetle of the family Chrysomelidae. It is found in Peru.

== Description ==
Adults reach a length of about 7 mm. Adults are shiny black, with metallic black thorax. The elytron has a sinuous sutural band and a shorter subarcuate lateral band, as well as a transverse ante-apical band and apical band.

== Biology ==
The food plant is unknown.
