= Probaenia maculaticeps =

Scientific classification
- Kingdom: Animalia
- Phylum: Arthropoda
- Class: Insecta
- Order: Coleoptera
- Suborder: Polyphaga
- Infraorder: Cucujiformia
- Family: Chrysomelidae
- Genus: Probaenia
- Species: P. maculaticeps

Binomial name
- Probaenia maculaticeps Pic, 1927

Species of beetle

Probaenia maculaticeps is a species of beetle of the family Chrysomelidae. It is found in Ecuador.

== Description ==
Adults reach a length of about 7 mm. Adults are shining red, the head posteriorly minutely marked with black, while the antennae and three bands on the thorax are black. The elytron is rufous, with four blackish-blue bands.

== Biology ==
The food plant is unknown.
