= Probaenia iheringi =

Scientific classification
- Kingdom: Animalia
- Phylum: Arthropoda
- Clade: Pancrustacea
- Class: Insecta
- Order: Coleoptera
- Suborder: Polyphaga
- Infraorder: Cucujiformia
- Family: Chrysomelidae
- Genus: Probaenia
- Species: P. iheringi

Binomial name
- Probaenia iheringi Weise, 1910

Species of beetle

Probaenia iheringi is a species of beetle of the family Chrysomelidae. It is found in Brazil (Amazonas, Pernambuco).

== Description ==
Adults reach a length of about 6-6.5 mm. Adults are yellow, with the head and antennae black. The posterior angle of the elytra is laterally produced into a sharp tooth and there is a small spot near the scutellum, as well as an apical and lateral band (which is interrupted at the middle) and two bands (anterior and posterior) which are bronze- or bluish-black.

== Biology ==
The food plant is unknown.
