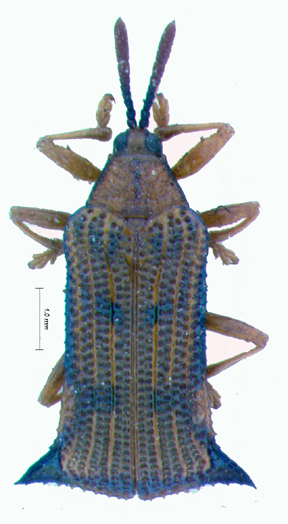

Scientific classification
- Kingdom: Animalia
- Phylum: Arthropoda
- Clade: Pancrustacea
- Class: Insecta
- Order: Coleoptera
- Suborder: Polyphaga
- Infraorder: Cucujiformia
- Family: Chrysomelidae
- Genus: Probaenia
- Species: P. clara

Binomial name
- Probaenia clara Weise, 1905

= Probaenia clara =

Species of beetle

Probaenia clara is a species of beetle of the family Chrysomelidae. It is found in Brazil (Goiás) and Paraguay.

== Description ==
Adults reach a length of about 5.5-6.2 mm. Adults are brownish-red, while the antennae are black with red tips.

== Biology ==
The food plant is unknown.
