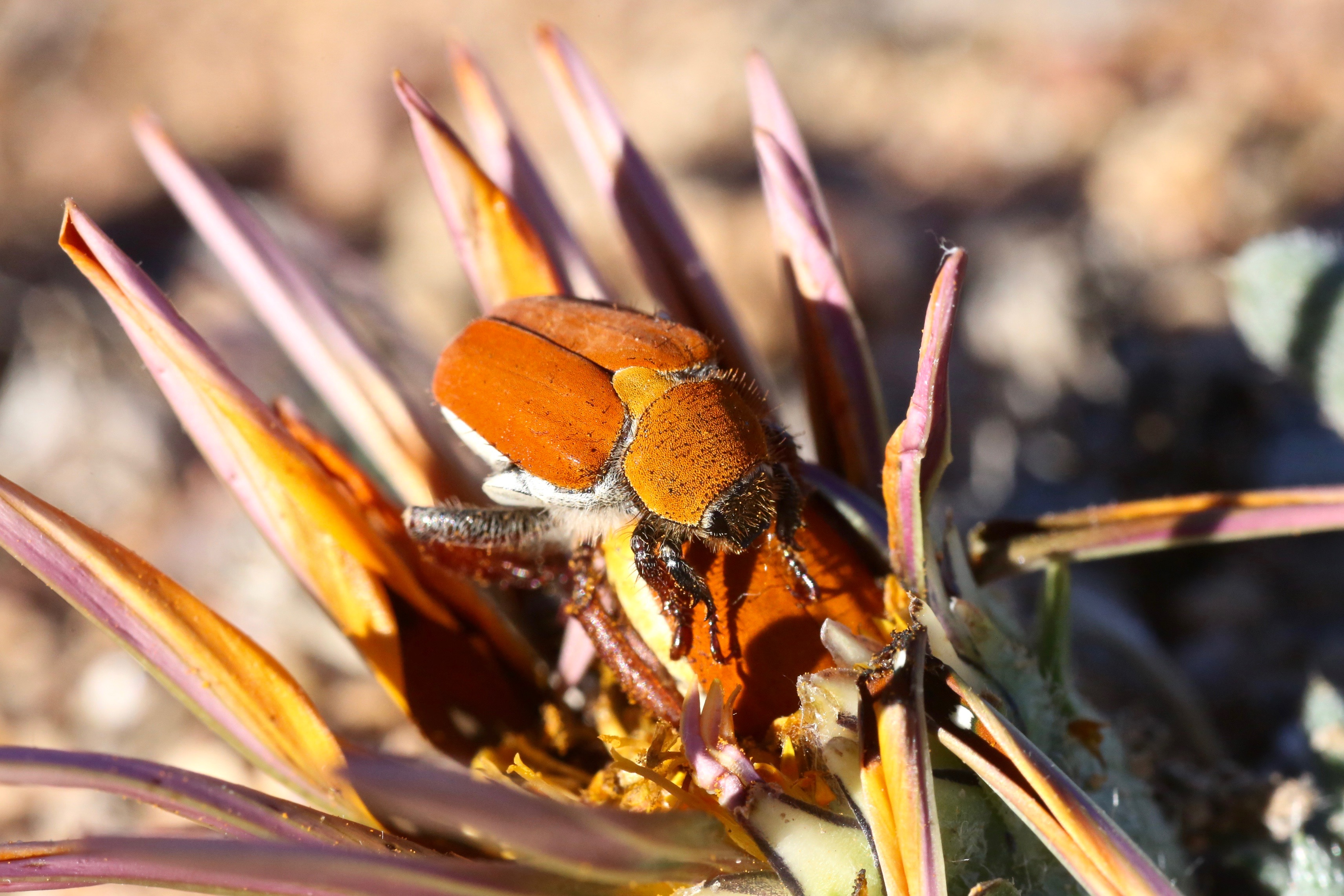

Scientific classification
- Kingdom: Animalia
- Phylum: Arthropoda
- Class: Insecta
- Order: Coleoptera
- Suborder: Polyphaga
- Infraorder: Scarabaeiformia
- Family: Scarabaeidae
- Genus: Scelophysa
- Species: S. militaris

Binomial name
- Scelophysa militaris (Gyllenhal, 1817)

Synonyms
- Melolontha militaris Gyllenhal, 1817

= Scelophysa militaris =

Species of beetle

Scelophysa militaris is a species of beetle of the family Scarabaeidae. It is found in South Africa (Northern Cape, Western Cape).

== Description ==
Adults reach a length of about 10–12 mm (0.39–0.47 in). Males are entirely covered on the upper side with minute contiguous scales varying in colour from light bright yellow to orange and ochreous, the pygidial part and the abdomen are covered with similar but flavescent scales, the clypeus, however, is without any, and the pectus is villose. The antennae are fuscous, and the legs are red and slightly pubescent, deeply punctured, with the punctures squamose. Females are similar to males, but the scales on the pygidium are nearly always more flavescent than in males.
