= Probaenia sinuata =

Scientific classification
- Kingdom: Animalia
- Phylum: Arthropoda
- Class: Insecta
- Order: Coleoptera
- Suborder: Polyphaga
- Infraorder: Cucujiformia
- Family: Chrysomelidae
- Genus: Probaenia
- Species: P. sinuata

Binomial name
- Probaenia sinuata Pic, 1927

Species of beetle

Probaenia sinuata is a species of beetle of the family Chrysomelidae. It is found in Colombia.

== Description ==
Adults reach a length of about 5 mm. Adults are shiny black. The elytron is green, with many markings.

== Biology ==
The food plant is unknown.
