= Probaenia ruficornis =

Scientific classification
- Kingdom: Animalia
- Phylum: Arthropoda
- Class: Insecta
- Order: Coleoptera
- Suborder: Polyphaga
- Infraorder: Cucujiformia
- Family: Chrysomelidae
- Genus: Probaenia
- Species: P. ruficornis

Binomial name
- Probaenia ruficornis Pic, 1937

Species of beetle

Probaenia ruficornis is a species of beetle of the family Chrysomelidae. It is found in Brazil.

== Biology ==
The food plant is unknown.
