= Probaenia brevevittata =

Scientific classification
- Kingdom: Animalia
- Phylum: Arthropoda
- Clade: Pancrustacea
- Class: Insecta
- Order: Coleoptera
- Suborder: Polyphaga
- Infraorder: Cucujiformia
- Family: Chrysomelidae
- Genus: Probaenia
- Species: P. brevevittata

Binomial name
- Probaenia brevevittata Pic, 1933

Species of beetle

Probaenia brevevittata is a species of beetle of the family Chrysomelidae. It is found in Bolivia and Brazil.

== Description ==
Adults reach a length of about 8 mm. Adults are red, the elytra with three transverse purple bands.

== Biology ==
The food plant is unknown.
