= Zoologia =

- Discipline: Taxonomy, evolution, biogeography
- Language: English

Publication details
- History: 1982–present
- Publisher: Pensoft Publishers
- Frequency: Bimonthly
- Open access: Yes
- License: CC BY 4.0
- Impact factor: 2.1 (2025)

Standard abbreviations
- ISO 4: Zoologia

Indexing
- ISSN: 1984-4670 (print); 1984-4689 (web)
- OCLC no.: 818994325

Links
- Journal homepage

Zoologia is a peer-reviewed open access scientific journal covering zoological taxonomy, phylogeny, biogeography and more. It was established in 1982 by the Sociedade Brasileira de Zoologia. It is published by Pensoft Publishers. It was formerly called Revista Brasileira de Zoologia but changed its name to Zoologia in 2009.
