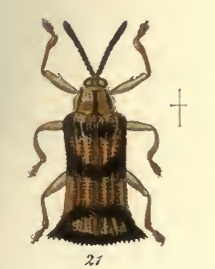

Scientific classification
- Kingdom: Animalia
- Phylum: Arthropoda
- Class: Insecta
- Order: Coleoptera
- Suborder: Polyphaga
- Infraorder: Cucujiformia
- Family: Chrysomelidae
- Genus: Probaenia
- Species: P. variegata

Binomial name
- Probaenia variegata (Baly, 1885)

Synonyms
- Uroplata variegata Baly, 1885

= Probaenia variegata =

Species of beetle

Probaenia variegata is a species of beetle of the family Chrysomelidae. It is found in Panama.

== Description ==
The head is subopaque, with the vertex longitudinally excavated and stained with blackish-piceous. The interocular space is moderately produced and angulate. The antennae are black, more than a third the length of the body and thickened towards the apex, with cylindrical joints. The thorax is transverse, the sides converging from the base to the apex, obtusely rounded, the anterior angle produced into an obtuse tooth. The upper surface is transversely convex, the hinder disc transversely depressed, coarsely and closely punctured. The disc has three black vittae, extending from the base to the apex. The elytra is broader than the thorax, with the sides parallel, rather quickly dilated at the hinder angle. It is serrulate and the posterior angle is dilated laterally into an acute triangular plate. The apex is obtusely rounded and the apical margin, together with the hinder margin of the dilated posterior angle, is more strongly serrulate than the sides. Each elytron has ten, at the extreme base eleven, rows of large deeply impressed punctures. The second, fourth, and eighth interspaces, together with the base and apex of the sixth, are costate and aeneous, variegated with fulvous markings, which form an irregular semicircular band extending from the middle of the basal margin to the suture just before its middle. There is an irregular fascia just below the middle of the elytron, and a transverse patch or fascia immediately above the apex.

== Biology ==
The food plant is unknown.
