= Probaenia boliviana =

Scientific classification
- Kingdom: Animalia
- Phylum: Arthropoda
- Clade: Pancrustacea
- Class: Insecta
- Order: Coleoptera
- Suborder: Polyphaga
- Infraorder: Cucujiformia
- Family: Chrysomelidae
- Genus: Probaenia
- Species: P. boliviana

Binomial name
- Probaenia boliviana Pic, 1927

Species of beetle

Probaenia boliviana is a species of beetle of the family Chrysomelidae. It is found in Bolivia.

== Description ==
Adults reach a length of about 8 mm. Adults are reddish-brown, with the thorax laterally and in the middle greenish-yellow. The elytron has green margins and greenish markings.

== Biology ==
The food plant is unknown.
