= Probaenia crenatula =

Scientific classification
- Kingdom: Animalia
- Phylum: Arthropoda
- Class: Insecta
- Order: Coleoptera
- Suborder: Polyphaga
- Infraorder: Cucujiformia
- Family: Chrysomelidae
- Genus: Probaenia
- Species: P. crenatula

Binomial name
- Probaenia crenatula Uhmann, 1928

Species of beetle

Probaenia crenatula is a species of beetle of the family Chrysomelidae. It is found in Costa Rica.

== Description ==
Adults reach a length of about 7 mm. Adults are black, with the prothorax yellow-testaceous with three black bands. The elytra has four yellow-testaceous bands and black markings.

== Biology ==
The food plant is unknown.
