= Hiromi Suzuki (illustrator) =

Japanese illustrator and poet

- 鈴木 博美
- Born: Tokorozawa, Saitama Prefecture, Japan
- Occupations: Poet, artist, writer
- Years active: 1989 -

Hiromi Suzuki (鈴木 博美, Suzuki Hiromi) is a Japanese illustrator, poet, and fiction writer.

== Life ==
Suzuki was born in Tokorozawa, Saitama Prefecture, Japan.

She studied literature and worked at a life insurance company before entering the prestigious art school Setsu Mode Seminar, which closed in 2017. The school was founded by the influential fashion illustrator and artist Setsu Nagasawa, whom she credits with teaching her about the concepts of "freedom" and "elegance" in art. After graduating, Suzuki became a freelance illustrator. In 1989, she established Orange Peel Inc.

She has produced work for magazines, newspapers, and for advertising and has utilized screen-printing, collaging, and GIF-collaging in her art.

Suzuki is currently based in Tokyo, Japan.

== Works ==
=== Poetry ===
Suzuki's poetry, stories, and art have been published in international journals and magazines.

Her blog, Microjournal, was featured in the monthly magazine Sosho by freelance writer and book critic Takeshi Okazaki. She also writes poetry, and from 1999, her poetry was published in Eureka magazine for one year under the selection of Yasuo Irisawa.

She was a member of the Japanese poetry magazine “gui” (run by members of the Japanese “VOU” group of poets, founded by the late Katue Kitasono, alongside poets like Setsuko Tsuji and Fumiko Hibino).

- Ms. cried – 77 poems by hiromi suzuki (Kisaragi Publishing, 2013)
- logbook (Hesterglock Press, 2018)
- INVISIBLE SCENERY (Low Frequency Press, 2018)
- Andante (AngelHousePress, 2019)
- Found Words from Olivetti (Simulacrum Press, 2020)
- Ephemera (Colossive Press, 2021)
- Isolated Life (psw gallery, 2023)

Her works are published internationally in Otoliths, BlazeVOX, Empty Mirror, Experiment-O, M58, DATABLEED, Black Market Re-View, Burning House Press, h&, BRAVE NEW WORD magazine, DODGING THE RAIN, Jazz Cigarette, and TAPE HISS zine, amongst other places.

=== Short stories ===
Suzuki's short stories have been published in numerous magazines and literary journals, including 3:AM Magazine, RIC journal, Berfrois, and Minor Literature[s].

- In June 2023, Suzuki's short story, Lycoris Radiata, was published by IceFloe Press through the Subterranean Chatter Project

=== Appearances ===
- In September 2021, Suzuki held a double solo exhibition with Francesco Thérèse in Rome

== Nominations ==
She was nominated for Lürzer's Archive 200 Best Illustrators worldwide in 2006.
