= Probaenia robusta =

Scientific classification
- Kingdom: Animalia
- Phylum: Arthropoda
- Class: Insecta
- Order: Coleoptera
- Suborder: Polyphaga
- Infraorder: Cucujiformia
- Family: Chrysomelidae
- Genus: Probaenia
- Species: P. robusta

Binomial name
- Probaenia robusta Weise, 1910

Species of beetle

Probaenia robusta is a species of beetle of the family Chrysomelidae. It is found in Bolivia.

== Description ==
Adults reach a length of about 8 mm. Adults are yellow, the antennae and three bands on the prothorax are black. The posterior angle of the elytra is laterally produced into a sharp tooth. The dorsum is strongly striated, punctate, with a scutellar spot and two posteriorly shortened bands, the band in front of the apex is bluish-bronze, while the apical band is black.

== Biology ==
The food plant is unknown.
