= Zoosystematics and Evolution =

- Discipline: Systematics
- Language: English
- Edited by: Thomas von Rintelen

Publication details
- Former name: Mitteilungen aus der Zoologischen Sammlung des Museums für Naturkunde in Berlin
- History: 1898–present
- Publisher: Wiley-VCH 1898-2013, Pensoft Publishers 2014-present on behalf of the Museum für Naturkunde
- Frequency: Upon acceptance
- Open access: Yes
- Impact factor: 1.4 (2025)

Standard abbreviations
- ISO 4: Zoosyst. Evol.

Indexing
- ISSN: 1435-1935 (print); 1860-0743 (web)
- LCCN: 2010295411
- OCLC no.: 256010449

Links
- Journal homepage; Online archive (2014-present); Online archive (1898-2013)

Zoosystematics and Evolution is a peer-reviewed open access scientific journal covering zoological systematics and evolution. It was established in 1898 as Mitteilungen aus der Zoologischen Sammlung des Museums für Naturkunde in Berlin (German for 'Communications from the Zoological Collection of the Natural History Museum, Berlin') and obtained its current title in 2008. The journal was established in 1898 and is published by Pensoft Publishers on behalf of the Museum für Naturkunde. The editor-in-chief is Thomas von Rintelen.

== Abstracting and indexing ==
Journal's 2025 Scopus CiteScore is 1.8.

The journal is abstracted and indexed in

- Biological Abstracts
- BIOSIS Previews
- Cambridge Scientific Abstracts
- Current Contents/Agriculture, Biology & Environmental Sciences
- Science Citation Index Expanded
- Scopus
- The Zoological Record
