= Metabarcoding & Metagenomics =

- Discipline: Scientific
- Language: English
- Edited by: Florian Leese

Publication details
- History: 2017
- Publisher: Pensoft Publishers
- Frequency: continuous
- Open access: Yes
- License: CC BY 4.0
- Impact factor: 3.1 (2024)

Standard abbreviations
- ISO 4: Metabarcoding Metagenom.

Indexing
- ISSN: 2534-9708

Links
- Journal homepage

Metabarcoding & Metagenomics (often MBMG) is an open-access, online-only scientific journal covering basic and applied research in metabarcoding and metagenomics. Topics include biomonitoring, eDNA, molecular ecology, DNA-based species identification, species delimitation, bioinformatics, and related emerging fields.

MBMG has been published by Pensoft Publishers on the ARPHA publishing platform since the journal's launch in 2017. The journal is abstracted and indexed by the following databases:

- Emerging Sources Citation Index
- Scopus
- ProQuest (Natural Science Collection, Biological Science Database)
- BIOSIS
- Central & Eastern European Academic Source - CEEAS
- DOAJ
- Zoological Record
