= Probaenia grayi =

Scientific classification
- Kingdom: Animalia
- Phylum: Arthropoda
- Class: Insecta
- Order: Coleoptera
- Suborder: Polyphaga
- Infraorder: Cucujiformia
- Family: Chrysomelidae
- Genus: Probaenia
- Species: P. grayi

Binomial name
- Probaenia grayi (Baly, 1865)

Synonyms
- Uroplata grayi Chapuis, 1877; Probaenia rufitarsis Pic, 1933

Species of beetle

Probaenia grayi is a species of beetle of the family Chrysomelidae. It is found in Argentina, Brazil (Bahia, Minas Gerais, Paraná, Rio Grande do Sul, São Paulo) and Paraguay.

== Description ==
The head is moderately produced between the eyes, with the vertex longitudinally grooved. The antennae are longer than the head and thorax and the thorax is twice as broad as long, with the sides obliquely narrowed from just above the extreme base to the apex. The upper surface is subcylindrical in front, flattened and transversely excavated on the hinder disc, deeply impressed with large deep round punctures, which, closely crowded on the sides, are irregularly placed at much more distant intervals on the disc. The whole surface of the basal lobe is excavated, depressed. The scutellum is transverse, its apex obtuse. The elytra are scarcely broader at their base than the thorax and the humeral callus is laterally prominent, its apex not extending beyond the lateral border. The sides are gradually dilated from below their base to the hinder angles, narrowly margined, their outer edge distantly and irregularly serrate. The hinder angles are produced slightly outwards and obliquely upwards and scarcely backwards into a triangular plate, the upper surface of which is deeply concave, its apex obtuse, and its apical border armed with four or five coarse teeth. The upper surface is flattened, interspaces deeply gemellate-punctate, the first irregularly punctured at the base, a space on the outer disc just below the middle, extending between the second and fourth costae, irregularly punctured.

== Biology ==
The food plant is unknown.
