= Probaenia vittulosa =

Scientific classification
- Kingdom: Animalia
- Phylum: Arthropoda
- Class: Insecta
- Order: Coleoptera
- Suborder: Polyphaga
- Infraorder: Cucujiformia
- Family: Chrysomelidae
- Genus: Probaenia
- Species: P. vittulosa

Binomial name
- Probaenia vittulosa Weise, 1905

Species of beetle

Probaenia vittulosa is a species of beetle of the family Chrysomelidae. It is found in Bolivia, Brazil and Peru.

== Description ==
Adults reach a length of about 6-6.5 mm. The underside is yellowish-black, while the upperside is yellow. The antennae are black. The posterior angle of the elytra is laterally produced into a sharp tooth and the apical fascia and numerous bands are blackish-bronze.

== Biology ==
The food plant is unknown.
