= Probaenia tricolor =

Scientific classification
- Kingdom: Animalia
- Phylum: Arthropoda
- Class: Insecta
- Order: Coleoptera
- Suborder: Polyphaga
- Infraorder: Cucujiformia
- Family: Chrysomelidae
- Genus: Probaenia
- Species: P. tricolor

Binomial name
- Probaenia tricolor Pic, 1927

Species of beetle

Probaenia tricolor is a species of beetle of the family Chrysomelidae. It is found in South America.

== Description ==
Adults reach a length of about 7 mm. Adults are testaceous. The elytron is marked with red and yellow, laterally at the shoulders, in the middle and before the apex decorated with black-metallic.

== Biology ==
The food plant is unknown.
