= Probaenia luteonotata =

Scientific classification
- Kingdom: Animalia
- Phylum: Arthropoda
- Clade: Pancrustacea
- Class: Insecta
- Order: Coleoptera
- Suborder: Polyphaga
- Infraorder: Cucujiformia
- Family: Chrysomelidae
- Genus: Probaenia
- Species: P. luteonotata

Binomial name
- Probaenia luteonotata Pic, 1927

Species of beetle

Probaenia luteonotata is a species of beetle of the family Chrysomelidae. It is found in Argentina and Brazil (Bahia, Pernambuco).

== Description ==
Adults reach a length of about 7 mm. Adults are shiny black, with metallic black thorax and green elytron.

== Biology ==
The recorded food plants are Vernonia species.
