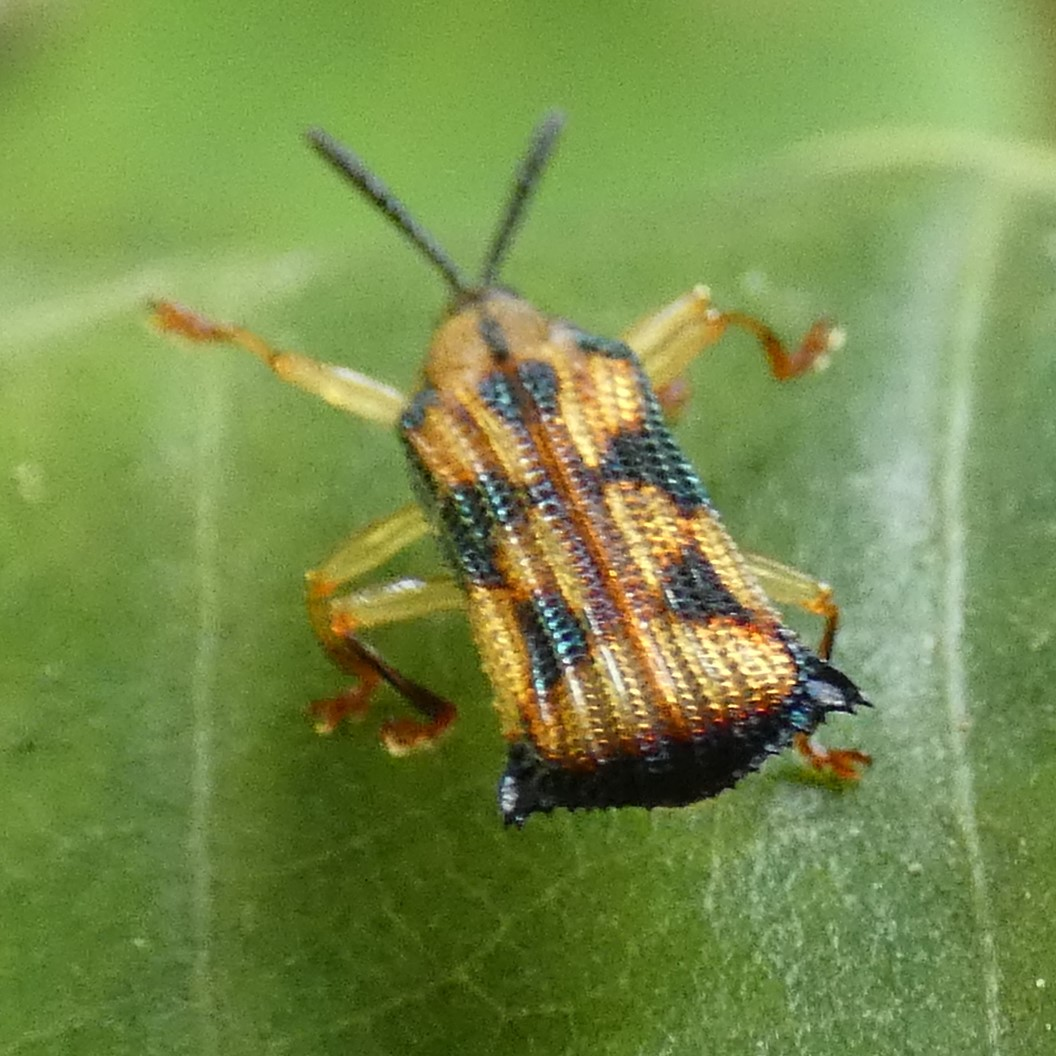

Scientific classification
- Kingdom: Animalia
- Phylum: Arthropoda
- Clade: Pancrustacea
- Class: Insecta
- Order: Coleoptera
- Suborder: Polyphaga
- Infraorder: Cucujiformia
- Family: Chrysomelidae
- Genus: Probaenia
- Species: P. pici

Binomial name
- Probaenia pici Uhmann, 1930

= Probaenia pici =

Species of beetle

Probaenia pici is a species of beetle in the family Chrysomelidae. It is found in Colombia, Costa Rica and Panama.

== Biology ==
The recorded food plant is Mikania guaco.
