= Probaenia fasciata =

Scientific classification
- Kingdom: Animalia
- Phylum: Arthropoda
- Class: Insecta
- Order: Coleoptera
- Suborder: Polyphaga
- Infraorder: Cucujiformia
- Family: Chrysomelidae
- Genus: Probaenia
- Species: P. fasciata

Binomial name
- Probaenia fasciata Weise, 1906

Species of beetle

Probaenia fasciata is a species of beetle of the family Chrysomelidae. It is found in Argentina, Brazil and Paraguay.

== Description ==
Adults reach a length of about 5.5-6 mm. Adults are black with a dull-yellow head. The elytra have various stripes and dots. There are four bands, the third interrupted in the middle and the fourth is connected at the apex. The bands are decorated with dark-green.

== Biology ==
The food plant is unknown.
