= Journal of Hymenoptera Research =

- Discipline: Systematics
- Language: English
- Edited by: Tamara Spasojevic

Publication details
- History: 1992-present
- Publisher: Pensoft Publishers on behalf of the International Society of Hymenopterists
- Frequency: Upon acceptance
- Open access: Yes
- License: Creative Commons by Attribution 4.0
- Impact factor: 1.7 (2025)

Standard abbreviations
- ISO 4: J. Hymenopt. Res.

Indexing
- CODEN: JHYREJ
- ISSN: 1070-9428 (print); 1314-2607 (web)
- LCCN: 98660130
- OCLC no.: 28308627

Links
- Journal homepage; Online access; Online archive

The Journal of Hymenoptera Research is a peer-reviewed scientific journal covering systematics, taxonomy, and ecology of Hymenoptera. It was established in 1992, and transferred to publishing with Pensoft Publishers in 2011, under an open access system.
