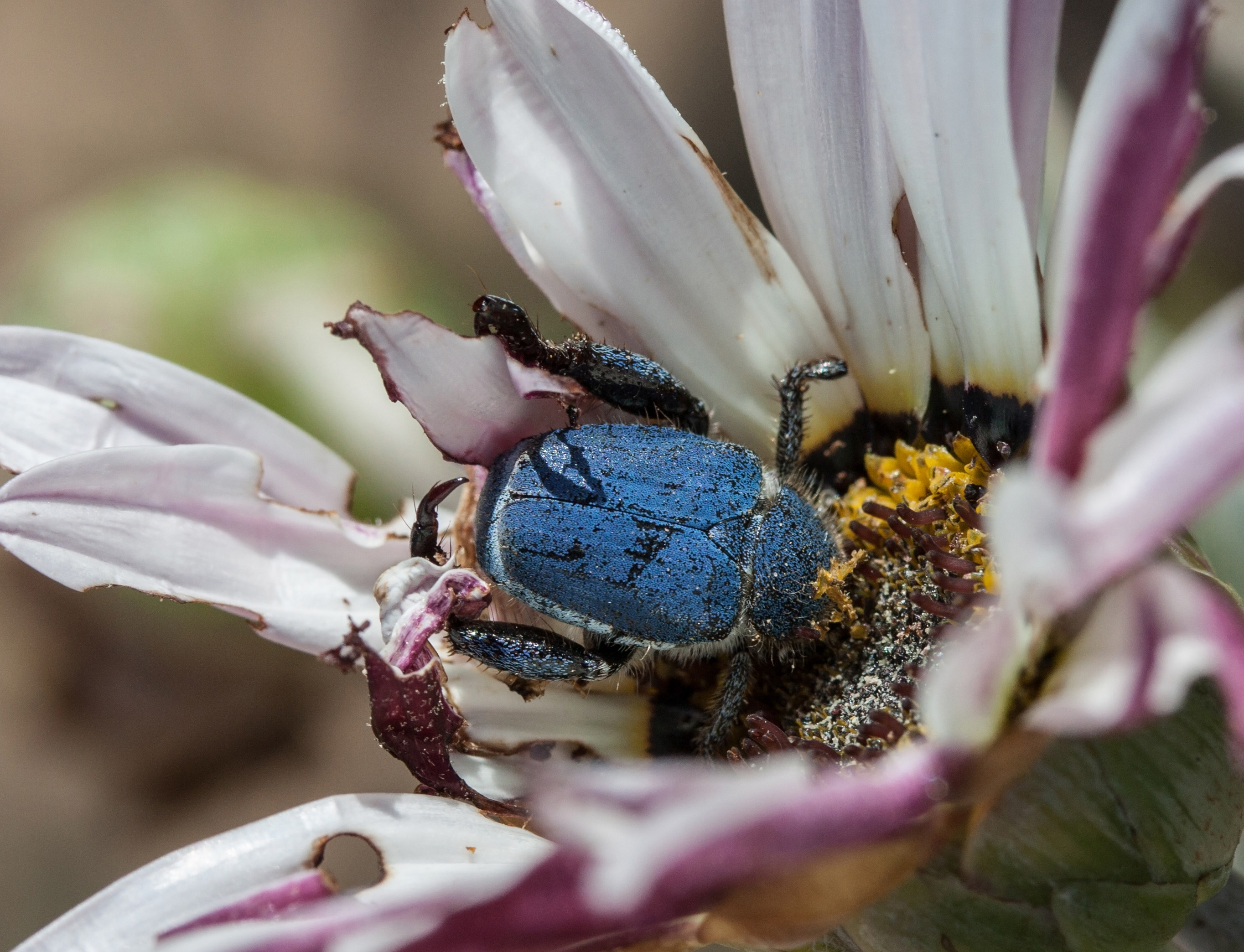
- Scelophysa trimeni

Scientific classification
- Kingdom: Animalia
- Phylum: Arthropoda
- Clade: Pancrustacea
- Class: Insecta
- Order: Coleoptera
- Suborder: Polyphaga
- Infraorder: Scarabaeiformia
- Family: Scarabaeidae
- Subfamily: Melolonthinae
- Tribe: Hopliini
- Subtribe: Hopliina
- Genus: Scelophysa; Burmeister, 1844

= Scelophysa =

Genus of beetles

Scelophysa is a genus of beetles belonging to the family Scarabaeidae.

== Species ==
- Scelophysa capensis Dombrow, 1999
- Scelophysa colvillei Dombrow, 2006
- Scelophysa endroedyyoungai Dombrow, 1999
- Scelophysa militaris (Gyllenhal, 1817)
- Scelophysa pickeri Dombrow, 2006
- Scelophysa pruinosa Burmeister, 1844
- Scelophysa scheffoldi Dombrow, 1999
- Scelophysa schoenherri Dombrow, 1999
- Scelophysa steineri Dombrow, 1999
- Scelophysa strandfonteinensis Dombrow, 1999
- Scelophysa trimeni Péringuey, 1885
- Scelophysa ulrichi Dombrow, 1999
