= Probaenia crenata =

Scientific classification
- Kingdom: Animalia
- Phylum: Arthropoda
- Clade: Pancrustacea
- Class: Insecta
- Order: Coleoptera
- Suborder: Polyphaga
- Infraorder: Cucujiformia
- Family: Chrysomelidae
- Genus: Probaenia
- Species: P. crenata

Binomial name
- Probaenia crenata (Blanchard, 1843)

Synonyms
- Odontota crenata Blanchard, 1843; Probaenia infirmior mimica Pic, 1933; Probaenia crenata interrupta Monrós & Viana, 1947; Probaenia crenata nigricollis Uhmann, 1927; Probaenia infirmior Weise, 1906; Probaenia crenata preapicalis Pic, 1933

Species of beetle

Probaenia crenata is a species of beetle of the family Chrysomelidae. It is found in Argentina, Bolivia, Brazil (Goiás, Minas Gerais, Matto Grosso, Paraná, Rio Grande do Sul, Rio de Janeiro, São Paulo), Colombia, Paraguay, Peru and possibly Chile.

== Biology ==
The recorded food plants are Inga affinis and Verbesina sordescens.
