= International Society of Hymenopterists =

Scholarly society

The International Society of Hymenopterists focuses on the study of the insect order of Hymenoptera. It was founded in 1982.

== International Congress of Hymenopterists ==
The society hosts an international congress every 4-5 years, previous meetings locations and dates are:

- Vancouver, Canada, July 6-7, 1988.
- Sheffield, U.K., August 11-17, 1991.
- Davis, California, August 13-16, 1995.
- Canberra, Australia, January 6-11, 1999.
- Beijing, China, July 22-26, 2002.
- Sun City, South Africa, June 22-26, 2006.
- Kőszeg, Hungary, June 20-26, 2010.
- Cusco, Peru, July 20-25, 2014.
- Matsuyama, Japan, July 23-27, 2018.
- Iasi, Romania, July 23-29, 2023

The next congress has been planned to be in Mexico City, Mexico from August 10-14, 2026.

== Journal ==
Since 1992, the society publishes the Journal of Hymenoptera Research. The current editor-in-chief is Tamara Spasojevic.
