= Probaenia ruficeps =

Scientific classification
- Kingdom: Animalia
- Phylum: Arthropoda
- Class: Insecta
- Order: Coleoptera
- Suborder: Polyphaga
- Infraorder: Cucujiformia
- Family: Chrysomelidae
- Genus: Probaenia
- Species: P. ruficeps

Binomial name
- Probaenia ruficeps Pic, 1927

Species of beetle

Probaenia ruficeps is a species of beetle of the family Chrysomelidae. It is found in Peru.

== Description ==
Adults reach a length of about 8 mm. Adults are shining red, with the antennae, three thoracic bands and the hind legs partly black. The elytron is rufous, with a sinuous sutural band and a shorter lateral band, as well as a transverse band at the middle, another before the apex and an apical band. These bands are blackish-cyan.

== Biology ==
The food plant is unknown.
