= Probaenia viridiceps =

Scientific classification
- Kingdom: Animalia
- Phylum: Arthropoda
- Class: Insecta
- Order: Coleoptera
- Suborder: Polyphaga
- Infraorder: Cucujiformia
- Family: Chrysomelidae
- Genus: Probaenia
- Species: P. viridiceps

Binomial name
- Probaenia viridiceps Pic, 1927

Species of beetle

Probaenia viridiceps is a species of beetle of the family Chrysomelidae. It is found in Bolivia.

== Description ==
Adults reach a length of about 8 mm. Adults are shining black or greenish. The elytron is testaceous, with a sinuous sutural band, a shorter lateral band, a transverse band in front of the middle and apical band. These bands are green-metallic.

== Biology ==
The food plant is unknown.
