= Probaenia militaris =

Scientific classification
- Kingdom: Animalia
- Phylum: Arthropoda
- Clade: Pancrustacea
- Class: Insecta
- Order: Coleoptera
- Suborder: Polyphaga
- Infraorder: Cucujiformia
- Family: Chrysomelidae
- Genus: Probaenia
- Species: P. militaris

Binomial name
- Probaenia militaris (Baly, 1864)

Synonyms
- Uroplata militaris Baly, 1864

Species of beetle

Probaenia militaris is a species of beetle of the family Chrysomelidae. It is found in Bolivia and Brazil (Amazonas).

== Description ==
The head smooth, finely granulose and moderately produced between the eyes. The antennae are black. The thorax is twice as broad as long, much narrowed in front and the sides narrowly margined, obsoletely crenulate, rounded, but sinuate near the apex. The anterior angles are slightly produced into a subacute tooth. The surface is closely covered with large fulvous rounded punctures. The extreme lateral border and an interrupted longitudinal line down the middle of the disk dark are metallic green. The scutellum is shining fulvous, the apical half of its surface horizontal, concave, its apex obtusely rounded. The elytra are broader than the thorax, slightly increasing in width towards the posterior angles, the latter produced almost directly outwards into a broadly dilated acute spine, the apex of which is curved slightly backwards, its upper surface longitudinally elevated. The sides are narrowly margined, finely and somewhat distantly serrated. The apical margin is narrow, obtusely truncate, its edge serrate. Each elytron has four elevated costae, the two outer ones less distinct than the others, the second from the lateral border being interrupted in the middle of its course.

== Biology ==
The food plant is unknown.
