= Pensoft Publishers =

Scientific publishing house

- Status: Active
- Founded: 1992
- Founder: Lyubomir Penev, Sergei Golovatch
- Country of origin: Bulgaria
- Headquarters location: Sofia
- Distribution: Worldwide
- Publication types: Scientific journals and Books
- Nonfiction topics: Taxonomy (biology), Biodiversity, Systematics, Entomology, Zoology, Botany, Ecology
- Official website: www.pensoft.net

Pensoft Publishers (also known as: Pensoft) are a publisher of scientific literature based in Sofia, Bulgaria. Pensoft was founded in 1992, by two academics: Lyubomir Penev and Sergei Golovatch. It has published over 1000 academic and professional books and currently publishes over 60 peer-reviewed open access scientific journals including ZooKeys, PhytoKeys, Check List, Comparative Cytogenetics, Journal of Hymenoptera Research, Deutsche Entomologische Zeitschrift, Metabarcoding & Metagenomics and Zoosystematics and Evolution.

Pensoft is part of the open-access publishing movement. The Creative Commons Attribution License (CC-BY) is used for all journal articles. In 2012, Pensoft established a partnership with Encyclopedia of Life called the EOL Open Access Support Project (EOASP) to financially support independent taxonomists, and taxonomists living in developing countries to publish their results in Pensoft journals.

Pensoft were notably one of the first publishers to facilitate the publication of data papers in collaboration with the Global Biodiversity Information Facility (GBIF). The first data paper they published came out in 2011, published in the journal ZooKeys.

Pensoft also published the first ever eukaryotic species description (Eupolybothrus cavernicolus) to combine transcriptomics, DNA barcoding, and micro-CT imaging data in the same paper, in the Biodiversity Data Journal.

== Awards ==
In June 2016, one of Pensoft's journals called Research Ideas and Outcomes (short name: RIO Journal) won a Scholarly Publishing and Academic Resources Coalition (SPARC) Innovator Award for "promoting and expanding transparency in scientific communication".

== List of journals ==
- Acta Ichthyologica et Piscatoria
- African Invertebrates
- Alpine Entomology (formerly Journal of the Swiss Entomological Society)
- ARPHA Conference Abstracts
- ARPHA Proceedings
- Biodiversity Data Journal
- Biodiversity Information Science and Standards (BISS)
- BioRisk
- Caucasiana
- Check List
- Comparative Cytogenetics
- Deutsche Entomologische Zeitschrift
- Evolutionary Systematics
- Food Modeling Journal
- Fossil Record
- Herpetozoa
- Italian Botanist
- Journal of Hymenoptera Research
- Journal of Orthoptera Research
- Metabarcoding & Metagenomics
- MycoKeys
- Nature Conservation
- NeoBiota
- Neotropical Biology and Conservation
- Nota Lepidopterologica
- One Ecosystem
- Pharmacia
- PhytoKeys
- Plant Sociology
- Research Ideas and Outcomes
- Silva Balcanica
- Subterranean Biology
- Travaux du Muséum National d'Histoire Naturelle "Grigore Antipa" (The Journal of "Grigore Antipa" National Museum of Natural History)
- Vegetation Classification and Survey
- Viticulture Data Journal
- Zitteliana
- ZooKeys
- Zoologia
- Zoosystematics and Evolution
