= Probaenia donckieri =

Scientific classification
- Kingdom: Animalia
- Phylum: Arthropoda
- Class: Insecta
- Order: Coleoptera
- Suborder: Polyphaga
- Infraorder: Cucujiformia
- Family: Chrysomelidae
- Genus: Probaenia
- Species: P. donckieri

Binomial name
- Probaenia donckieri Pic, 1927

Species of beetle

Probaenia donckieri is a species of beetle of the family Chrysomelidae. It is found in Brazil (Goiás).

== Description ==
Adults reach a length of about 8 mm. Adults are testaceous, the thorax has a short green stripe in the middle. There is an interrupted lateral stripe before the apex on the elytron, as well as a pre-scutellar spot and two green bands.

== Biology ==
The food plant is unknown.
