= Probaenia latefasciata =

Scientific classification
- Kingdom: Animalia
- Phylum: Arthropoda
- Class: Insecta
- Order: Coleoptera
- Suborder: Polyphaga
- Infraorder: Cucujiformia
- Family: Chrysomelidae
- Genus: Probaenia
- Species: P. latefasciata

Binomial name
- Probaenia latefasciata Pic, 1927

Species of beetle

Probaenia latefasciata is a species of beetle of the family Chrysomelidae. It is found in Peru.

== Description ==
Adults reach a length of about 7 mm. Adults are shiny black, with a red thorax. The elytron is black, with red markings are bands.

== Biology ==
The food plant is unknown.
