= Probaenia clermonti =

Scientific classification
- Kingdom: Animalia
- Phylum: Arthropoda
- Clade: Pancrustacea
- Class: Insecta
- Order: Coleoptera
- Suborder: Polyphaga
- Infraorder: Cucujiformia
- Family: Chrysomelidae
- Genus: Probaenia
- Species: P. clermonti

Binomial name
- Probaenia clermonti Pic, 1933

Species of beetle

Probaenia clermonti is a species of beetle of the family Chrysomelidae. It is found in Brazil.

== Description ==
Adults reach a length of about 5 mm. Adults are black, with testaceous and green markings and black antennae.

== Biology ==
The food plant is unknown.
