= Probaenia viridinotata =

Scientific classification
- Kingdom: Animalia
- Phylum: Arthropoda
- Class: Insecta
- Order: Coleoptera
- Suborder: Polyphaga
- Infraorder: Cucujiformia
- Family: Chrysomelidae
- Genus: Probaenia
- Species: P. viridinotata

Binomial name
- Probaenia viridinotata Pic, 1927

Species of beetle

Probaenia viridinotata is a species of beetle of the family Chrysomelidae. It is found in Brazil.

== Description ==
Adults reach a length of about 8 mm. Adults are reddish-brown, the elytra marked with four black dots.

== Biology ==
The food plant is unknown.
