= Probaenia purpureotincta =

Scientific classification
- Kingdom: Animalia
- Phylum: Arthropoda
- Class: Insecta
- Order: Coleoptera
- Suborder: Polyphaga
- Infraorder: Cucujiformia
- Family: Chrysomelidae
- Genus: Probaenia
- Species: P. purpureotincta

Binomial name
- Probaenia purpureotincta Pic, 1927

Synonyms
- Probaenia purpureotincta reducta Pic, 1927

Species of beetle

Probaenia purpureotincta is a species of beetle of the family Chrysomelidae. It is found in Bolivia.

== Description ==
Adults reach a length of about 8 mm. Adults are reddish, with the antennae, part of the body and head more or less black. The elytron is testaceous, partly tinged with purple, with cyan or green bands.

== Biology ==
The food plant is unknown.
