= Probaenia bicoloripes =

Scientific classification
- Kingdom: Animalia
- Phylum: Arthropoda
- Clade: Pancrustacea
- Class: Insecta
- Order: Coleoptera
- Suborder: Polyphaga
- Infraorder: Cucujiformia
- Family: Chrysomelidae
- Genus: Probaenia
- Species: P. bicoloripes

Binomial name
- Probaenia bicoloripes Pic, 1927

Species of beetle

Probaenia bicoloripes is a species of beetle of the family Chrysomelidae. It is found in Brazil (Rio Grande do Sul).

== Description ==
Adults reach a length of about 6 mm. Adults are yellow, with the legs partly brown and the head with a broad, dark-green spot. The elytron is blackish-green, with yellow spots.

== Biology ==
The food plant is unknown.
