= Probaenia decipiens =

Scientific classification
- Kingdom: Animalia
- Phylum: Arthropoda
- Class: Insecta
- Order: Coleoptera
- Suborder: Polyphaga
- Infraorder: Cucujiformia
- Family: Chrysomelidae
- Genus: Probaenia
- Species: P. decipiens

Binomial name
- Probaenia decipiens (Chapuis, 1877)

Synonyms
- Uroplata (Uroplata) decipiens Chapuis, 1877

Species of beetle

Probaenia decipiens is a species of beetle of the family Chrysomelidae. It is found in Brazil (São Paulo).

== Biology ==
The food plant is unknown.
