= Probaenia forsteri =

Scientific classification
- Kingdom: Animalia
- Phylum: Arthropoda
- Class: Insecta
- Order: Coleoptera
- Suborder: Polyphaga
- Infraorder: Cucujiformia
- Family: Chrysomelidae
- Genus: Probaenia
- Species: P. forsteri

Binomial name
- Probaenia forsteri Uhmann, 1957

Species of beetle

Probaenia forsteri is a species of beetle of the family Chrysomelidae. It is found in Bolivia.

== Description ==
Adults reach a length of about 5.4 mm. Adults are light yellowish-brown with green metallic markings on the pronotum and elytra, while the head is reddish-yellow-brown. The antennae are black.

== Biology ==
The food plant is unknown.
