= Nature Conservation =

- Discipline: Conservation Biology
- Language: English

Publication details
- History: 2012-present
- Publisher: Pensoft Publishers
- Frequency: Upon acceptance
- Open access: Yes
- License: Creative Commons Attribution 4.0
- Impact factor: 1.8 (2025)

Standard abbreviations
- ISO 4: Nat. Conserv.

Indexing
- ISSN: 1314-6947

Links
- Journal homepage; Online access

Nature Conservation is a peer-reviewed open access scientific journal covering Conservation Biology. It was established in 2012 by Pensoft Publishers. The editor-in-chief is Klaus Henle.

== Abstracting and indexing ==
The journal is abstracted and indexed in:

- Science Citation Index Expanded.
- Current Contents/Agriculture, Biology & Environmental Sciences.
- BIOSIS Previews.

According to the Journal Citation Reports, the journal has a 2015 impact factor of 1.120.
