= Sociedade Brasileira de Zoologia =

- Abbreviation: SBZ
- Formation: 1978
- Type: Learned society
- Purpose: Promoting zoological studies
- Location: Av. Coronel Francisco Heráclito dos Santos, s/n, Curitiba, Paraná, Brazil
- Official language: Portuguese
- President: Luciane Marinoni
- 1st secretary: Hussam El Dine Zaher
- 2nd secretary: Luís Fábio Silveira
- Affiliations: Departamento de Zoologia (Federal University of Paraná)
- Website: link

The Sociedade Brasileira de Zoologia (transl. "Brazilian Society of Zoology"), founded in 1978, is a scientific society devoted to Zoology. It publishes the journal Zoologia.

== List of presidents ==
- 1978–1980: José Cândido de Melo Carvalho
- 1980–1982: José Willibaldo Thomé
- 1982–1988: Nelson Papavero
- 1988–1990: Renato Contin Marinoni
- 1990–1992: Adriano Lúcio Peracchi
- 1992–1996: Jayme de Loyola e Silva
- 1996–2004: Olaf H. H. Mielke
- 2004–2008: Mário Antonio Navarro da Silva
- 2008–2012: Rodney Ramiro Cavichioli
- 2012–2016: Rosana Moreira da Rocha
- 2016–2018: Luciane Marinoni
