= Probaenia quadrivittata =

Scientific classification
- Kingdom: Animalia
- Phylum: Arthropoda
- Clade: Pancrustacea
- Class: Insecta
- Order: Coleoptera
- Suborder: Polyphaga
- Infraorder: Cucujiformia
- Family: Chrysomelidae
- Genus: Probaenia
- Species: P. quadrivittata

Binomial name
- Probaenia quadrivittata Pic, 1927

Species of beetle

Probaenia quadrivittata is a species of beetle of the family Chrysomelidae. It is found in Brazil.

== Description ==
Adults reach a length of about 8 mm. Adults are shiny, red, with a black thorax with four stripes. The elytron is green with five bands.

== Biology ==
The food plant is unknown.
