= Comparative Cytogenetics =

- Discipline: Systematics
- Language: English
- Edited by: Valentina G. Kuznetsova, Ilya A. Gavrilov-Zimin

Publication details
- History: 2007-present
- Publisher: Pensoft Publishers
- Frequency: Upon acceptance
- Open access: Yes
- License: Creative Commons Attribution 4.0
- Impact factor: 0.9 (2025)

Standard abbreviations
- ISO 4: Comp. Cytogenet.

Indexing
- ISSN: 1993-0771 (print); 1993-078X (web)
- OCLC no.: 781491880

Links
- Journal homepage; Online access; Online archive (2007-2009)

Comparative Cytogenetics is a peer-reviewed open access scientific journal covering plant and animal cytogenetics, karyosystematics, and molecular systematics. It was established in 2007 by the Zoological Institute of the Russian Academy of Sciences. In 2009 it switched to Pensoft Publishers. The editors-in-chief are Valentina G. Kuznetsova and Ilya A. Gavrilov-Zimin (Russian Academy of Science).

== Abstracting and indexing ==
The journal is abstracted and indexed in:

- Science Citation Index Expanded.
- Current Contents/Agriculture, Biology & Environmental Sciences.
- The Zoological Record.
- BIOSIS Previews.

According to the Journal Citation Reports, the journal has a 2013 impact factor of 1.211.
