= Probaenia tibiella =

Scientific classification
- Kingdom: Animalia
- Phylum: Arthropoda
- Class: Insecta
- Order: Coleoptera
- Suborder: Polyphaga
- Infraorder: Cucujiformia
- Family: Chrysomelidae
- Genus: Probaenia
- Species: P. tibiella

Binomial name
- Probaenia tibiella Weise, 1905

Synonyms
- Probaenia uhmanni Pic, 1927

Species of beetle

Probaenia tibiella is a species of beetle of the family Chrysomelidae. It is found in Bolivia, Brazil (Goiás, Matto Grosso), Colombia and Peru.

== Description ==
Adults reach a length of about 7.8 mm. Adults are black, with a red spot on the head between the eyes. The elytron is testaceous with green spots at the scutellum, three blackish-green bands, as well as a green band.

== Biology ==
The food plant is unknown.
