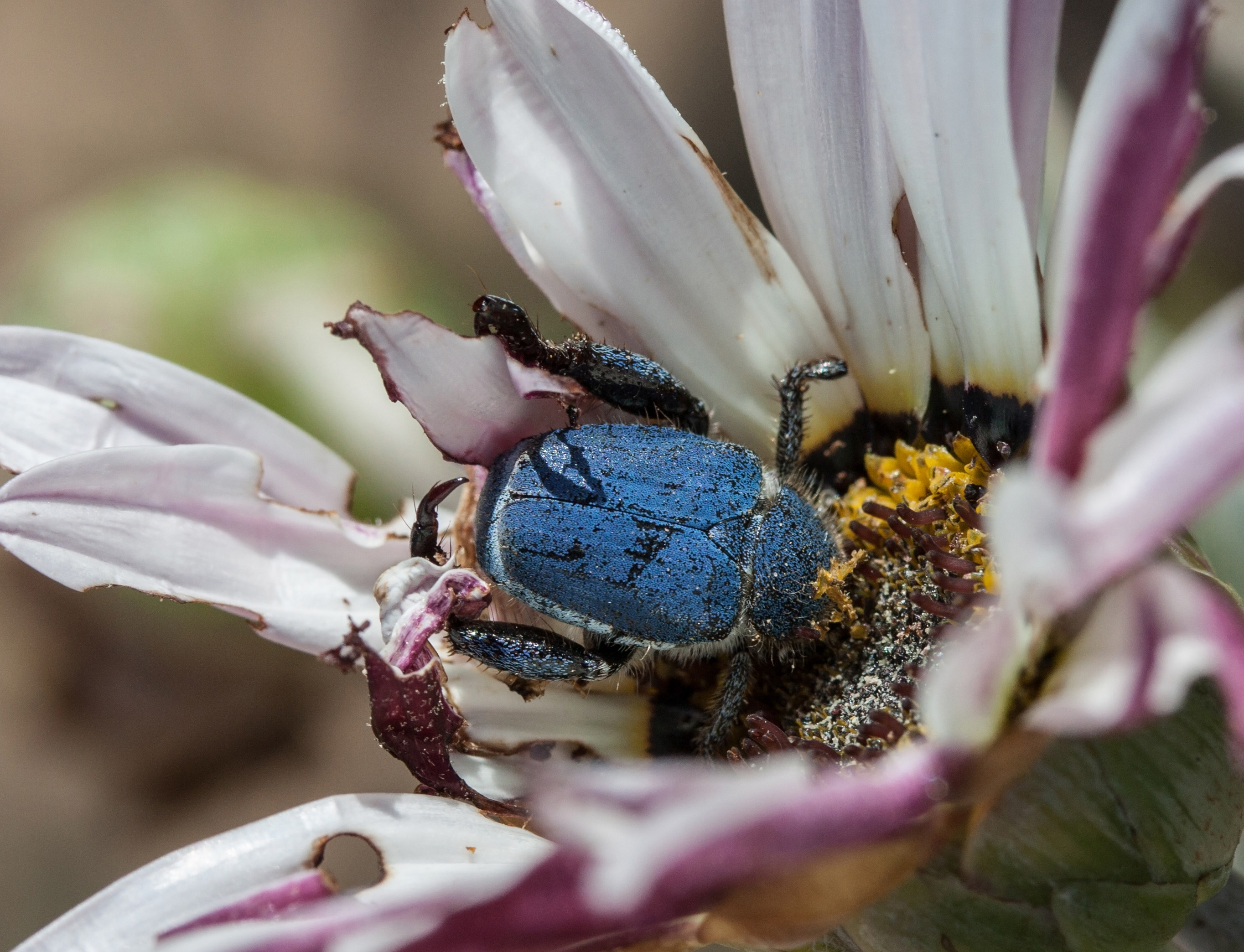
- Male S. trimeni feeding on Arctotis decurrens in Port Nolloth, South Africa

Scientific classification
- Kingdom: Animalia
- Phylum: Arthropoda
- Class: Insecta
- Order: Coleoptera
- Suborder: Polyphaga
- Infraorder: Scarabaeiformia
- Family: Scarabaeidae
- Genus: Scelophysa
- Species: S. trimeni

Binomial name
- Scelophysa trimeni Péringuey, 1885

Synonyms
- Scelophysa ornatissima Nonfried, 1895

= Scelophysa trimeni =

Species of scarab beetle endemic to South Africa

Scelophysa trimeni, commonly known as the blue monkey beetle, is a species of scarab beetles in the tribe Hopliini, subfamily Melolonthinae.

It is found exclusively in South Africa, particularly the Namaqualand region. As with other monkey beetles, blue monkey beetles have characteristically moveable and unequally sized tarsal claws, particularly on the strong hind legs of the males. Males of the species are covered in minute sky-blue scales while the scales of the females are sienna brown.

Blue monkey beetles are important pollinators of the Namaqualand region, especially for Mesembryanthemum and some daisy species, on which they primarily feed.

== Taxonomy ==
Scelophysa trimeni is classified under the genus Scelophysa in the tribe Hopliini of the subfamily Rutelinae in the scarab beetle family Scarabaeidae. It was first described in 1885 by Louis Péringuey, a noted French entomologist who was director of the South African Museum for eighteen years. He published his description of the species in the journal of the South African Philosophical Society (now the Royal Society of South Africa). Roland Trimen, another notable entomologist, was a contemporary of Péringuey, preceding him as director of the museum, and it is presumed that the specific epithet trimeni is in honour of Trimen. This may be confirmed by the text of Péringuey's paper, which is not accessible at present.

In 1895, Czech entomologist Anton Franz Nonfried published a description of a new species he called Scelophysa ornatissima in the journal Berliner entomologische Zeitschrift (now Deutsche Entomologische Zeitschrift). It was later determined to be the same species as S. trimeni and S. ornatissima became a synonym.

== Morphology ==
Blue monkey beetles are small, usually 9 to 11 millimetres (0.35 to 0.43 in) long and 5 mm (0.2 in) wide. Males and females exhibit little sexual dimorphism in overall body size. Very small scales cover most of the body, including the middle and hind pairs of legs, and excepting the head and anterior legs. The scales in males are bright ultramarine to sky blue dorsally, and the underside scales are more silvery. Female colouring is an overall sienna brown, with a mix of brown and yellow-orange scales, and with darker bands of scales found near the pygidium and propygidium. The black legs bear a few thick black hairs. Dense short greyish to silvery white fine hairs cover the margins of the thorax and abdomen.

The tibia of each leg bears a single tibial spur. The tarsal claws are double and unequal, with one weak, slender claw pressed against the larger, stronger claw. The claws of the hind legs are particularly large. In males the hind legs are also more strongly developed than in females, swollen and more robust through the femora, tibiae, and tarsi.

Little is recorded on the appearance of the larvae. They are commonly known as white grubs, a general term for the larvae of most scarab beetles.

== Ecology and behaviour ==
Scelophysa trimeni is endemic to South Africa. This is unsurprising considering that 69% of all monkey beetle species can be found in South Africa, and of them 98% are endemic. S. trimeni prefers the sandy and coastal regions of Namaqualand, such as Knersvlakte and Port Nolloth, respectively.

Adult blue monkey beetles are typically found grouped in the centres of unscented flowers that bear dark discs and bright petals with spot patterns at the bases. They feed on the pollen, embedding their heads into the discs and browsing, and sometimes supporting themselves by hooking their hind tarsal claws onto the flower petals. Pollen is swept into the mouth by dense setae on the maxillae. The behavioural tendency to congregate is for mating purposes, and it is suggested that male beetles prefer dark-centred flowers with spot patterns because they mistake the glossy discs and bright spots for resting females.

Flowers of the genus Mesembryanthemum are common hosts of S. trimeni, as are many of the African daisy species and some Heliophila. For many of these visited species, monkey beetles are key pollinators, responsible for most of the pollination that takes place.

Larvae are presumed to feed in the soil on the debris and roots of plants.
