= Probaenia nigritarsis =

Scientific classification
- Kingdom: Animalia
- Phylum: Arthropoda
- Class: Insecta
- Order: Coleoptera
- Suborder: Polyphaga
- Infraorder: Cucujiformia
- Family: Chrysomelidae
- Genus: Probaenia
- Species: P. nigritarsis

Binomial name
- Probaenia nigritarsis Weise, 1905

Synonyms
- Probaenia nigritarsis obliterata Pic, 1927

Species of beetle

Probaenia nigritarsis is a species of beetle of the family Chrysomelidae. It is found in Brazil (Goiás).

== Description ==
Adults reach a length of about 6.5-7 mm. The underside is yellowish-black, while the upperside is testaceous-yellow. The antennae are black. The elytra has a lateral band (which is shortened in the middle), an apical band and three bands with some small spots composed of blue-, or green-bronze-black.

== Biology ==
The food plant is unknown.
