= Louis Péringuey =

South African entomologist (1855–1924)

- Born: 9 October 1855; Bordeaux, France
- Died: 20 February 1924 (aged 68); Cape Town, South Africa
- Education: University of the Cape of Good Hope
- Spouse: Bertha Marcellis (m. 1892)
- Scientific career
- Fields: Entomology
- Workplaces: South African Museum (1882-1924)

Louis Albert Péringuey MSc (French pronunciation: [lwi albɛʁ peʁɛ̃ɡɛ]; 9 October 1855, Bordeaux – 20 February 1924, Cape Town) was a South African entomologist who specialised in Coleoptera and prehistory.

== Biography ==
Péringuey was a collector for museums in Senegal, Gambia and Madagascar for three years, before emigrating in 1879 to Cape Town in Cape Colony, where he taught French at the South African College and the Diocesan College. He worked as a volunteer on Coleoptera at the South African Museum in 1882, and two years later became a member of the permanent staff. Shortly after he also took up an appointment as inspector-general of vineyards.

At the age of 37 he married Bertha Marcellis. Three years later, in 1895, he was put in charge of the Invertebrate Collection, and in 1896 becoming assistant director of the Museum. When the post of Director fell vacant in 1906 following Sclater's resignation, the Board of Trustees had no hesitation in appointing Péringuey as director. In the same year he started delivering lectures in forest entomology at the S.A. College, and was awarded a doctorate in Natural Sciences by the University of the Cape of Good Hope. Despite financial stringencies, the Museum engaged in an active program of collecting, research and publication. A dearth of transport meant that collectors often had to travel by train, donkey-cart and ox-wagon. He made important contributions in the field of physical anthropology, and produced a set of plaster casts of the San to record their physical appearance.

An overcrowded museum made expansion necessary, but the outbreak of World War I stopped all construction. Péringuey persuaded the authorities to purchase four old corrugated iron buildings in 1922, which subsequently served as store rooms.

Péringuey was powerfully built and tall, dynamic and strong-willed. He had an enormous capacity for work, and a prodigious memory, but was also short-tempered and obstinate, with a great distrust of academics. His dislike of Germans led to his naming the genus Bochus in the family Gryllacrididae, and the type species contemnendus (i.e. 'contemptible German'). When the family was revised many years later by an Austrian authority, the taxon was found to be a synonym of B. puncticeps, translating as 'the German with the pointy head'.

On 20 February 1924, aged 69, Péringuey died near the Museum while walking home.

He wrote Descriptive catalogue of the coleoptera of South Africa (1897) and many short scientific papers describing new taxa. His collections are divided between the Iziko South African Museum, Transvaal Museum, Museo Civico di Storia Naturale di Genova and the collections of the German Entomological Institute.

== Taxon Named after him ==
Species named after him include

- Peringuey's leaf-toed gecko (Cryptactites peringueyi),
- Peringuey's adder (Bitis peringueyi),

and

- the cocktail ant (Crematogaster peringueyi).

== Taxon described by him ==
- Scelophysa trimeni (1885)

== Stellenbosch Archaeological Reserve ==
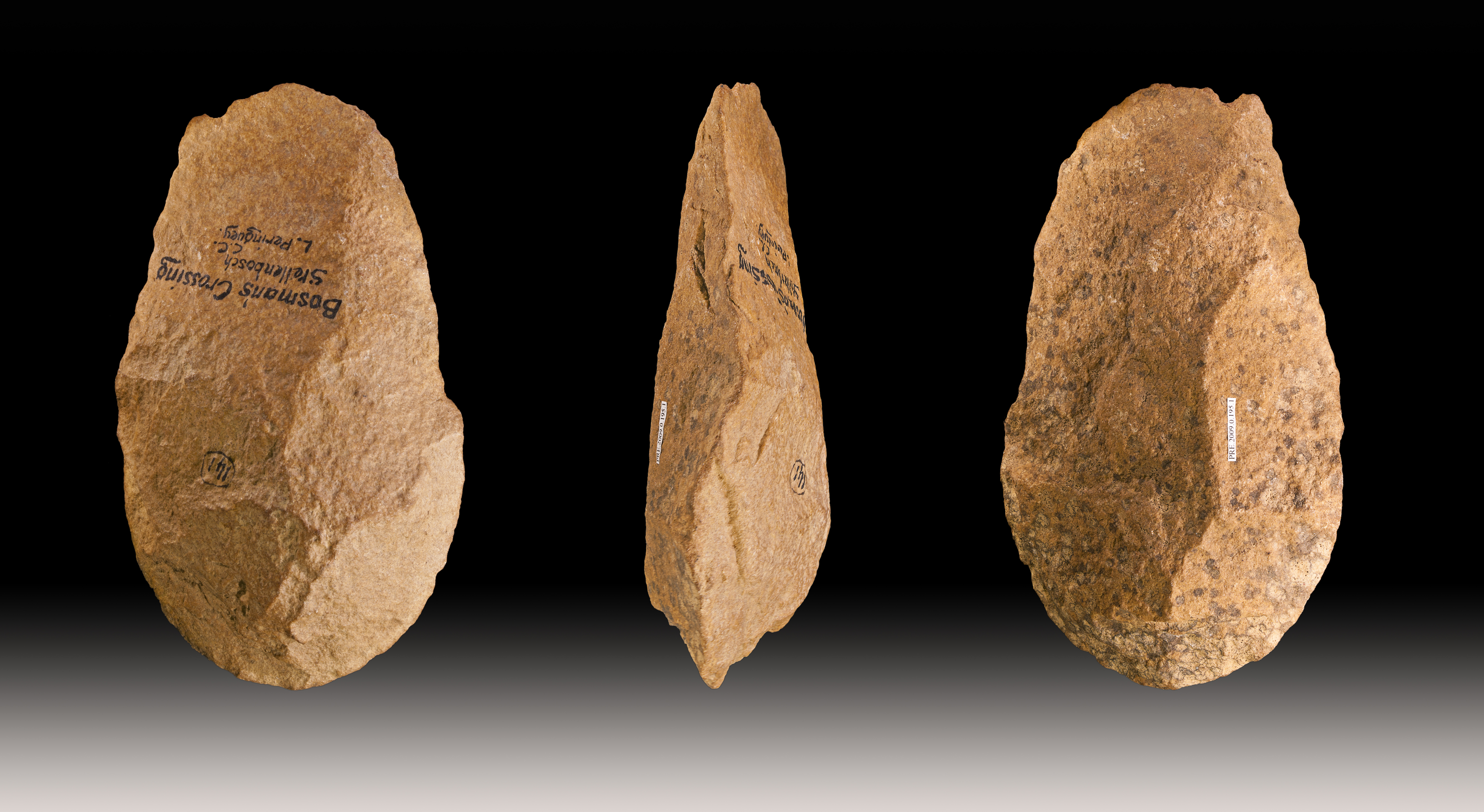
Paleolithic biface from Stellenbosch collected by Péringuey

In 1899 Péringuey discovered Paleolithic stone tools of the Acheulean type at a site named Bosman's Crossing near the Adam Tas Bridge at the western entrance to the town of Stellenbosch in South Africa. A plaque was erected at the site in 1962 by the Historical Monuments Commission with the following text:

Stellenbosch Archaeological Reserve
In a road-makers borrow-pit here in 1899
Louis Perinquey made the first discovery
of "Stellenbosch" stone implements
and thereby proved the great antiquity of man
in South Africa.
