= Probaenia variolaris =

Scientific classification
- Kingdom: Animalia
- Phylum: Arthropoda
- Class: Insecta
- Order: Coleoptera
- Suborder: Polyphaga
- Infraorder: Cucujiformia
- Family: Chrysomelidae
- Genus: Probaenia
- Species: P. variolaris

Binomial name
- Probaenia variolaris Weise, 1905

Species of beetle

Probaenia variolaris is a species of beetle of the family Chrysomelidae. It is found in Argentina and Brazil.

== Description ==
Adults reach a length of about 6-8 mm. The underside is red, while the upperside is yellow. The elytra are covered with variable red- and bronze-black spots and stripes.

== Biology ==
The food plant is unknown.
