= Probaenia armigera =

Scientific classification
- Kingdom: Animalia
- Phylum: Arthropoda
- Class: Insecta
- Order: Coleoptera
- Suborder: Polyphaga
- Infraorder: Cucujiformia
- Family: Chrysomelidae
- Genus: Probaenia
- Species: P. armigera

Binomial name
- Probaenia armigera (Baly, 1885)

Synonyms
- Uroplata armigera Baly, 1885

Species of beetle

Probaenia armigera is a species of beetle of the family Chrysomelidae. It is found in Belize and Nicaragua.

== Description ==
The interocular space is moderately produced and the vertex and front are smooth and impunctate, the latter with a small nitidous tubercle. The antennae are rather longer than the head and thorax, the joints cylindrical and the club obsoletely compressed. They are blackish-piceous, while the basal joint and club are piceo-fulvous. The thorax is twice as broad at the base as long, the sides quickly converging from immediately above the base towards the apex, very slightly rounded. The upper surface is transversely excavated on the hinder disc, rugose-punctate, the medial line with a narrow longitudinal groove. The elytra are broader than the thorax, with the sides parallel, slightly dilated posteriorly, the apex obtusely truncate. The outer margin is minutely serrulate, the serratures not stronger on the apical margin than on the sides. The posterior angle is produced laterally into a strong acute triangular plate, the surface of which is obliquely thickened and convex. Each elytron has ten, at the extreme base with eleven, regular rows of punctures, the second, fourth, and eighth interspaces costate, the eighth rather less elevated than the others. Anterior thighs beneath armed with two small acute teeth, the four posterior ones unidentate.

== Biology ==
The recorded food plant is Mikania guaco.
