= Laundry list =

Laundry list may refer to:

- Laundry list song
- List of laundry topics

== See also ==
- Shopping list
- To do list
- Checklist
- Laundry
