= Probaenia germaini =

Scientific classification
- Kingdom: Animalia
- Phylum: Arthropoda
- Class: Insecta
- Order: Coleoptera
- Suborder: Polyphaga
- Infraorder: Cucujiformia
- Family: Chrysomelidae
- Genus: Probaenia
- Species: P. germaini

Binomial name
- Probaenia germaini Pic, 1927

Species of beetle

Probaenia germaini is a species of beetle of the family Chrysomelidae. It is found in Bolivia.

== Description ==
Adults reach a length of about 5 mm. Adults are testaceous, the elytron with green markings.

== Biology ==
The food plant is unknown.
