= Research Ideas and Outcomes =

- Discipline: Multidisciplinary
- Language: English

Publication details
- History: 2015-present
- Publisher: Pensoft Publishers
- Frequency: Continuously
- Open access: Yes
- License: CC BY 4.0

Standard abbreviations
- ISO 4: Res. Ideas Outcomes

Indexing
- ISSN: 2367-7163
- LCCN: 2017238083
- OCLC no.: 956261946

Links
- Journal homepage

The Research Ideas and Outcomes (RIO) is a journal claimed to be both peer-reviewed, and open-access, published by Pensoft Publishers, stating a goal to promote transparency, reliability, and effectiveness in scientific research.

Since its 2015 launch, the journal has been widely noticed on social media, with the proposal to publish practically any serious-looking submission being questioned.

== History ==
The journal was established in 2015 with the idea of publishing research outputs of different kinds including computer programs, experimental data, and analysis workflows. One year after its foundation, it received a SPARC Innovator Award from the Scholarly Publishing and Academic Resources Coalition for its work in encouraging transparency in science.

== Abstracting and indexing ==
The journal is abstracted and indexed in ProQuest databases.

== See also ==
- Open science
- Open research
