= Check List =

- Discipline: Zoology, botany, mycology
- Language: English
- Edited by: Felipe Moreira

Publication details
- History: 2005–present
- Publisher: Pensoft
- Frequency: Bimonthly
- Open access: Yes
- License: Creative Commons
- Impact factor: 0.6 (2025)

Standard abbreviations
- ISO 4: Check List

Indexing
- ISSN: 1809-127X
- LCCN: 2010207582
- OCLC no.: 768090069

Links
- Journal homepage; Online archive

Check List is a peer-reviewed open access scientific journal that publishes Annotated Lists of Species, Notes on Geographic Distribution, Distribution Summary, Book Reviews, and Forum Papers. The journal was established in 2005 to serve as a means of publishing inventories that are essential for studies on biogeography and provide a baseline for conservation studies. Since 2017 it has been published by Pensoft Publishers.

== Abstracting and indexing ==
The journal is abstracted and indexed in EBSCOhost, Scopus, The Zoological Record, and the Directory of Open Access Journals. The journal is also member of the Brazilian Association of Science Editors and the Committee on Publication Ethics.
