= Probaenia tessellata =

Scientific classification
- Kingdom: Animalia
- Phylum: Arthropoda
- Class: Insecta
- Order: Coleoptera
- Suborder: Polyphaga
- Infraorder: Cucujiformia
- Family: Chrysomelidae
- Genus: Probaenia
- Species: P. tessellata

Binomial name
- Probaenia tessellata Weise, 1905

Species of beetle

Probaenia tessellata is a species of beetle of the family Chrysomelidae. It is found in Brazil (Bahia, Minas Gerais).

== Description ==
Adults reach a length of about 7 mm. The underside is reddish, while the upperside is yellowish-testaceous. The disc of the elytra has steel-blue spots.

== Biology ==
The recorded food plants are Asteraceae species.
