= Deutsche Entomologische Zeitschrift =

- Discipline: Systematics
- Language: English

Publication details
- Former name: Berliner Entomologische Zeitschrift
- History: 1857-present
- Publisher: Pensoft Publishers on behalf of the Museum für Naturkunde
- Frequency: Upon acceptance
- Open access: Yes
- Impact factor: 1.4 (2025)

Standard abbreviations
- ISO 4: Dtsch. Entomol. Z.

Indexing
- ISSN: 1435-1951 (print); 1860-1324 (web)
- OCLC no.: 1909060532

Links
- Journal homepage; Online access; Online archive

Deutsche Entomologische Zeitschrift (DEZ) is a peer-reviewed open access scientific journal covering systematic and taxonomic entomology. It was established in 1857 as Berliner Entomologische Zeitschrift and obtained its current title in 1875. Since 2014, it has been published by Pensoft Publishers on behalf of the Museum für Naturkunde.

== Publication history ==
In 1857, the then 26-year old Gustav Kraatz published the first volume of the Berliner Entomologische Zeitschrift, which was distributed among the members of the Berliner Entomologische Verein (BEV). In 1875, starting with the 19th volume, the journal was renamed Deutsche Entomologische Zeitschrift. In 1880, a dispute lead to the society splitting into two: Kraatz founded the Deutsche Entomologische Gesellschaft (DEG), which 240 members of the original society joined (including most of the coleopterists). The original society as a result was then mainly formed by lepidopterists. From 1881 to 1913, the Berliner Entomologische Verein published their journal under its original title, Berliner Entomologische Zeitschrift, while in the same period the Deutsche Entomologische Gesellschaft separately published the Deutsche Entomologische Zeitschrift. The two societies would not reunite until 1914, following Kraatz's death in 1909. From 1914 onwards, the reunited society used the name Deutsche Entomologische Gesellschaft, while the Deutsche Entomologische Zeitschrift and Berliner Entomologische Zeitschrift were once again a single title, Deutsche Entomologische Zeitschrift.

During World War II, the entire print run of the journal's 1944 volume was destroyed in a bomb raid on the train transporting it from Neubrandenburg to Berlin. The following year, the society ceased activities and the journal ceased publication.

After World War II ended, the Deutsche Entomologische Gesellschaft was newly registered as a society in 1953. The following year, the Humboldt University of Berlin agreed to fund the publication of the journal, and the Deutsche Entomologische Zeitschrift, Neue Folge began being published by the Akademie-Verlag Berlin. In 1991, the Akademie-Verlag Berlin was bought by Wiley-VCH. In 1998, Wiley-VCH began publishing the Deutsche Entomologische Zeitschrift in a new format and layout and exclusively in English. In 2014, Pensoft Publishers became the new publisher for the journal, which itself became open access.
