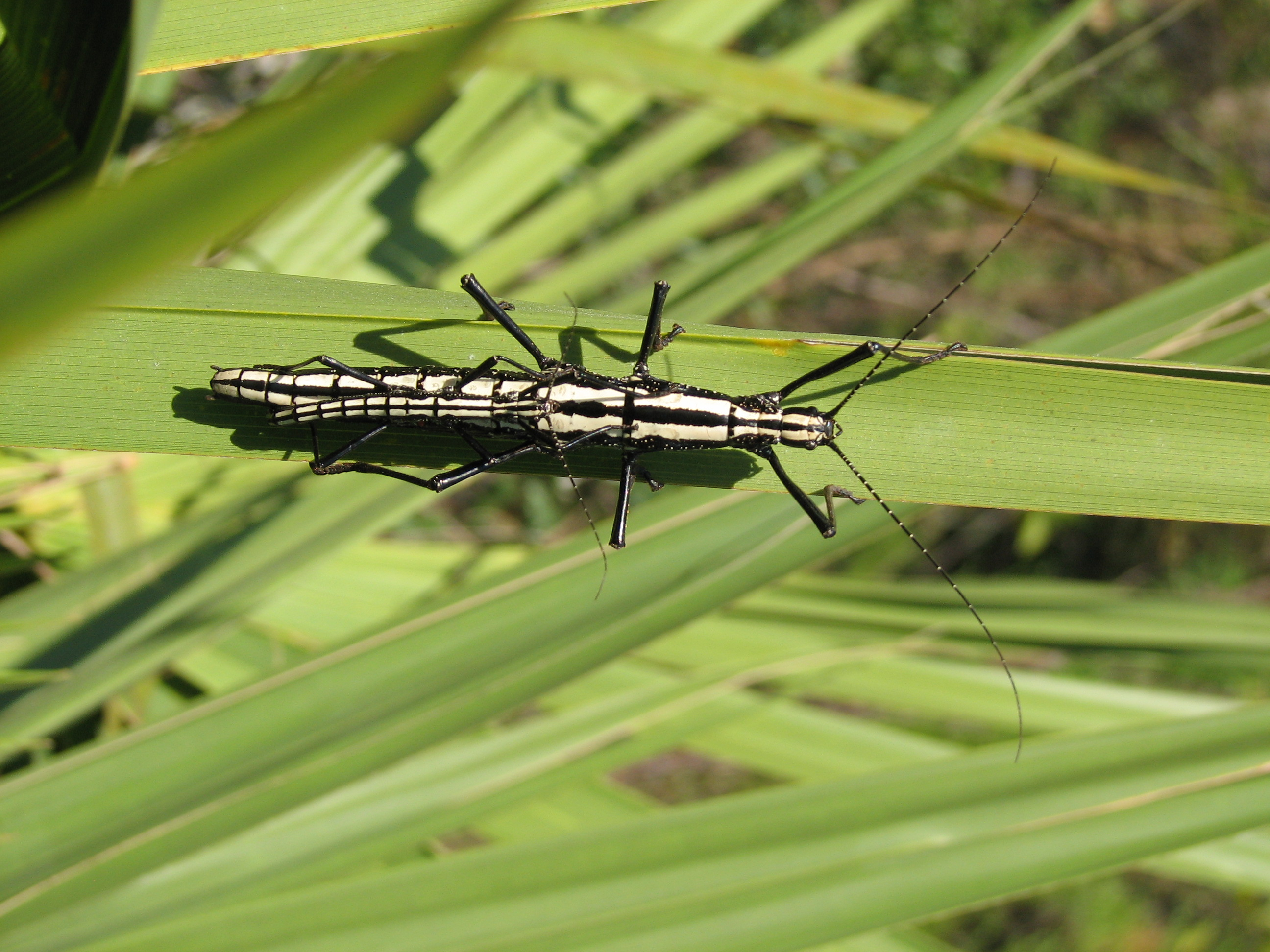
- White color form

Scientific classification
- Kingdom: Animalia
- Phylum: Arthropoda
- Clade: Pancrustacea
- Class: Insecta
- Order: Phasmatodea
- Family: Pseudophasmatidae
- Genus: Anisomorpha
- Species: A. buprestoides

Binomial name
- Anisomorpha buprestoides (Stoll, 1813)

= Anisomorpha buprestoides =

Species of stick insect

Anisomorpha buprestoides, the southern two-striped walkingstick, devil rider, or musk mare, is a stick insect (order Phasmatodea: otherwise known as "phasmids" or walkingsticks) which occurs throughout the southeastern United States.

Anisomorpha buprestoides is a large, stout (for a stick insect) brown phasmid with three conspicuous longitudinal black stripes. Females average 67.7 mm (2.67 in) in length; males are smaller and more slender, averaging 41.7 mm (1.64 in).

== Defense ==
This species, and another in the same genus (Anisomorpha ferruginea, whose range is more west and north, but may overlap with A. buprestoides) is particularly well known for its very potent chemical defense spray which it deploys from a pair of glands which open at the front of its thorax. They are capable of selectively targeting the eyes, and are known to be capable of causing significant injury if successful. The "Devil rider" nickname for this insect likely comes from this defense, as well as the fact that they are most frequently encountered in the late summer and fall when they are active adults at a time when almost all of them are found in mating pairs, with the smaller male riding on the back of the larger female. The chemical defense of this species was first studied by Thomas Eisner and Jerrold Meinwald (two scientists at Cornell University who helped found the field of chemical ecology). The chemical defense spray of this species was found to contain predominantly a cyclopentanyl monoterpene dialdehyde compound which they called "anisomorphal".

== Color morphs ==
Color morphs

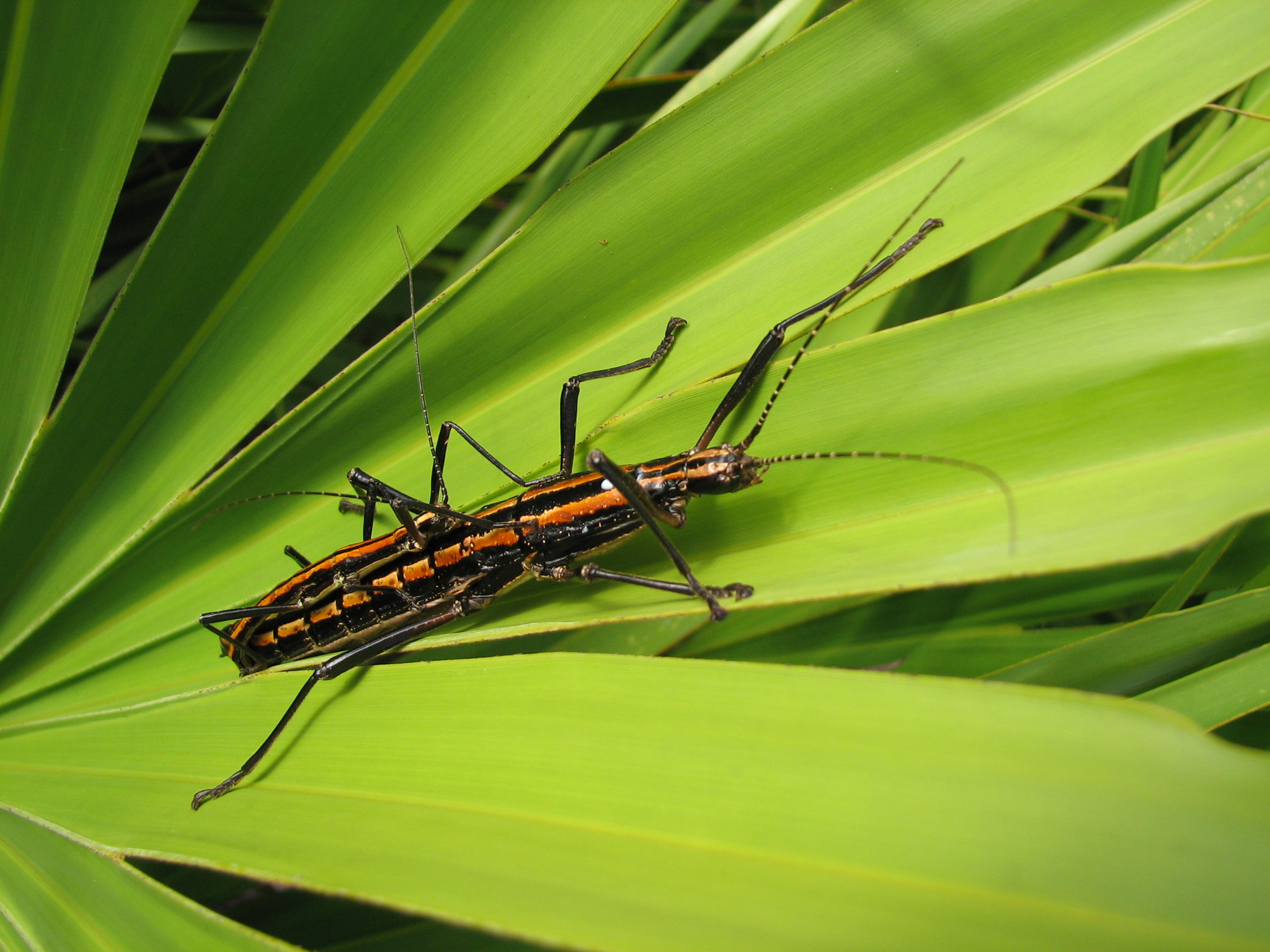
Orange color form

This insect comes in three regionally specific color forms: a "brown form" which is predominantly dark brown with light brown stripes, a "white form" that is jet black with bright white stripes and an "orange form". The white and orange forms are only known to occur in relatively small specific areas of Florida. All three color forms each have unique behaviors of aggregation, diurnal activity cycles and egg laying which conform to the ecological conditions in which they are found. They have also been determined to produce somewhat unusual chemical defense cocktails (at least as adults) – with the white and orange forms producing primarily "anisomorphal" and the brown form producing either anisomorphal or peruphasmal (a stereoisomer of anisomorphal), depending on the population sampled. Nymphs of the brown form have been shown to produce predominantly varying mixtures of anisomorphal and dolichodial (another stereoisomer of anisomorphal) with peruphasmal remaining a trace component until they are sexually mature. Additionally, the chemical defense of this species, as well as that of other phasmids, has been found to contain glucose, which may be involved in the later stages of its biosynthetic pathway similar to pathways shown for some leaf beetles (family Chrysomelidae). The white color form was featured on the cover of the March issue of Annals of the Entomological Society of America, 2009. The orange color form was also featured on the cover of the issues of the Journal of Natural Products from July through December, 2011.
