= Donald W. Roberts =

Researcher of insect fungal diseases

- Born: January 20, 1933; Phoenix, Arizona, US
- Died: May 2, 2021 (aged 88)
- Education: Brigham Young University, Iowa State University, University of California, Berkeley
- Known for: Metarhizium anisopliae, now M. robertsii, see § Patronymic taxa
- Scientific career
- Fields: entomopathogenic fungi, biological pest control, entomology, mycology
- Workplaces: Biology Department, Utah State University
- Theses: Toxins from the entomogenous fungus Metarrhizium anisopliae: I. Production in submerged and surface cultures, and in inorganic and organic nitrogen media; Toxins from the entomogenous fungus Metarrhizium anisopliae: II. Symptoms and detection in moribund hosts
- Doctoral advisors: Edward Arthur Steinhaus and Mauro M.E. Martignoni
- Website: biology.usu.edu/about/emeriti/roberts-donald

Donald W. Roberts (January 20, 1933 – May 2, 2021) was an American insect pathologist and one of the originators of that field. He was especially known for research into biological pest control of Lepidoptera by Metarhizium but also Beauveria bassiana. He was a Research Professor Emeritus in the Biology Department of Utah State University.

== Early life and education ==
Born in Phoenix, Arizona, US, in 1933. He earned his bachelor's degree in Zoology, minoring in Botany, from Brigham Young University in 1957. He received his master's degree in Entomology, minor in Mycology, from Iowa State University in 1959. He earned his PhD in 1964 from University of California, Berkeley on the then-named Metarhizium anisopliae (now M. robertsii, see § Patronymic taxa below) and its application as a biological control of Lepidoptera.

== Postdoctoral career ==
In 1965, Roberts was hired as an Assistant Rank Insect Pathologist by the Boyce Thompson Plant Research Institute.

Helicoverpa armigera was spreading and invading several countries around the world in 1976, when he was sponsored by the Rockefeller Foundation and the National Science Foundation (NSF) to test a nuclear polyhedrosis virus in India.

When that was completed in 1978 he then traveled to work for the Brazilian government on fungal controls of pasture spittlebugs. That lasted until 1981.

In 1980 Roberts founded the Insect Pathology Resources Center at Cornell University. Roberts then went back to work for Boyce when the IPRC became part of Boyce.

Roberts collected fungal pathogens of Nilaparvata lugens in Sri Lanka in 1984.

Roberts was a frequent collaborator of Raymond J. St. Leger, who was also chosen to give the Society for Invertebrate Pathology's Founders' Lecture in his honor in 2009.

=== Awards and honors ===
1978 — US National Science Foundation – US/India Exchange Scientist

1985 — Fulbright Senior Research Scholarship to the University of Sydney, Australia

— University of Sydney – Thomas Lawrence Pawlett Scholarship

1986–1988 — The Society for Invertebrate Pathology – Vice President

— Entomological Society of America, Eastern Branch – CIBA-GEIGY Recognition Award

1988–1990 — The Society for Invertebrate Pathology – President

1989 — ESA-EB – L.O. Howard Distinguished Achievement Award

1996 — Boyce Thompson Institute – made Roy A. Young Scientist Emeritus

— Entomological Society of Brazil (Sociedade Brasileira de Entomologia) – honorary membership and recognition award

1996 — Society for Invertebrate Pathology – Founders' Lecturer – on Agostino Bassi who had been retired for some time

2009 — Society for Invertebrate Pathology – Founders' Honoree award, and Founders' Lecture on his career – given by his friend and longtime collaborator R. St. Leger

=== Patronymic taxa ===
The species he has become associated with more than any other – the former M. anisopliae – was renamed Metarhizium robertsii in recognition of his vast contributions.

== Personal life and death ==
Roberts and his wife, Mae, had two children. He died on May 2, 2021, at the age of 88.

== Selected bibliography ==
- Ph.D. dissertation, 1964:

- Roberts, Donald W. (1966). "Toxins from the entomogenous fungus Metarrhizium anisopliae: I. Production in submerged and surface cultures, and in inorganic and organic nitrogen media". Journal of Invertebrate Pathology. 8 (2). Society for Invertebrate Pathology (AP): 212–221. doi:10.1016/0022-2011(66)90131-5. ISSN 0022-2011. PMID 5949415. S2CID 38321891.
- Roberts, Donald W. (1966). "Toxins from the entomogenous fungus Metarrhizium anisopliae: II. Symptoms and detection in moribund hosts". Journal of Invertebrate Pathology. 8 (2). Society for Invertebrate Pathology (AP): 222–227. doi:10.1016/0022-2011(66)90132-7. ISSN 0022-2011. PMID 5949416. S2CID 30149754.

- Roberts, Donald W. (1969). "Toxins from the entomogenous fungus Metarrhizium anisopliae: Isolation of destruxins from submerged cultures". Journal of Invertebrate Pathology. 14 (1). Society for Invertebrate Pathology (AP): 82–88. doi:10.1016/0022-2011(69)90012-3. ISSN 0022-2011. S2CID 84866562.
- Nolan, RA (1977). Roberts, Donald W.; Strand, Mary A. (eds.). "Pathogens of Glossina (tsetse flies)". Bulletin of the World Health Organization. 55 (Suppl 1): 265–270. PMC 2366771. PMID 332395.
- Roberts, Donald W.; Aist, J.R., eds. (1984). Conference Report on Infection Processes of Fungi. New York: Rockefeller Foundation. S2CID 82572412. AGRIS id US881786488.

—Cited by

- Carruthers, Raymond I.; Feng, Ziding; Robson, Douglas S.; Roberts, Donald W. (1985). "In vivo temperature-dependent development of Beauveria bassiana (Deuteromycotina: Hyphomycetes) mycosis of the European corn borer, Ostrinia nubilalis (Lepidoptera: Pyralidae)". Journal of Invertebrate Pathology. 46 (3). Society for Invertebrate Pathology (AP): 305–311. doi:10.1016/0022-2011(85)90073-4. ISSN 0022-2011. S2CID 85113809.

—Cited by

- Wraight, S. P.; Roberts, Donald W. (1986). Insect control efforts with fungi. Developments in Industrial Microbiology. Vol. 28. San Francisco: Society for Industrial Microbiology. pp. 77–87. ISSN 0070-4563. S2CID 89069928. INIST PASCAL# 7442687.

—Cited by

- Butt, T.M.; Wraight, S.P.; Galaini-Wraight, S.; Humber, R.A.; Roberts, Donald W.; Soper, R.S. (1988). "Humoral encapsulation of the fungus Erynia radicans (Entomophthorales) by the potato leafhopper, Empoasca fabae (Homoptera: Cicadellidae)". Journal of Invertebrate Pathology. 52 (1). Society for Invertebrate Pathology (AP): 49–56. doi:10.1016/0022-2011(88)90101-2. ISSN 0022-2011. AGRIS id US8854531.

—Cited by

- Feng, Ziding; Carruthers, Raymond I.; Larkin, Timothy S.; Roberts, Donald W. (1988). "A Phenology Model and Field Evaluation of Beauveria Bassiana (Bals.) Vuillemin (Deuteromycotina: Hyphomycetes) Mycosis of the European Corn Borer, Ostrinia Nubilalis (Hbn.) (Lepidoptera: Pyralidae)". The Canadian Entomologist. 120 (2). Entomological Society of Canada (CUP): 133–144. doi:10.4039/ent120133-2. ISSN 0008-347X. S2CID 85655161.

—Cited by

- Goettel, M. S.; Leger, Raymond J. St.; Rizzo, N. W.; Staples, R. C.; Roberts, Donald W. (August 1, 1989). "Ultrastructural Localization of a Cuticle-degrading Protease Produced by the Entomopathogenic Fungus Metarhizium anisopliae during Penetration of Host (Manduca sexto) Cuticle". Microbiology. 135 (8). Microbiology Society: 2233–2239. doi:10.1099/00221287-135-8-2233. ISSN 1350-0872. S2CID 84772616.

—Cited by

- Allee, Leslie L.; Goettel, Mark S.; Gol'berg, Alla; Whitney, H. S.; Roberts, Donald W. (1990). "Infection by Beauveria bassiana of Leptinotarsa decemlineata larvae as a consequence of fecal contamination of the integument following per os inoculation". Mycopathologia. 111 (1). International Union of Microbiological Societies (Springer): 17–24. doi:10.1007/bf02277296. ISSN 0301-486X. S2CID 34163123.

—Cited by

- Galaini-Wraight, Sandra; Wraight, Stephen P.; Carruthers, Raymond I.; Magalhães, Bonifacio P.; Roberts, D.W. (1991). "Description of a Zoophthora radicans (Zygomycetes: Entomophthoraceae) epizootic in a population of Empoasca kraemeri (Homoptera: Cicadellidae) on beans in central Brazil". Journal of Invertebrate Pathology. 58 (3). Society for Invertebrate Pathology (AP): 311–326. doi:10.1016/0022-2011(91)90176-q. ISSN 0022-2011. S2CID 84997863.

—Cited by

- Hajek, Ann E.; Roberts, Donald W. (1991). "Pathogen reservoirs as a biological control resource: Introduction of Entomophaga maimaiga to North American Gypsy Moth, Lymantria dispar, populations". Biological Control. 1 (1). Elsevier: 29–34. doi:10.1016/1049-9644(91)90098-k. ISSN 1049-9644. S2CID 83483886.

—Cited by

- Krasnoff, S.B.; Gupta, S.; St. Leger, Raymond J.; Renwick, J.A.A.; Roberts, Donald W. (September 1991). "Antifungal and Insecticidal Properties of the Efrapeptins: Metabolites of the Fungus Tolypocladium niveum". Journal of Invertebrate Pathology. 58 (2). Society for Invertebrate Pathology (AP): 180–88. doi:10.1016/0022-2011(91)90062-U.

—Cited as "Myco-and entomotoxigenic properties of the efrapeptins: toxins of the fungus Tolypocladium niveum" by among others

- Leger, Raymond J. St.; Goettel, M.; Roberts, Donald W.; Staples, R.C. (1991). "Prepenetration events during infection of host cuticle by Metarhizium anisopliae". Journal of Invertebrate Pathology. 58 (2). Society for Invertebrate Pathology (AP): 168–179. doi:10.1016/0022-2011(91)90061-t. ISSN 0022-2011.

—Cited by

- Leger, Raymond J. St.; Staples, R. C.; Roberts, Donald W. (April 1, 1991). "Changes in translatable mRNA species associated with nutrient deprivation and protease synthesis in Metarhizium anisopliae". Journal of General Microbiology. 137 (4). Microbiology Society: 807–815. doi:10.1099/00221287-137-4-807. ISSN 0022-1287.

—Cited by

- Goettel, M.S; Roberts, Donald W. (1992). "Mass production, formulation and field application of entomopathogenic fungi". In Lomer, C.; Prior, C. (eds.). Biological Control of Locusts and Grasshoppers: State of the Art. Wallingford, UK: CAB International. pp. 230–8. S2CID 87599395. AGRIS id GB9124448. GS cluster 3368875991079380518.

—Cited by

- St. Leger, Raymond J.; Frank, David C.; Roberts, Donald W.; Staples, Richard C. (1992). "Molecular cloning and regulatory analysis of the cuticle-degrading-protease structural gene from the entomopathogenic fungus Metarhizium anisopliae". European Journal of Biochemistry. 204 (3). Federation of European Biochemical Societies (Wiley): 991–1001. doi:10.1111/j.1432-1033.1992.tb16721.x. ISSN 0014-2956. PMID 1551399. S2CID 26992320.

—Cited by

- St. Leger, Raymond J.; May, B.; Allee, L.L.; Frank, D.C.; Staples, R.C.; Roberts, Donald W. (1992). "Genetic differences in allozymes and in formation of infection structures among isolates of the entomopathogenic fungus Metarhizium anisopliae". Journal of Invertebrate Pathology. 60 (1). Society for Invertebrate Pathology (AP): 89–101. doi:10.1016/0022-2011(92)90159-2. ISSN 0022-2011.

—Cited by

- Roberts, Donald W.; Gupta, Sandeep; St. Leger, Raymond J. (1992). "Metabolite Production by Entomopathogenic Fungi". Pesquisa Agropecuaria Brasileira. 27: 325–347.

—Cited by

- St. Leger, Raymond J.; Allee, L.L.; May, B.; Staples, R.C.; Roberts, Donald W. (1992). "World-wide distribution of genetic variation among isolates of Beauveria spp". Mycological Research. 96 (12). British Mycological Society (Elsevier): 1007–1015. doi:10.1016/s0953-7562(09)80108-1. ISSN 0953-7562. S2CID 83911802.

—Cited by

- Roberts, Donald W.; Hajek, Ann E. (1992). "Entomopathogenic Fungi as Bioinsecticides". Frontiers in Industrial Mycology. Boston, MA: Springer US. pp. 144–159. doi:10.1007/978-1-4684-7112-0_10. ISBN 978-1-4684-7112-0. S2CID 82385422.

—Cited by

- Bidochka, Michael J.; McDonald, Melanie A.; Leger, Raymond J. St.; Roberts, Donald W. (1994). "Differentiation of species and strains of entomopathogenic fungi by random amplification of polymorphic DNA (RAPD)". Current Genetics. 25 (2). Springer: 107–113. doi:10.1007/bf00309534. ISSN 0172-8083. PMID 8087878. S2CID 20736619.

—Cited by

- Roberts, Donald W.; St. Leger, Raymond J. (August 2, 2004). "1) Metarhizium spp., Cosmopolitan Insect-Pathogenic Fungi: Mycological Aspects". In Laskin, Allen; Bennett, Joan; Gadd, Geoffrey (eds.). Advances in Applied Microbiology. Vol. 54. Amsterdam: Academic Press. pp. 1–70/viii+385. doi:10.1016/S0065-2164(04)54001-7. ISBN 978-0-08-049020-5. OCLC 648302000. PMID 15251275. S2CID 239801. ISBN 9780120026562

== See also ==
- Raymond J. St. Leger
