= Raymond St. Leger =

British entomologist

- Born: April 1, 1957 (age 69); London, England
- Education: Exeter University; University of Bath
- Scientific career
- Fields: Entomology Mycology Biotechnology
- Workplaces: Cornell University; University of Maryland
- Doctoral advisor: Professors Keith Charnley and Richard Cooper

Raymond J. St. Leger (born 1957, in London, England) is an American mycologist, entomologist, molecular biologist and biotechnologist who currently holds the rank of Distinguished University Professor in the Department of Entomology (https://entomology.umd.edu/) in the College of Computer, Mathematics, and Natural Sciences (CMNS) at the University of Maryland, College Park.

== Research and career ==
St. Leger went to the United States to begin his career at the Boyce Thompson Institute at the invitation of Donald W. Roberts. According to Google Scholar, he has since then published more than 150 scientific papers and book chapters on fungal pathogens of plants, animals and insects, and on the reactions of hosts to infection. St. Leger has principally used entomopathogenic fungus (fungi that act as parasites of insects), as models for understanding how pathogens in general respond to stress, changing environments, initiate host invasion, colonize tissues, and counter host immune responses. These investigations have also addressed the mechanisms by which new pathogens emerge with different host ranges and genetic variation between individuals in host defenses. Other interests include fungal and insect behavior and evolution, molecular biology and genomics of fungi, and mutualistic associations between microbes and plants that can be exploited to benefit agriculture.

St. Leger is also known for developing transgenic technologies, including altering insect pathogens so that they carry genes encoding spider and scorpion toxins. A field trial in Burkina Faso has shown that these engineered pathogens have the potential to control insect borne diseases such as malaria. St. Leger has tested an array of "alternative engineering strategies to be consistent with the highly exploratory approach required for optimizing a pathogens biocontrol potential". For example, engineering a mosquito pathogenic fungus to carry a gene for a human anti-malarial antibody so that the fungus targets the malarial parasite in the mosquito reduces the possibility of mosquitoes evolving resistance to the fungus.

In 2024, a study co-authored by St. Leger and published in PLOS Pathogens revealed that two strains of pathogenic fungi unexpectedly divide insect victims between themselves rather than aggressively compete for resources.

In a paper published in Scientific Reports in 2025, St. Leger and colleagues described how they engineered a naturally occurring fungus called Metarhizium to produce insect-specific neurotoxins that kill when injected into a female mosquito’s body. By spraying male mosquitoes with fungal spores, scientists could ensure the spread of the fungus to the female mosquitoes the males mated with. In tests conducted in Burkina Faso in West Africa, the team found that nearly 90% of the female mosquitoes died within two weeks after mating with males carrying the modified fungus, compared to only 4% mortality in the group without the modified fungus. Though the modified Metarhizium fungus is deadly to female mosquitoes, it is harmless to humans.

Also in 2025, St. Leger published a paper in Nature Microbiology that described a new strain of Metarhizium fungus engineered to imitate a flower’s sweet scent and lure mosquitoes to their deaths. In 2026, St. Leger published a study in the Proceedings of the National Academy of Sciences that found that Metarhizium robertsii strains capable of using a wider range of nutrients were both faster and deadlier at killing insects and more effective at colonizing plant roots.

St. Leger has been a consultant on biotechnology to many private and public concerns, including the NIH, the USDA, the NSF, the US State Department and the Organization of American States. St. Leger has also served on many national and international policy-making committees including the Bill Gates funded National Academies Committee to study technologies to benefit Sub Saharan Africa and South Asia (2009).

St. Leger is an advocate of online open education and since 2013 has co-taught with Dr. Tammatha O'Brien (https://tammatha.weebly.com/) a MOOC on the Coursera platform called Genes and the Human Condition that has had more than 200,000 active learners.

== Education ==
St. Leger received his Bachelor of Science in biology from Exeter University, England in 1978, a Master of Science in entomology in 1980 from Birkbeck College, London University, and a Doctor of Philosophy in 1985 from the University of Bath, England.

== Awards and honors ==
St. Leger has received several awards for his research, he was elected a fellow of the AAAS (2012), the American Academy of Microbiology (2013), the Royal Entomological Society of London (FRES) (2011), the Entomological Society of America (2019) and is a Fellow of the Royal Society of Biology (FRSB). He received the American Society for Microbiology Promega Biotechnology Research Award (2017) and was the inaugural recipient of the Tai Fung-Lan Award for International Cooperation from The Mycological Society of China (2016). St. Leger received an honorary doctorate from his alma mater of Exeter University in 2018 and the Newcomb Cleveland Prize for the most impactful paper published in the journal Science in 2019. St. Leger gave the Founders lecture at the 2009 Society of Invertebrate Pathology Meeting honoring his friend and frequent collaborator Donald W. Roberts. He was a Class IV finalist for the 2022 Cozzarelli Prize from the National Academy of Sciences.

== Selected bibliography ==
- Hajek, Ann E.; St. Leger, Raymond J. (1994). "Interactions Between Fungal Pathogens and Insect Hosts". Annual Review of Entomology. 39 (1). Annual Reviews: 293–322. doi:10.1146/annurev.en.39.010194.001453. ISSN 0066-4170.
- Fang, Weiguo; Azimzadeh, Philippe; St. Leger, Raymond J. (2012). "Strain improvement of fungal insecticides for controlling insect pests and vector-borne diseases". Current Opinion in Microbiology. 15 (3). Elsevier: 232–238. doi:10.1016/j.mib.2011.12.012. ISSN 1369-5274. PMID 22245564.
- Pant, Binod; Bilgo, Etienne; Mitra, Arnaja; Safdar, Salman; Diabaté, Abdoulaye; Leger, Raymond St.; Gumel, Abba B. (2026). "Could malaria mosquitoes be controlled by periodic releases of transgenic mosquitocidal Metarhizium pingshaense fungus? A mathematical modeling approach". Applied Mathematical Modelling. 152 116540. bioRxiv 10.1101/2025.05.28.656721. doi:10.1016/j.apm.2025.116540.
