= Angela E. Douglas =

British entomologist

- Born: Angela Elizabeth Douglas; 1956 (age 69–70)
- Education: University of Oxford (BA); University of Aberdeen (PhD)
- Scientific career
- Fields: Entomology
- Workplaces: University of Oxford; University of York; Cornell University

Angela Elizabeth Douglas (born 1956) is a British entomologist who researches insect nutrition, and is known for her research on symbiotic relationships between insects and microorganisms. She has been the Daljit S. and Elaine Sarkaria Professor of Insect Physiology and Toxicology at Cornell University, Ithaca, New York, since 2008, and previously held a chair at the University of York (2003–8).

== Biography ==
Douglas gained her BA in zoology from the University of Oxford (1978) and her PhD from the University of Aberdeen (1981). She held postdoctoral positions at the University of Oxford (1981–85) and the University of East Anglia (1985–86). She then held a Royal Society research fellowship (1986–96), researching at the John Innes Institute (1986–87) and the University of Oxford (1987–92), before joining the University of York in 1992. She remained at York, serving successively as senior lecturer (1996–99) and reader (1999–2003), before being appointed to a personal chair at the university in 2003. She moved to the United States in 2008, becoming the Daljit S. and Elaine Sarkaria Professor of Insect Physiology and Toxicology at Cornell University.

Her research is on the relationships between animals and their symbiotic microbes. Her earliest papers were on the Roscoff worm, a flatworm that has a symbiotic relationship with algae. Her subsequent work has mainly focused on symbioses between insects and bacteria. A major focus since the mid-1980s has been the question of how insects that feed exclusively on plant phloem, such as aphids, survive even though their food source lacks essential nutrients. She was the first to prove that the aphids receive essential amino acids from symbiotic bacteria. Her group also researches gut microbiota in Drosophila.

Douglas is an elected fellow of the Royal Entomological Society and the Entomological Society of America (2011), and won the latter's Recognition Award in Insect Physiology, Biochemistry, and Toxicology in 2015. She also won Kiel University's inaugural Karl August Möbius Fellowship in 2017. She has written several books, including The Symbiotic Habit (2010), and is the co-editor with Stephen J. Simpson of the fifth edition of R. F. Chapman's The Insects: Structure and Function. She was the editor of the Annual Review of Entomology (2019–21).

== Selected publications ==
Books

- Angela E. Douglas, Fundamentals of Microbiome Science (Princeton University Press; 2018)
- R. F. Chapman, The Insects: Structure and Function, 5th edn, Stephen J. Simpson, Angela E. Douglas (eds), (Cambridge University Press; 2013) (ISBN 978-0-521-11389-2)
- Angela E. Douglas, The Symbiotic Habit (Princeton University Press; 2010)
- Angela E. Douglas, Symbiotic Interactions (Oxford University Press; 1994)

Reviews

- A. E. Douglas (2003), "Coral bleaching—how and why?", Marine Pollution Bulletin, 46 (4): 385–92, Bibcode:2003MarPB..46..385D, doi:10.1016/S0025-326X(03)00037-7, PMID 12705909
- A. E. Douglas (1988), "Nutritional interactions in insect–microbial symbioses: Aphids and their symbiotic bacteria Buchnera", Annual Review of Entomology, 43: 17–37, doi:10.1146/annurev.ento.43.1.17, PMID 15012383

Research papers

- Chun Nin Adam Wong; Patrick Ng; Angela E. Douglas (2011), "Low‐diversity bacterial community in the gut of the fruitfly Drosophila melanogaster", Environmental Microbiology, 13 (7): 1889–900, doi:10.1111/j.1462-2920.2011.02511.x, PMC 3495270, PMID 21631690
- A. E. Douglas (1993), "The nutritional quality of phloem sap utilized by natural aphid populations", Ecological Entomology, 18: 31–38, doi:10.1111/j.1365-2311.1993.tb01076.x, S2CID 84640752
