= Matthew B. Thomas =

British-American ecologist

Matthew (Matt) B. Thomas (born in the United Kingdom) is an ecology professor and Huck Scholar in the Entomology Department at Pennsylvania State University in the United States. He is also affiliated with the Center for Infectious Disease Dynamics at Penn State.

== Education and academic positions ==
- B.Sc. at the University College Cardiff
- Ph.D. University of Southampton
- Postdoc and Research Fellow at Imperial College
- CSIRO Entomology in Australia

== Research ==
Thomas has published nearly 200 peer-reviewed articles on the ecology and evolution of host-pathogen interactions and effects of climate, especially temperature variability, which have been collectively cited over 13,000 times. Thomas developed the novel malaria control tool the "eave tube", with a $10.2 million Bill & Melinda Gates Foundation grant. Eave tubes are being installed in homes in 40 villages in the Ivory Coast (Boake in Côte d'Ivoire) for the purpose of testing whether they are effective in preventing malaria by killing mosquitoes when mosquito try to enter homes and come into contact with treated netting in the eave tubes.

== Awards and recognition ==
- 2016 Elected as a Fellow of the Entomological Society of America (ESA)
- 2012 Elected as a Fellow of the American Association for the Advancement of Science (AAAS)
