= Dipterists Society =

Dipterists Society logo

The Dipterists Society, formerly known as the North American Dipterists Society, is an international society for dipterists, who study flies. The society was informally established in the late 1980s, but incorporated itself in California in 2019, and registered as a 501(c)(3) nonprofit organization. The society took its current name in 2023.

The society is currently directed by Stephen D. Gaimari, Martin Hauser, Christopher J. Borkent, and Jessica Gillung.

== Publications ==
=== Fly Times ===
The society publishes the Fly Times and Fly Times Supplement newsletters.

=== Myia ===
Myia an is irregular book series established in 1979 by Paul H. Arnaud Jr. The first six volumes were produced and distributed by Arnaud, and was sponsored by the California Academy of Sciences. Volumes 7 and 8 are incomplete. From volume 9 onwards, the journal became affiliated with the Dipterist Society.

=== The Tachinid Times ===
The Tachinid Times is hosted on the 'Tachinidae Resources' web pages of the former website of the North American Dipterists Society (NADS).

== Meetings ==
The society conducts its annual meetings during the Entomological Society of America annual meetings. It also conducts field meetings every two years.
