= Victoria Lieu =

Chinese entomologist

Kuin Ok Victoria Lieu (劉君謬) was a Chinese entomologist known for her studies of Aegeriidae (mulberry borers) and Cerambycidae (citrus borers). The beetle Anaesthetobrium lieuae is named after her. Lieu has been published under and referred to by several names including K. O. Victoria Lieu, K.O.V. Lieu, and Chün-ao Liu.

== Life and career ==
K.O.V. Lieu grew up in and began her career in China. Before becoming an entomologist, she was a teacher of various subjects for thirteen years. During her time as an educator in China, she founded the Shang Kuin girls' junior school in Beijing where served as both the principal and as a teacher for six years.After becoming interested in the field of entomology, Lieu spent fourteen years researching wood-boring insects in China. During her study, she spent one year working at the Imperial Forest Research Institute after the Indian government invited her to study the immature stages of borers at the institute.

In the 1933 journal publication External morphology and internal anatomy of the lantern-fly, Lycorma delicatula White, Lieu mentions her mother had recently died, thanking "Mr. Y. T. Mao" for assisting her during "her absence from the laboratory for the passing of her mother." In the same article, it is noted that during the time of publication (1933/1934), Lieu had submitted a thesis to the Department of Biology of the College of Natural Sciences of Yenching University, as required to fulfill the requirements for a Bachelor of Science degree. She also thanked Professor Chenfu Francis Wu, fellow Chinese entomologist, for his supervision. Wu (胡经甫) was a leader of the biology department at Yenching University and has been referred to as "the founder of modern entomotaxonomy in China."

In 1947, during the Second Sino-Japanese War, which caused destruction to many laboratories and academic resources in China, Lieu applied to the Ohio State University for a research scholarship in hopes of continuing her research. She won the Muellhaupt postdoctoral scholarship, and moved to the United States that year. On October 1, 1947, Lieu presented at a general meeting of the Royal Entomological Society of London. In the record of the meeting, Lieu was listed as Dr. K. O. Victoria Lieu. Several months later, Lieu spoke on destructive wood borers at the annual meeting of the Society of Systematic Zoologists in Philadelphia in December. While attending Ohio State in 1948, Lieu was initiated into the national scientific honor society Sigma Xi.

On December 1, 1950, Lieu joined the department of entomology at Kansas State College (now Kansas State University) on a full-time research grant from a Department of State fund for Chinese scholars. Her intended research was reported to be on stored grain insects. Lieu was a member of the Entomological Society of America as of September 1955.

== Publications ==
- External morphology and internal anatomy of the lantern-fly, Lycorma delicatula White, 1933
  - Chinese title: 光蟬之形態與解剖
- Miscellaneous Notes on some Insects studied for Interest. I. An Apricot Pest and its Parasite.(An Eucleid and a Tachinid.), 1934
- Study of a New Species of Chinese Mulberry Borer, Paradoxecia pieli n. sp. (Lepidoptera, Aegeriidae), 1935
- A Preliminary Note on the Colydiid Parasite of a Willow-Branch Cerambycid, 1944
- The Study of Wood Borers in China: I Biology and Control of the Citrus-Root-Cerambycids, Melanauster chinesis, Forster (Coleopetera), 1945
- The Study of Wood Borers in China. II. Biology and control of the citrus-trunk cerambycids, Nadezhdiella cantori (Hope) (Coleoptera), 1947
