= Diane Ullman =

American entomologist

Diane Ella Ullman
- Education: University of California Davis
- Scientific career
- Thesis: The sensory systems and feeding behavior of the pear psylla, Psylla pyricola Foerster (Homoptera : Psyllidae) (1985)

Diane E. Ullman is an entomologist known for her work on managing insect-transmitted plant pathogens. She was elected a fellow of the American Association for the Advancement of Science in 2014. As of 2024 she is Distinguished Professor Emerita of Entomology at the University of California, Davis.

== Education and career ==
Ullman started her education by attending the University of Arizona and receiving her B.S. in horticulture in 1976. After earning her B.S. she enrolled at the University of California Davis and completed the Entomology Ph.D. program in 1985. She then relocated to Honolulu, Hawaii to further her academic career by teaching and working at the University of Hawaii, Honolulu. After eight years of being at the University of Hawaii, she then moved to work at University of California Davis to resume teaching as a professor in the Department of Entomology. Ullman retired in 2024, and as of 2024 holds a position as a distinguished professor at the University of California, Davis

== Research ==
Ullman is known for her research that revolves around an insect called a thrip and the orthotospoviruses that thrips can transmit to crop plants. An example of a virus she has worked with is the Tomato spotted wilt orthotospovirus (TSWV) which is transmitted by western flower thrips. She has also examined insect pathogens and how plants in the nightshade are affected like potatoes and tomatoes.

== Awards and honors ==
Ullman was elected a fellow of the Entomological Society of America in 2011, and elected a fellow of the American Association for the Advancement of Science in 2014.
