= Pius XI Medal =

Science award

The Pius XI Medal is an award presented every second year by the Pontifical Academy of Sciences to a promising scientist under the age of 45.

== Winners of the Pius XI Medal (1939-2020) ==
- 1939 Corneille Heymans (Belgium) Physiology
- 1942 Harlow Shapley (United States) Astronomy
- 1943 Emmanuel de Margerie (France) Geography
- 1962 Bengt E. Andersson (Sweden) Life Sciences
- 1963 Aage Bohr (Denmark) Physics
- 1964 François Gros (France) Life Sciences
- 1966 Allan Sandage (USA) Astronomy
- 1969 Robert Burns Woodward (USA) Chemistry
- 1970 Haruo Kanatani (Japan) Life Sciences
- 1972 György Némethy (Hungary) Physics
- 1975 Stephen W. Hawking (UK) Astronomy
- 1976 Lucio Luzzatto (Italy) Life Sciences
- 1979 Antonio Paes de Carvalho (Brazil) Life Sciences
- 1981 Jean-Marie Lehn (France) Chemistry
- 1983 Gerardus t'Hooft (Netherlands) Physics
- 1986 Elizabeth Bernays (Australia) Life Sciences
- 1988 Luis Caffarelli (Argentina) Mathematics
- 1992 Adi Shamir (Israel) Other Disciplines
- 1996 Mark M. Davis (USA) Chemistry
- 2000 Gillian Bates (UK) Life Sciences
- 2000 Stephen W. Davies (UK) Life Sciences
- 2002 Stanislas Dehaene (France) Life Sciences
- 2002 Juan M. Maldacena (Argentina) Physics
- 2004 Laure Saint-Raymond (France) Mathematics
- 2006 Ashoke Sen (India) Physics
- 2008 Juan A. Larraín (Chile) Life Sciences
- 2010 Patrick Mehlen (France) Biology
- 2012 Trees-Juen Chuang (Taiwan) Genomics
- 2012 Ulrich Pöschl (Austria) Chemistry
- 2014 Cédric Villani (France) Mathematics
- 2016 Mariano Sigman (Argentina) Neurosciences
- 2018 Noble Ephraim Banadda (Uganda), David M. Sabatini (USA/Argentina) and Miriam Serena Vitiello (Italia)
- 2020 Demis Hassabis (UK) Computer Science, Peter Scholze (Germany) Mathematics
- 2026 Karin Öberg (USA) Astrochemistry
