= Myron P. Zalucki =

Australian entomologist

Myron Philip Zalucki
- Born: May 26, 1954 (age 72); Canberra, Australia
- Education: Australian National University, Griffith University
- Scientific career
- Fields: Entomology
- Workplaces: University of Queensland
- Website: biological-sciences.uq.edu.au/profile/489/myron-zalucki

Myron P. Zalucki (pronounced Meron; born 26 May 1954) is an Australian professor emeritus of entomology at the University of Queensland (UQ). Zalucki is a Fellow of the Entomological Society of America, a member and secretary of the Council of the International Congresses of Entomology, and has been a co-editor of the Annual Review of Entomology.

== Early life and education ==
Myron Philip Zalucki was born on 26 May 1954 in Canberra, Australia.

Zalucki attended Australian National University (ANU) in Canberra, Australia, receiving his B.Sc. (first class honours) in zoology in 1976. He then attended Griffith University in Brisbane, Australia, earning his Ph.D. in ecology in 1982.

== Career ==
Zalucki joined the Department of Entomology at the University of Queensland (UQ) with a temporary position in 1981. He reached the rank of full professor in the School of Biological Sciences at the University of Queensland in 2001.

== Research ==
Zalucki is internationally recognized for his work on insect-plant interactions, primarily in members of the order Lepidoptera including monarch butterflies (Danaus plexippus) and pests such as Helicoverpa armigera in the family Noctuidae, and Diamondback moth (Plutella xylostella). He has also studied fruit flies. His laboratory carries out field research and laboratory experiments to better understand the ecology of insects.

As an insect ecologist he uses ecosystem models such as ecological niche modelling to understand and predict the behavior of insect populations as an ecological system, and the underlying processes that influence them. He often uses Monarch butterflies and milkweed as a model study system.

Zalucki explores issues such as the spatial characteristics of milkweed planting and their impact on monarch butterfly movement and egg-laying; the influence of weather patterns on migration; and the impact of spatial-temporal climatic variability. He is known for incorporating movement patterns and behavior into agent-based models. Zalucki has also studied oviposition behaviour and the interactions of oviposition, landscape characteristics, climate, and learning, with caterpillar survival, insect abundance and species distribution.

== Awards ==
- 2018. Fellow of the Entomological Society of America
- 1996, Ian MacKerras Medal for excellence in Entomology, Australian Entomological Society
