= Christina Grozinger =

American entomologist

- Born: Christina M. Grozinger; 1975 (age 50–51); Montreal, Canada
- Education: McGill University
- Scientific career
- Fields: Entomology
- Workplaces: Pennsylvania State University
- Website: www.grozingerlab.com

External videos
- “Virtual Speaking Session featuring Dr. Christina Grozinger—Pollinators in Pennsylvania", June 1, 2020, Penn State Alumni Association

Christina Grozinger is an American entomologist, the Publius Vergilius Maro Professor of Entomology at Pennsylvania State University and the director at its Center for Pollinator Research.

Her main areas of expertise as a social insect biologist are the molecular, physiological, and ecological determinants that affect the health of honey bees and other pollinators. Grozinger has carried out important research into the ways in which bee stressors affect bees, and how factors such as climate change, extreme weather, pathogens, parasites, pesticides, and nutritional deficiencies are affecting worldwide pollinator decline. In 2021, she received the National Academy of Sciences Prize in Food & Agriculture Sciences for her work.

Grozinger has published over 100 peer-reviewed articles that have been cited over 1000 times. She is the Principal investigator at the Grozinger Lab, which has trained 45 undergraduates, 15 Ph.D. students, 6 M.Sc. graduate students, and 13 post-doctoral scholars. As of 2022, she became co-editor of the Annual Review of Entomology.

== Early life and education ==
Grozinger was born in 1975 in Montreal, Canada. Her family emigrated to the United States in 1978, where she lived until she went back to Canada in 1993 to study at McGill University. She graduated with a Bachelor of Science from McGill University in 1997. She then attended Harvard University and obtained a masters and Ph.D. in chemical Biology in 1999 and 2001 respectively.

== Career ==
After obtaining her Ph.D., Grozinger became a fellow at the Beckman Institute for Advanced Science and Technology. She joined Gene E. Robinson's honey bee research lab which helped to develop her interest in honey bee behavior. She spent her time examining the neurogenic basis of pheromone-mediated behavior.

In 2004, she joined the Department of Entomology and Genetics at North Carolina State University as an assistant professor.

In 2008 Grozinger joined the Department of Entomology at Pennsylvania State University. She worked her way up from associate professor to professor (2013), to distinguished Professor (2015). She became the Director of the Center for Pollinator Research in 2009.

== Research ==
Grozinger's research focuses the biology of honey bees and other social insects, in particular mechanisms underlying the social behavior and health of managed and wild bees. She draws on various disciplines including genomics, physiology, neurobiology, and chemical ecology to study the molecular, physiological, and ecological influences on bee health.

Globally declining bee populations threaten agricultural production and food security. In the United States, beekeepers reported that they lost 45 percent of colonies in the year from April 2020 to April 2021. Factors involved in population decline are complex and interrelated.

One of the areas Grozinger has studied is nutrition. Her group has determined that bee's resilience against diseases and pesticides is improved if they have access to high quality nutritional resources from multiple sources. Understanding bees’ nutritional needs is an important step towards pollinator habitat restoration and the improvement of beekeeping practices. Grozinger's group is screening flowering plant species for those that best support bee nutritional needs. Grozinger recommends strategies for floral planting in a variety of landscapes to improve pollinator nutrition, and provides support tools for work in agriculture, conservation, and community settings.

Assessing an area from the viewpoint of research-based bee nutrition makes it possible to create "ecologically functional landscapes". Bees benefit from a diverse plant community, in part because they show preferences for different plants throughout the growing season. Overall, perennial cultivars and native species tend to be preferable to annual cultivars. Cultivars can vary widely in their ability to support pollinators, in part because in breeding plants humans have focused on appearance and other factors rather than on pollinator nutrition.

Grozinger's research has also focused on chemical communication and social bee health. She examines genetic and molecular factors in pheromone communication. She has shown that immune challenges can alter the surface chemical profiles of insects, which affect their social interactions and possibly the spread of disease. Her studies show that pheromone production and response can affect outcomes at the colony level.

== Awards ==
- 2021, NAS Prize in Food & Agriculture Sciences, National Academy of Sciences
- 2018, Fellow of the Entomological Society of America
- 2016, Distinguished Professor, Penn State University
- 2016, Alex and Jessie C. Black Award for Excellence in Research in the College of Agricultural Sciences, Penn State University
- 2013, James I. Hambleton Award, Eastern Apicultural Society of North America
- 2009 Harbaugh Faculty Scholars Program Award for Excellence in Teaching & Learning
- 2008, National Science Foundation Early Career Development (CAREER) Award
- 2001, Beckman Fellow, Arnold and Mabel Beckman Foundation
- 1997-2000 National Science Foundation (NSF) Graduate Research Fellowship
