= Carroll N. Smith =

American entomologist

- Born: November 5, 1909; Menlo, Iowa
- Died: November 8, 1992 (aged 83); Gainesville, Florida
- Citizenship: US
- Education: George Washington University
- Partner: Charlotte née Yochels
- Children: 1
- Scientific career
- Fields: Medical entomology
- Institutions: United States Department of Agriculture; World Health Organization

Carroll Newton Smith (November 5, 1909–November 8, 1992) was an American entomologist who worked for the United States Department of Agriculture from 1934–1969, primarily researching insects relevant to human health (medical entomology). He was co-editor of the Annual Review of Entomology from 1972–1977.

== Early life and education ==
Carroll Newton Smith was born on November 5, 1909, in Menlo, Iowa. He was the third of three children born to Pearl née Butler and Ulysses Smith, who worked together as the publishers of the local newspaper the Moravia Union from 1914–1923. He attended George Washington University for his bachelor's, master's, and doctoral degrees (in 1932, 1934, and 1941, respectively).

== Career ==
At age seventeen, Smith was a page for the U. S. Congress. Following the completion of his master's degree in 1934, he accepted a position at the United States Department of Agriculture as a junior entomologist. From 1937–1941 he worked as an associate entomologist and regular entomologist at Martha's Vineyard, where he researched the biology of the American dog tick. From 1941–1946 he worked in Savannah, Georgia researching insect repellents, insecticides, and the behavior of human-biting insects. His next posting was in Orlando, Florida, where he researched the sterilization of insects as a method of pest control. In 1954 he accepted a position at the USDA's Insects Affecting Man and Animals Research Laboratory (IAMAL) in Orlando; he oversaw the lab's move from Orlando to Gainesville in 1963. He remained the director of IAMAL until 1968, at which time he became the director of the Insect Attractants, Behavior and Basic Biology Research Laboratory (IABBBR). From 1963–1969, he worked as an courtesy professor at the University of Florida. He retired from IABBBR and the USDA in 1969, at which point he joined the World Health Organization and accepted a one-year position in India where he worked on mosquito control via sterilization.

He was co-editor of the Annual Review of Entomology from 1972–1977. He also edited several books, including Principles of Insect Chemosterilization, Insect Colonization and Mass Production, and History of Entomology.

== Awards and honors ==
In 1964 he was elected the president of the Entomological Society of America. He received the USDA Superior Service Award in 1968 for his leadership and scientific contributions. He was also awarded the Medal of Honor from the American Mosquito Control Association in 1976.

== Personal life and death ==
Carroll Smith was married to Charlotte née Yochels; they had one daughter together, Alice. Smith died on November 8, 1992, in Gainesville, Florida.
