= Robert Nelson (entomologist) =

American entomologist (1903–1996)

Robert Hale Nelson (1903–1996) was an American entomologist, federal agriculture- and insecticide researcher, and leader within the Entomological Society of America.

== Biography ==
Nelson was born June 13, 1903, on a farm in Bristow, Nebraska. He received a B.S. in 1929 and a M.S. the following year from the University of Nebraska.

Upon finishing his M.S. Nelson, in 1931, Nelson was hired by the USDA's Bureau of Entomology and Plant Quarantine. His entire career was spent at various positions in the USDA, in 1946, being put in charge of insecticide and acaricide screening. Moved in 1953 to USDA's Agricultural Research Service division, specifically ARS's Entomological Research Branch.

During this time Nelson also took further graduate level courses at Iowa State College and Ohio State University.

Starting in 1947, he simultaneously served on the Chemical Specialties Manufacturers Association's Insecticide Scientific Committee.

Nelson held various positions within the ESA, most notably as Executive Secretary from March 14, 1955 – January 16, 1969.

Retired from USDA, but still active within the ESA's administration, Nelson became its president for 1971.

Upon truly retiring in 1972, he and his wife moved to Lanham, Maryland, and in 1987, he was honored with the ESA Eastern Branch's L.O. Howard Distinguished Achievement Award. Later they moved to Mechanicsburg, Pennsylvania, where he died November 8, 1991.

== Legacy ==
The ESA holds an annual symposium series in his honor, the Robert H. Nelson Symposium, founded by Professor Marvin Harris.
