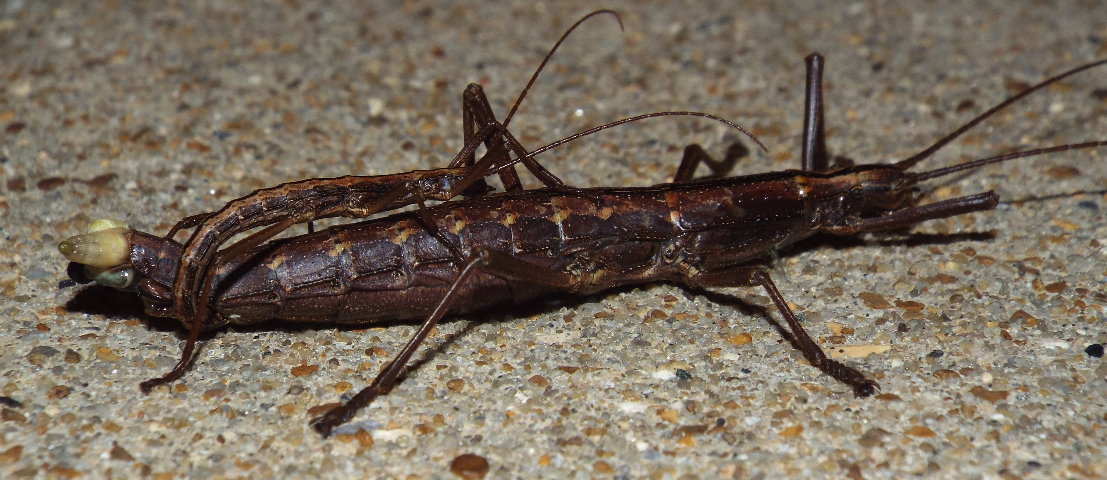

Scientific classification
- Domain: Eukaryota
- Kingdom: Animalia
- Phylum: Arthropoda
- Class: Insecta
- Order: Phasmatodea
- Family: Pseudophasmatidae
- Genus: Anisomorpha
- Species: A. ferruginea

Binomial name
- Anisomorpha ferruginea (Palisot de Beauvois, 1805)

= Anisomorpha ferruginea =

Species of insect

Anisomorpha ferruginea is a species in the family Pseudophasmatidae ("striped walkingsticks"), in the order Phasmatodea ("walkingsticks"). Common names include "northern two-striped walkingstick", "dark walkingstick", and "prairie alligator". Anisomorpha ferruginea is found in North America. This insect can spray a defensive mist that contains a terpene dialdehyde.

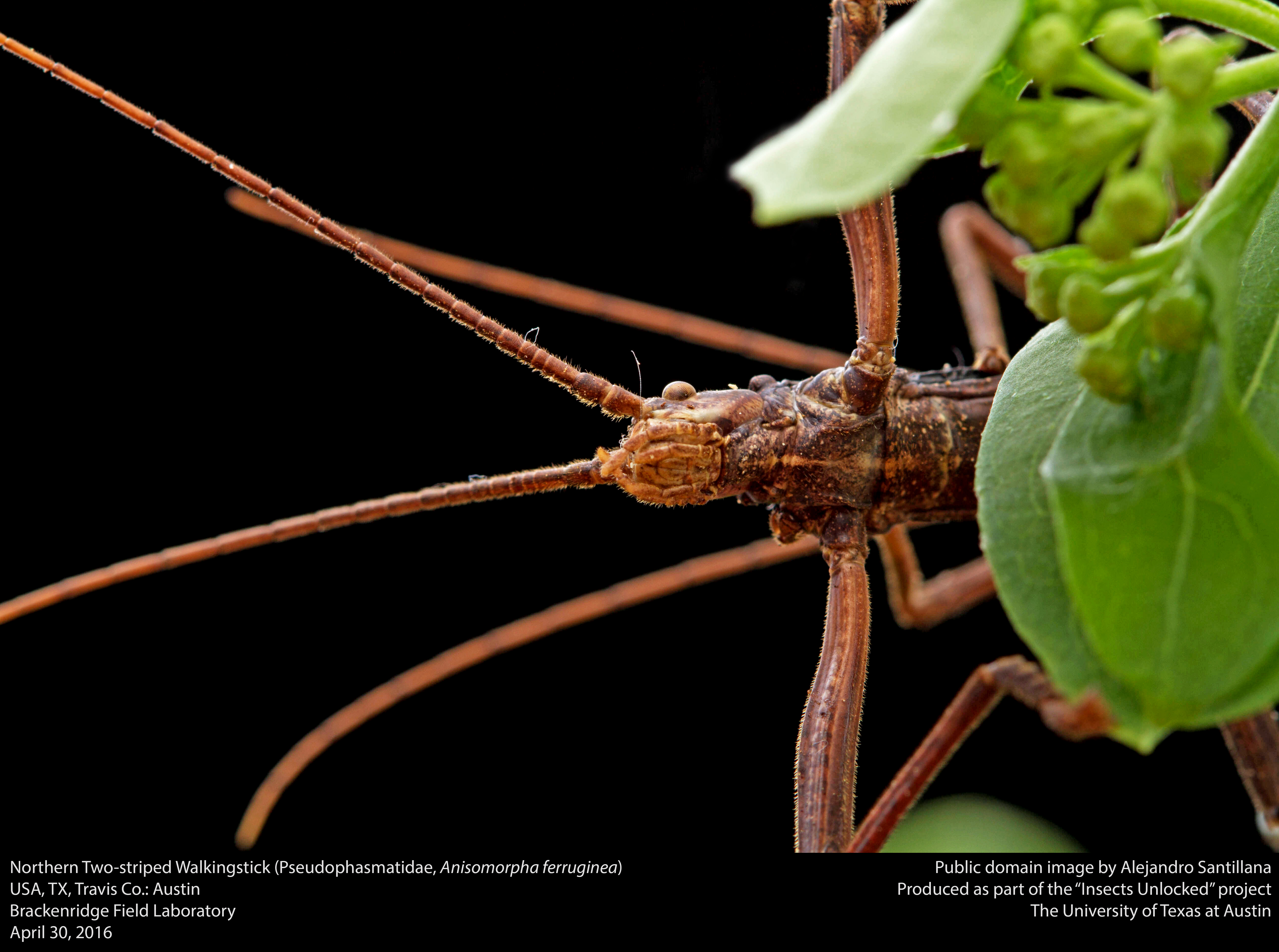

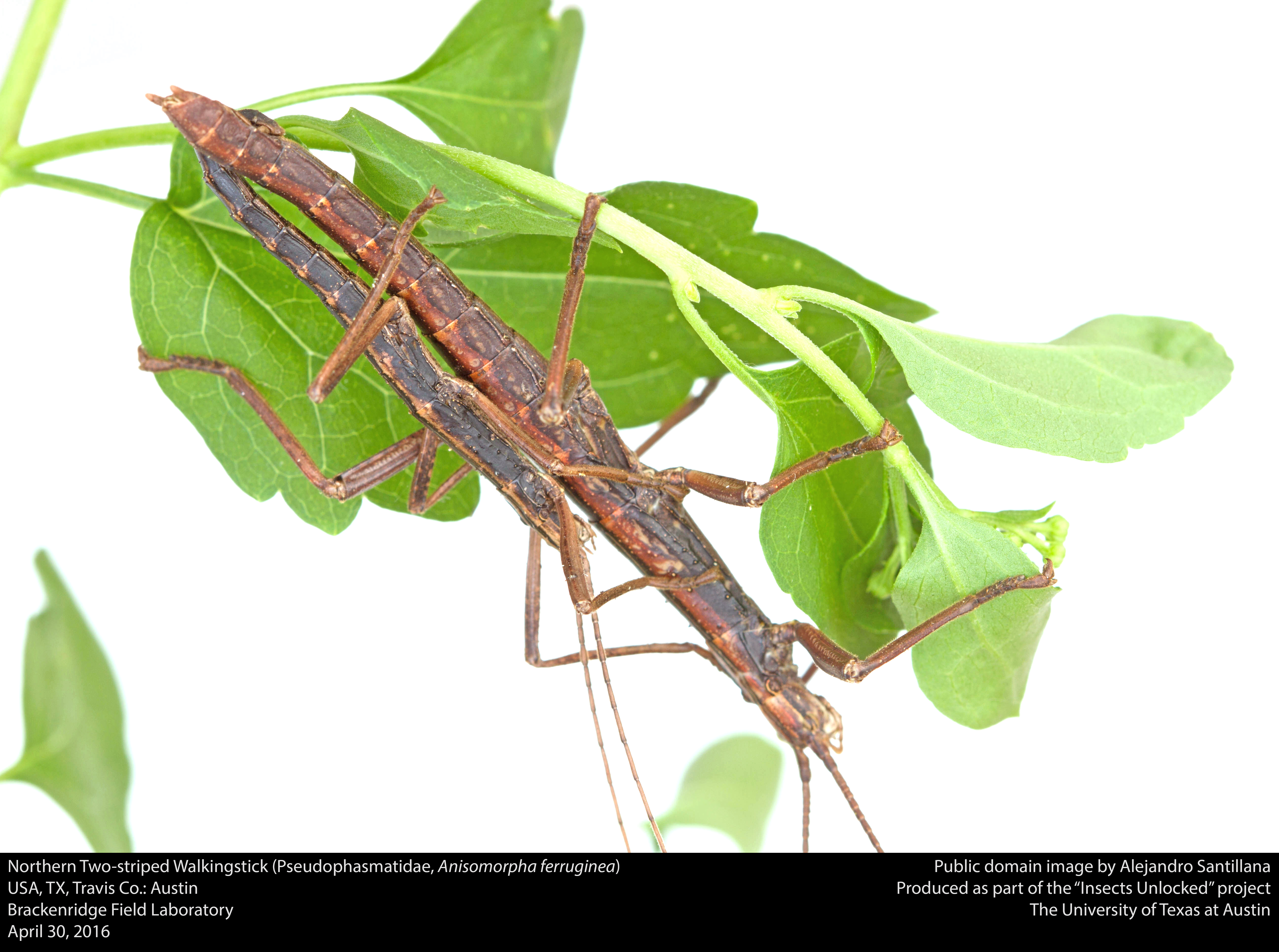
