= Thomas E. Mittler =

Austrian entomologist (1928–2012)

- Born: September 18, 1928; Vienna, Austria
- Died: March 13, 2012 (aged 83)
- Citizenship: Austria
- Education: Imperial College London; University of Cambridge
- Partner: Bergliot "Tutten" née Finsen
- Children: 2
- Scientific career
- Fields: Entomology
- Institutions: University of California, Berkeley
- Thesis: (1955)
- Doctoral advisor: Vincent Wigglesworth

Thomas Eduard Mittler (September 18, 1928–March 13, 2012) was an Austrian entomologist who primarily researched the diets of insects, particularly aphids. He was the editor of the Annual Review of Entomology from 1967–1997.

== Early life and education ==
Thomas Eduard Mittler was born on September 18, 1928, in Vienna, Austria as the second child of parents Anna née Hofmann and Stefan Mittler. In 1938, he fled with his family from Austria to England as a result of the Anschluss, when Austria was annexed into Nazi Germany. In England, he attended Imperial College London, graduating with a bachelor's degree in zoology in 1949. He then attended the University of Cambridge for his PhD under entomologist Vincent Wigglesworth, graduating in 1955. His doctoral research centered on the diet and nutrition of sap-feeding insects, especially aphids.

== Career ==
Upon finishing his PhD, he held temporary positions in London, Canada and Denmark. He accepted a position at the University of California, Berkeley in 1961. At Berkeley he continued his studies of aphid diet; with Reginald Dadd, he defined the first completely chemically defined artificial diets for aphids, based on their previous studies of the chemical composition of sap. He also researched the diet of the Mediterranean fruit fly, a major agricultural pest, as a consultant for the United Nations Food and Agriculture Organization. He remained at Berkeley until his retirement in 1994. He was an editor of the Annual Review of Entomology from 1967–1997. He was also an editor of Entomologia Experimentalis et Applicata for twenty years. Altogether, he published more than 100 scientific papers, including the 1972 text History of Entomology.

== Personal life and death ==
In 1954, he married Bergliot "Tutten" Finsen, who was originally from Denmark. They enjoyed skiing and ice dancing, as well as traveling. They had two children together, John and Eric. He died on March 13, 2012, from a respiratory infection.
