= Journal of Insect Science (Entomological Society of America) =

Peer-reviewed open access scientific journal covering entomology

- Discipline: Entomology
- Language: English
- Edited by: Phyllis Weintraub

Publication details
- History: 2001–present
- Publisher: Oxford University Press
- Open access: Yes
- Impact factor: 1.857 (2020)

Standard abbreviations
- ISO 4: J. Insect Sci.

Indexing
- ISSN: 1536-2442
- OCLC no.: 46820266

Links
- Journal homepage

Journal of Insect Science is a peer-reviewed open access scientific journal covering entomology. It was established in 2001 with support from the University of Arizona by Henry Hagedorn. In 2014, after the death of Henry Hagedorn, the Entomological Society of America assumed responsibility for the journal, and it switched to publishing with Oxford University Press. The editor-in-chief is Phyllis Weintraub.

== Abstracting and indexing ==
The journal is abstracted and indexed in:

- Science Citation Index Expanded
- Current Contents/Agriculture, Biology & Environmental Sciences
- The Zoological Record
- BIOSIS Previews

According to the Journal Citation Reports, the journal has a 2013 impact factor of 0.921.
