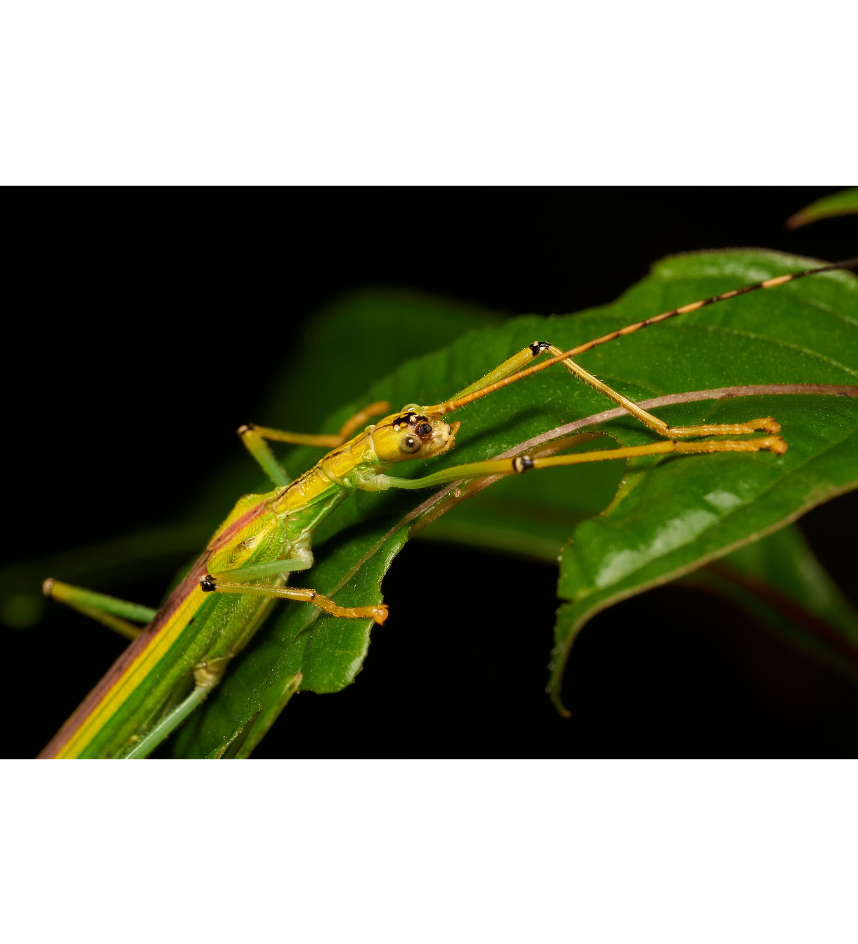
- Anthericonia anketeschke

Scientific classification
- Kingdom: Animalia
- Phylum: Arthropoda
- Class: Insecta
- Order: Phasmatodea
- Family: Pseudophasmatidae
- Subfamily: Stratocleinae
- Tribe: Stratocleini
- Genus: Anthericonia; Zompro, 2004
- Species: A. anketeschke

Binomial name
- Anthericonia anketeschke Zompro, 2004

= Anthericonia =

Genus of stick insects

Anthericonia is a monotypic genus of stick insect of the Pseudophasmatidae family. Its only species is Anthericonia anketeschke, which is found in Costa Rica.

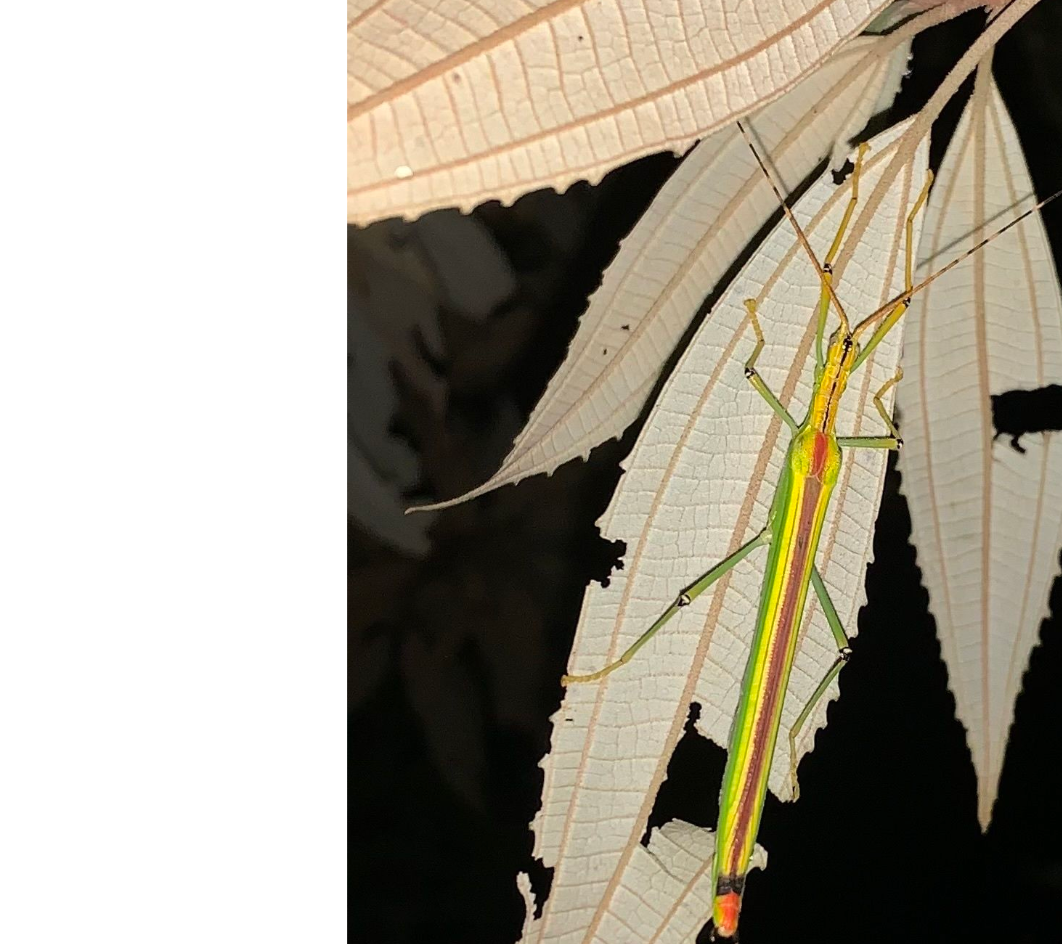
Anthericonia anketeschke on leaf
