= Monticomorpha =

Scientific classification
- Domain: Eukaryota
- Kingdom: Animalia
- Phylum: Arthropoda
- Class: Insecta
- Order: Phasmatodea
- Family: Pseudophasmatidae
- Genus: Monticomorpha; Conle & Hennemann, 2002

Genus of insects

Monticomorpha is a genus of striped walkingsticks in the family Pseudophasmatidae. There are 8 described species in Monticomorpha.

== Species ==
These 8 species belong to the genus Monticomorpha:

- Monticomorpha affinis (Shelford, 1913)
- Monticomorpha bispinosa Conle & Hennemann, 2002
- Monticomorpha boyaca (Conle, Hennemann & Gutiérrez, 2011)
- Monticomorpha flavolimbata (Redtenbacher, 1906)
- Monticomorpha marshallae Conle & Hennemann, 2002
- Monticomorpha roulinii (Goudot, 1843)
- Monticomorpha semele (Westwood, 1859)
- Monticomorpha unicolor (Haan, 1842)
