= Elizabeth Bernays =

Australian entomologist (1940–2024)

Elizabeth A. Bernays (1940 – 5 March 2024) was an Australian entomologist who was a Regents Professor at the University of Arizona. She was known for studies of physiological, behavioural, and ecological interactions between plants, herbivorous insects and their predators. Bernays worked on the feeding behaviour of a variety of insects including aphids, grasshoppers, and hawkmoths. She was known for championing the idea that predation drove many insects to specialise on a few species of hostplants, rather than specialisation being solely the outcome of a chemical arms race between plant and insect herbivores.

== Early life ==
Educated at the University of Queensland, Australia, she moved to London to teach high school students; she subsequently studied for a PhD there. Prior to moving to the University of Arizona, she was a professor at the University of California, Berkeley.

== Career ==
Bernays published more than 100 book chapters, peer-reviewed journal articles, edited volumes and books on a variety of entomological subjects including insect learning, feeding, taste and water homeostasis. Her research into the feeding behaviour of insects helped guide interventions designed to minimise crop pest damage. Along with Michael S. Singer, she published a paper in 2005 in Nature showing that parasitised tiger moth caterpillars have greater sensitivity to pyrrolizidine alkaloids than non-parasitised caterpillars and that parasitised caterpillars seek out plants containing these chemicals to defend themselves from predation and parasitism.

== Academic honours ==
In 1986, she received the Vatican's highest scientific honour, the Pius XI Gold Medal of the Pontifical Academy of Sciences.

== Late career activities ==
After retirement, Bernays studied for a master's degree in creative writing at the University of Arizona. She wrote two memoirs. The first memoir, Six Legs Walking: Notes from an Entomological Live, described her childhood experiences with nature, her work with her husband as an applied entomologist in Africa, and her professional experiences as a woman in science moving from the science culture of the U.K. to a professorship at the University of California, Berkeley. Her second memoir, Across the Divide: The Strangest Love Affair, describes her personal and creative relationship with her wife Linda Hitchcock which included collaborating on children's nature books and travelling the southwestern U.S.

== Personal life ==
She was married to the English entomologist Reginald Frederick Chapman until his death in 2003. She met Linda Hitchcock, photojournalist in 2004 and subsequently married in 2018 .

== Selected books and edited volumes ==
- Herbivores and Plant Tannins with Gillian A. Cooper-Driver and M. Bilgener, London: Academic Press, 1989.
- Insect-Plant Interactions, Boca Raton: CRC Press, 1990.
- Host-Plant Selection by Phytophagous Insects with R.F. Chapman, New York: Chapman & Hall, 1994.
- Six Legs Walking: Notes from an Entomological Life, Florida: Raised Voices Press, 2019.
- Across the Divide: The Strangest Love Affair, Arizona: Wheatmark, 2023.
