= Anaesthetobrium luteipenne =

Scientific classification
- Kingdom: Animalia
- Phylum: Arthropoda
- Class: Insecta
- Order: Coleoptera
- Suborder: Polyphaga
- Infraorder: Cucujiformia
- Family: Cerambycidae
- Genus: Anaesthetobrium
- Species: A. luteipenne

Binomial name
- Anaesthetobrium luteipenne Pic, 1923

Species of beetle

Anaesthetobrium luteipenne is a species of beetle in the family Cerambycidae. It was described by Maurice Pic in 1923. It is known from China and Japan.
