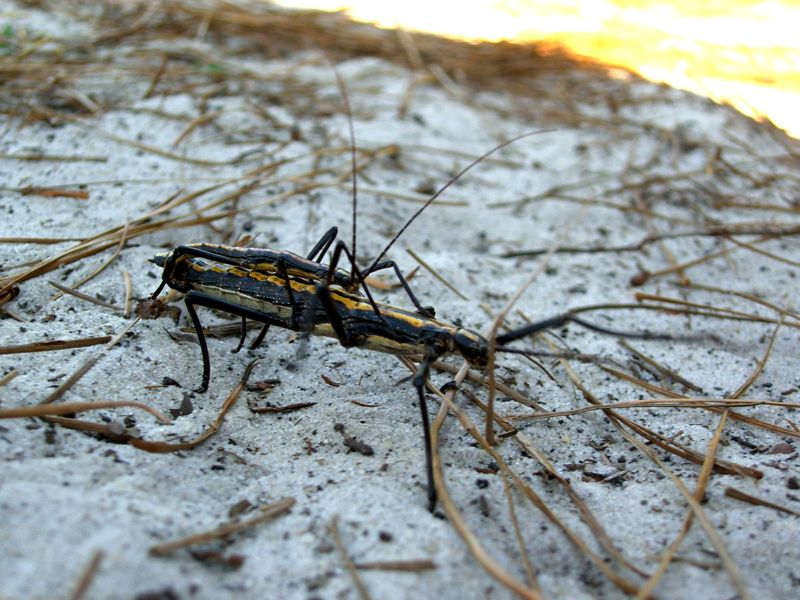
- mating pair of Anisomorpha buprestoides

Scientific classification
- Kingdom: Animalia
- Phylum: Arthropoda
- Clade: Pancrustacea
- Class: Insecta
- Order: Phasmatodea
- Family: Pseudophasmatidae
- Subfamily: Pseudophasmatinae
- Tribe: Anisomorphini
- Genus: Anisomorpha; Gray, 1835

Type species
- Phasma buprestoides Stoll, 1813, design. Kirby, 1904

Species
- A. buprestoides (Stoll, 1813); A. clara Conle, Hennemann & Perez-Gelabert, 2006; A. ferruginea (Palisot de Beauvois, 1805); A. paromalus Westwood, 1859

= Anisomorpha =

Genus of stick insects

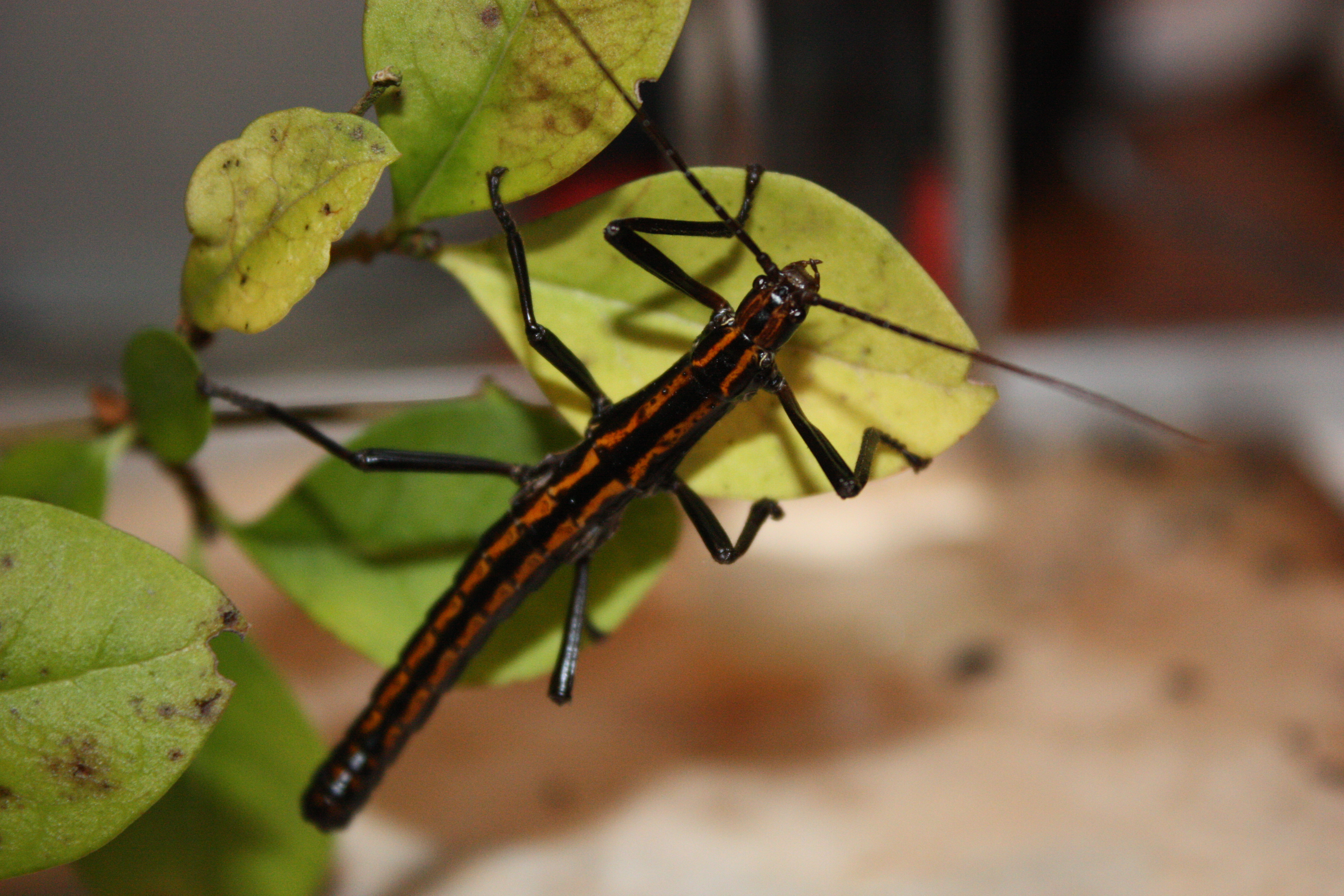
Anisomorpha paromalus (male) - reared in captivity in the UK

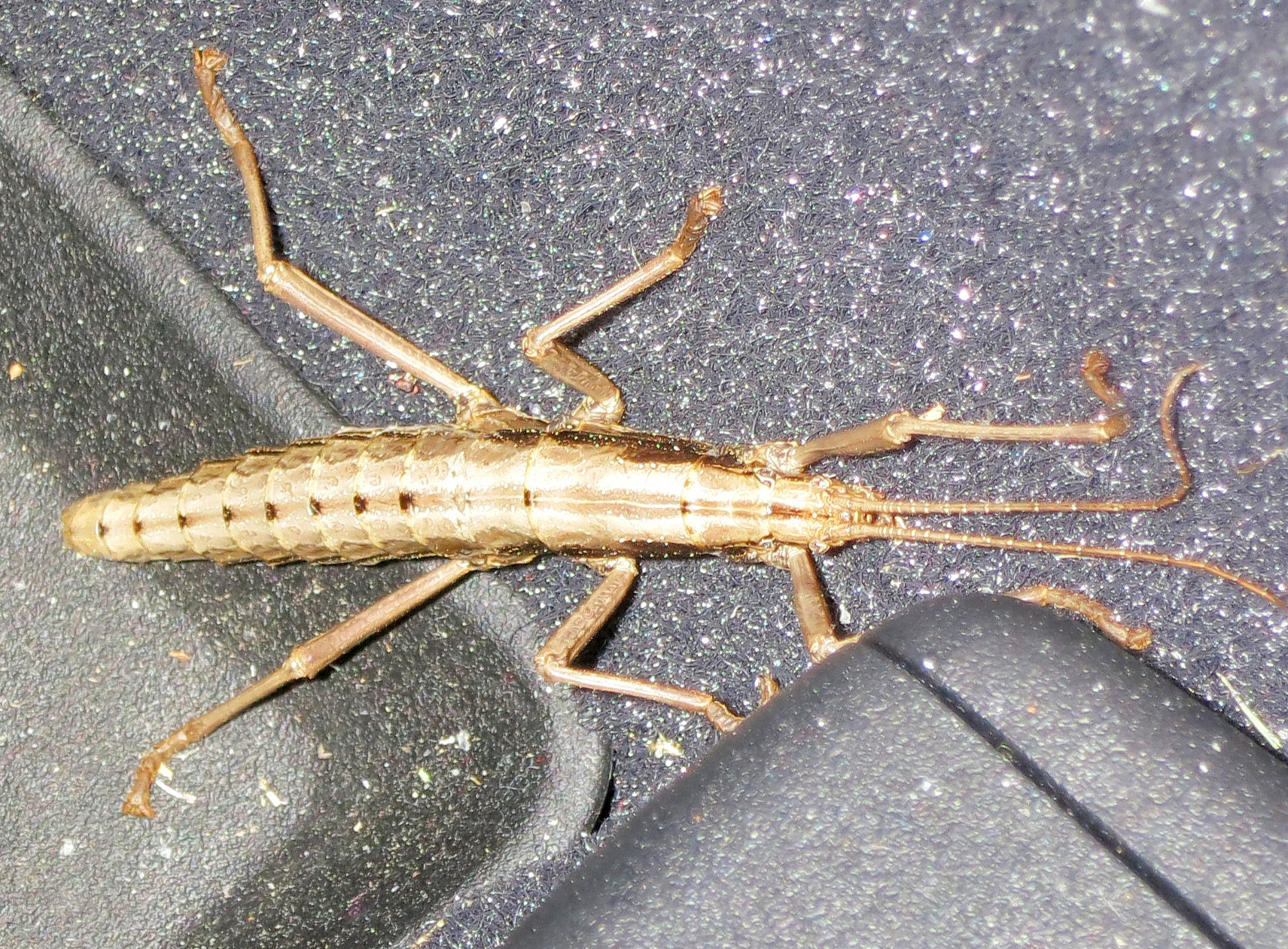
Walking Stick -- Anisomorpha

Anisomorpha is a genus of walking stick insect capable of secreting a substance from glands on the metathorax that can cause an intense burning irritation of the eyes and mouth of potential predators on contact. In some cases, this causes temporary blindness. Species are found throughout the mainland Central, northern South America, and the southeastern United States. The adult female is larger than the male in length and width. There are currently four accepted species in this genus, and all are wingless.
