= Anaesthetobrium fuscoflavum =

Scientific classification
- Domain: Eukaryota
- Kingdom: Animalia
- Phylum: Arthropoda
- Class: Insecta
- Order: Coleoptera
- Suborder: Polyphaga
- Infraorder: Cucujiformia
- Family: Cerambycidae
- Genus: Anaesthetobrium
- Species: A. fuscoflavum

Binomial name
- Anaesthetobrium fuscoflavum (Matsushita, 1933)

Species of beetle

Anaesthetobrium fuscoflavum is a species of beetle in the family Cerambycidae. It was described by Matsushita in 1933. It is known from Taiwan.
