= Ulrich Pöschl =

Austrian chemist

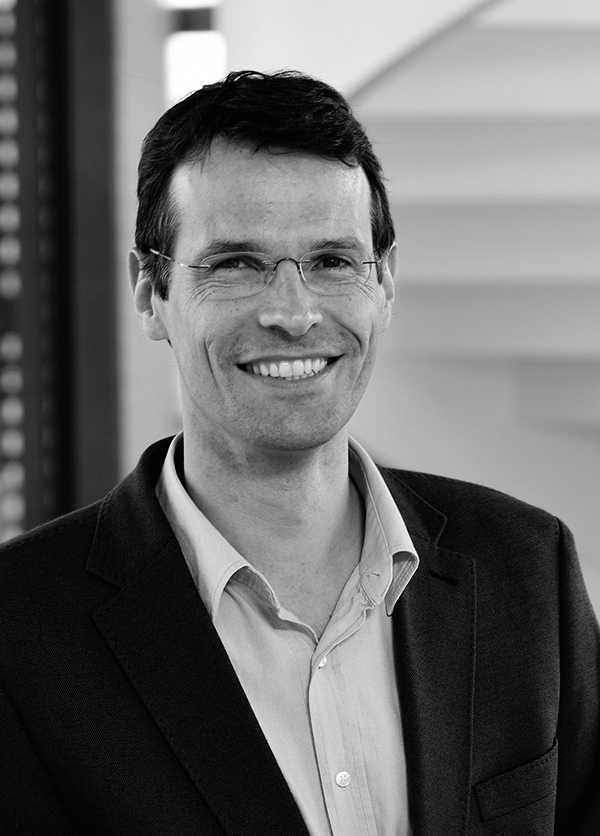
Ulrich Pöschl

Ulrich "Uli" Pöschl (9 October 1969) is an Austrian chemist who was appointed Director of the newly founded Department of Multiphase Chemistry at the Max Planck Institute for Chemistry in Mainz, Germany on 1 October 2012.

== Biography ==
Ulrich Pöschl studied chemistry at the Graz University of Technology in Austria and obtained his PhD in 1995 with Karl Hassler at the Institute of Inorganic Chemistry with a thesis on "Synthesis, Spectroscopy and Structure of selectively functionalized cyclosilanes ". From 1996 to 1997 he worked as a postdoctoral fellow at the Massachusetts Institute of Technology, Cambridge, Massachusetts, in the group of Mario J. Molina in the field of atmospheric chemical kinetics and mass spectrometry of sulfuric acid. In 1997 Pöschl became a research assistant at the Max Planck Institute for Chemistry in the Department of Atmospheric Chemistry and a researcher in the group of Paul Crutzen on the photochemistry of ozone, organic trace gases and stratospheric clouds. From 1999 to 2005 he worked at the Institute for Hydrochemistry of the Munich Technical University, led an independent research group and became a chemistry professor with a thesis on "Carbonaceous Aerosol Composition, Reactivity and Water Interactions". In 2005 he returned to the Max Planck Institute for Chemistry in Mainz and headed a research group in the Department of Biogeochemistry until 2012. Since 2007 Pöschl has also been teaching in the Department of Chemistry, Pharmacy and Earth Sciences at Johannes Gutenberg University in Mainz and habilitated in 2007 in Geochemistry.

== Research ==
The Earth System and climate research are the main focus of the department in the investigation of biological and organic aerosols, aerosol-cloud interactions and atmosphere-surface exchange processes. The food and health sciences area studies how air pollutants cause changes in protein macromolecules and how this affects allergic reactions and diseases. The sequence of multiphase processes at the molecular level and its impact on the macroscopic and global scale is also investigated. The challenge lies in bridging different spatial and temporal scales: from tenths of nanometers to thousands of kilometers and from nanoseconds to years.

Pöschl is also the founder and chief executive editor of Atmospheric Chemistry and Physics (ACP), an open access peer-reviewed scientific journal published by the European Geosciences Union (EGU). Founded in 2001 as the world's first scientific journal with public peer review and discussion, it has become one of the major environmental and earth sciences journal. In addition, he served as a member of the Council of the European Geosciences Union (EGU), as Chair of the Publications Committee (2009–2014) and Division President of Atmospheric Sciences (2003–2007). He is an initiator and co-chair of the international open access initiative OA2020.

== Awards ==
- 1991–1994: Student and research scholarships of the Technical University of Graz, the Pro Scientia Foundation, and the Austrian Science Foundation
- 1996: Graduation “Sub Auspiciis Praesidentis” by the Austrian Federal President (highest award in the Austrian educational system)
- 1996: Research Awards of the Austrian Federal Minister of Arts and Science, the Industrial Union of Carinthia and the Josef Krainer Foundation
- 1996: Schrödinger Scholarship of the Austrian Science Foundation
- 2000: Young Scientist Award of the German Federal Ministry of Education and Research
- 2005: EGU Union Service Award
- 2012: Pius XI Gold Medal of the Pontifical Academy of Sciences for his research on the role of chemistry in the atmosphere, climate and health.
- 2015: Copernicus-Medal of the Copernicus-Gesellschaft
- 2023: Union Fellow, American Geophysical Union (AGU)
- 2014–2025: Highly Cited Researcher, Web of Science
- References
