= Anaesthetobrium =

Scientific classification
- Kingdom: Animalia
- Phylum: Arthropoda
- Class: Insecta
- Order: Coleoptera
- Suborder: Polyphaga
- Infraorder: Cucujiformia
- Family: Cerambycidae
- Tribe: Desmiphorini
- Genus: Anaesthetobrium; Pic, 1923

Genus of beetles

Anaesthetobrium is a genus of longhorn beetles of the subfamily Lamiinae, containing the following species:

- Anaesthetobrium fuscoflavum (Matsushita, 1933)
- Anaesthetobrium javanicum Breuning, 1957
- Anaesthetobrium lieuae Gressitt, 1942
- Anaesthetobrium luteipenne Pic, 1923
