= Nicole Gerardo =

American entomologist

Nicole Marie Gerardo
- Education: Rice University, University of Texas at Austin
- Scientific career
- Institutions: Emory University
- Website: https://scholarblogs.emory.edu/gerardolab/

External videos
- "Farming Ants Reveal Evolution Secrets", Emory University, May 13, 2009

Nicole M. Gerardo is an entomologist and Professor of Biology and Director of the Graduate Division of Biological and Biomedical Sciences (GDBBS) at Emory University in Atlanta, Georgia. She heads the Gerardo Lab and is a co-leader of the Emory Tibet Science Initiative Research Training Program. In 2021, she became editor of the Annual Review of Entomology.

== Early life and education ==
Gerardo earned a B.A. in Ecology and Evolutionary Biology from Rice University in Houston, Texas in 1997; she received her Ph.D. in Integrative Biology from the University of Texas at Austin in Austin, Texas in 2004.

== Career ==
Gerardo's work focuses on evolutionary ecology, in particular the relationships between both beneficial and harmful microbes and their hosts. For example, aphids are supplied with nutrients by beneficial bacteria and may have lowered immunity to ensure that the relationship continues. Her whole-genome analyses of insect species have revealed that the pea aphid appears to have lost the Imd pathway, considered a key immune pathway in many species. Her work on the genetics of insect species has also revealed patterns of immune gene evolution of monarch butterflies. Another of her areas of study involves fungal pathogens, fungus-growing ants and their gardens, which are regarded as a model of symbiosis.

Gerardo has published across several journals and in early 2025, her h-index was 36.

== Awards and honors ==
- 2020, Emory Williams Distinguished Undergraduate Teaching Award, Emory University
