= Anaesthetobrium javanicum =

Scientific classification
- Kingdom: Animalia
- Phylum: Arthropoda
- Clade: Pancrustacea
- Class: Insecta
- Order: Coleoptera
- Suborder: Polyphaga
- Infraorder: Cucujiformia
- Family: Cerambycidae
- Genus: Anaesthetobrium
- Species: A. javanicum

Binomial name
- Anaesthetobrium javanicum Breuning, 1957

Species of beetle

Anaesthetobrium javanicum is a species of beetle in the family Cerambycidae. It was described by Breuning in 1957. It is known from Java.
