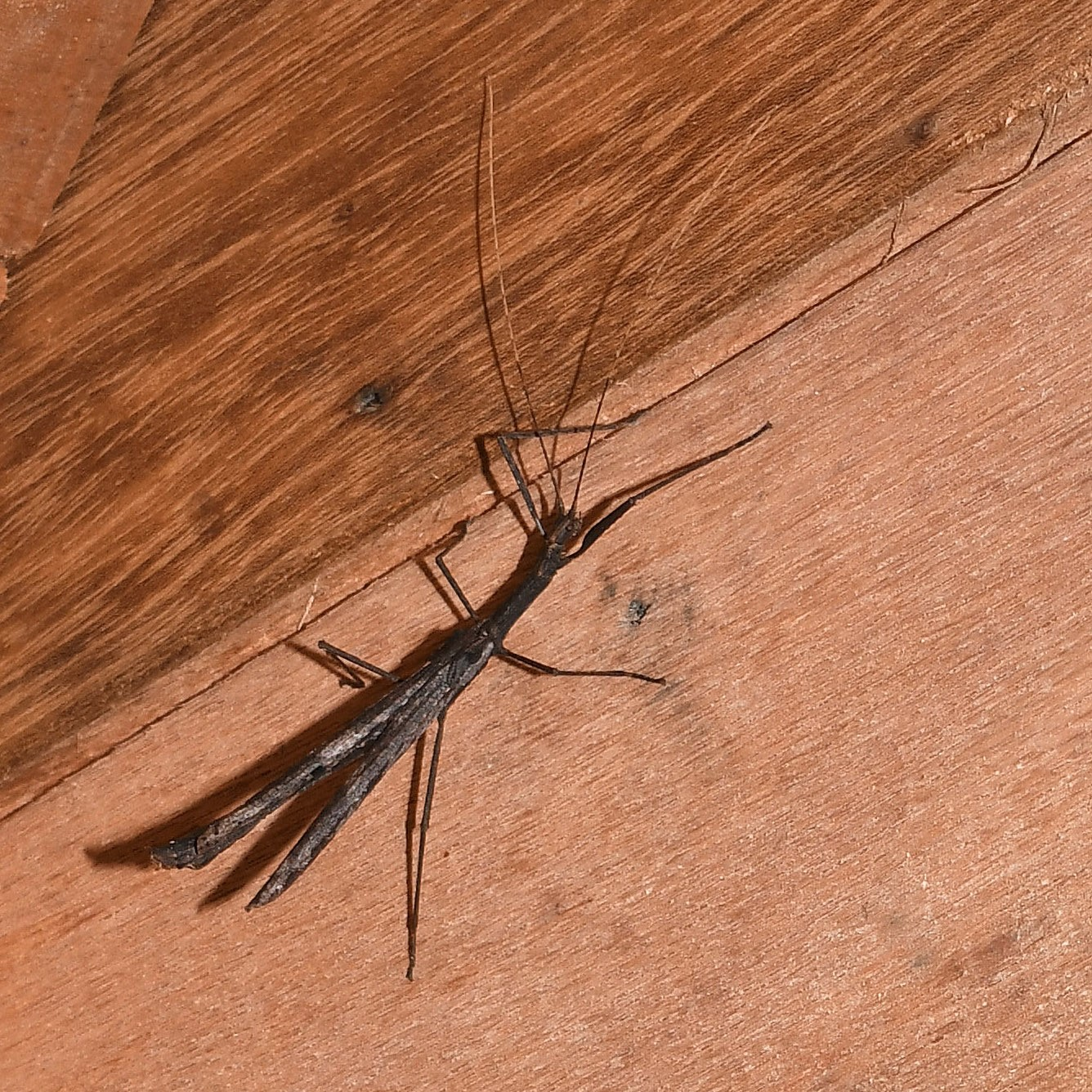

Scientific classification
- Domain: Eukaryota
- Kingdom: Animalia
- Phylum: Arthropoda
- Class: Insecta
- Order: Phasmatodea
- Family: Pseudophasmatidae
- Subfamily: Xerosomatinae
- Tribe: Prexaspini
- Genus: Isagoras; Stål, 1875

= Isagoras (insect) =

Genus of insects

Isagoras is a genus of striped walkingsticks in the family Pseudophasmatidae. There are more than 25 described species in Isagoras.

== Species ==
These 26 species belong to the genus Isagoras:

- Isagoras affinis Chopard, 1911
- Isagoras apolinari Hebard, 1933
- Isagoras aurocaudata Heleodoro & Rafael, 2018
- Isagoras bishopi Rehn, J.A.G., 1947
- Isagoras brevipes Redtenbacher, 1906
- Isagoras chocoensis Hebard, 1921
- Isagoras chopardi Hebard, 1933
- Isagoras dentipes Redtenbacher, 1906
- Isagoras ecuadoricus Hebard, 1933
- Isagoras jurinei (Saussure, 1868)
- Isagoras kheili (Bolívar, 1896)
- Isagoras metricus Rehn, J.A.G., 1947
- Isagoras nitidus Redtenbacher, 1906
- Isagoras paulensis Piza, 1944
- Isagoras phlegyas (Westwood, 1859)
- Isagoras plagiatus Redtenbacher, 1906
- Isagoras proximus Redtenbacher, 1906
- Isagoras rugicollis (Gray, G.R., 1835)
- Isagoras santara (Westwood, 1859)
- Isagoras sauropterus Rehn, J.A.G., 1947
- Isagoras schraderi Rehn, J.A.G., 1947
- Isagoras subaquilus Rehn, J.A.G., 1947
- Isagoras tacanae Günther, 1940
- Isagoras venezuelae Rehn, J.A.G., 1947
- Isagoras venosus (Burmeister, 1838)
- Isagoras vignieri (Redtenbacher, 1906)
