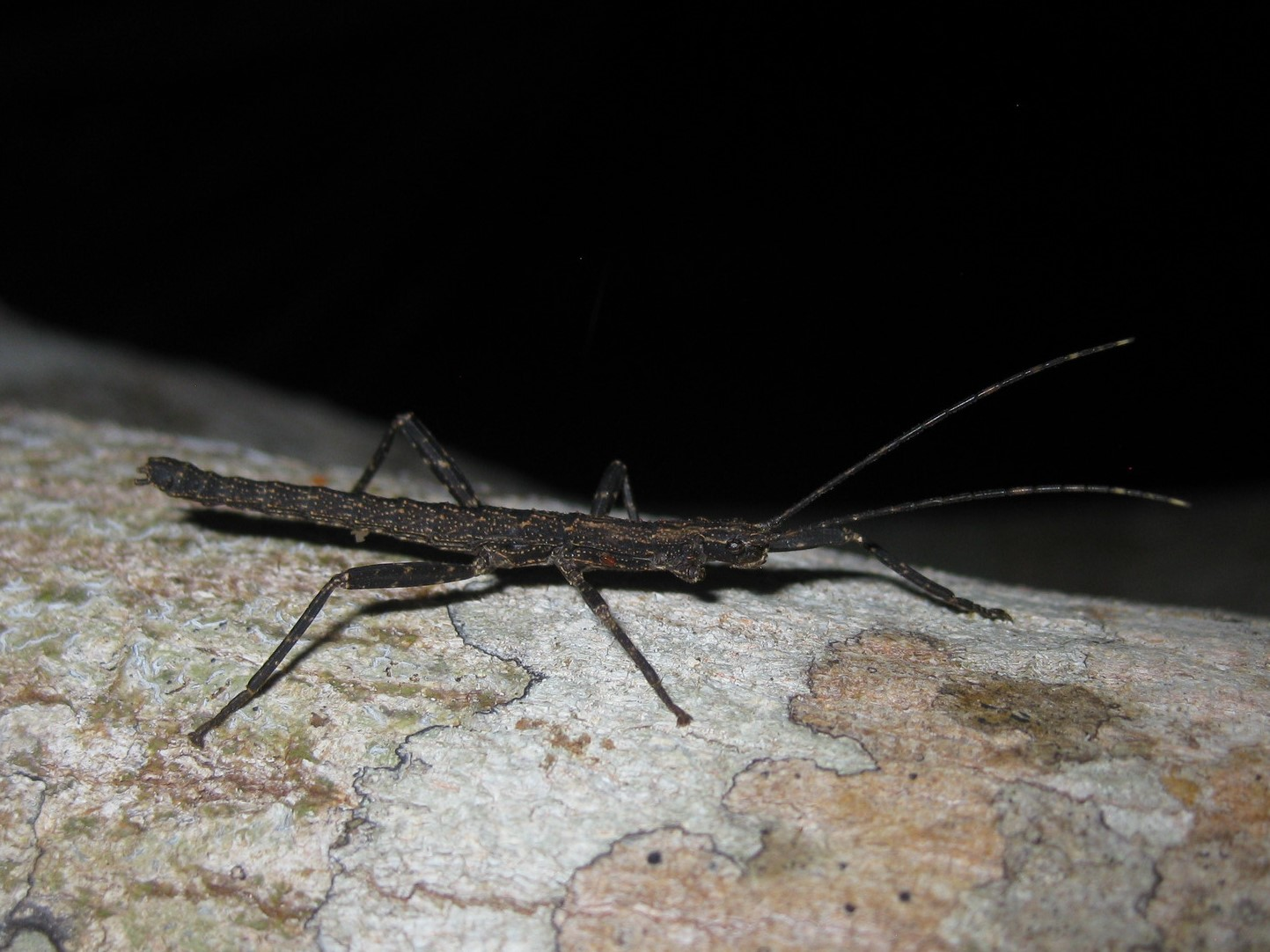

Scientific classification
- Kingdom: Animalia
- Phylum: Arthropoda
- Class: Insecta
- Order: Phasmatodea
- Family: Pseudophasmatidae
- Subfamily: Pseudophasmatinae
- Tribe: Anisomorphini
- Genus: Malacomorpha; Rehn, 1906

= Malacomorpha =

Genus of insects

Malacomorpha is a genus of striped walkingsticks in the family Pseudophasmatidae. There are about 15 described species in the genus Malacomorpha.

== Species ==
The following species are recognised in the genus Malacomorpha:

- Malacomorpha androsensis Rehn & J.A.G., 1906
- Malacomorpha bastardoae Conle, Hennemann & Perez-Gelabert, 2008
- Malacomorpha cancellata (Redtenbacher, 1906)
- Malacomorpha cyllarus (Westwood, 1859)
- Malacomorpha guamuhayaense Zompro & Fritzsche, 2008
- Malacomorpha hispaniola Conle, Hennemann & Perez-Gelabert, 2008
- Malacomorpha jamaicana (Redtenbacher, 1906)
- Malacomorpha longipennis (Redtenbacher, 1906)
- Malacomorpha macaya Conle, Hennemann & Perez-Gelabert, 2008
- Malacomorpha minima Conle, Hennemann & Perez-Gelabert, 2008
- Malacomorpha multipunctata Conle, Hennemann & Perez-Gelabert, 2008
- Malacomorpha obscura Conle, Hennemann & Perez-Gelabert, 2008
- Malacomorpha poeyi (Saussure, 1868)
- Malacomorpha sanchezi Conle, Hennemann & Perez-Gelabert, 2008
- Malacomorpha spinicollis (Burmeister, 1838)
