= Xera (phasmid) =

Scientific classification
- Kingdom: Animalia
- Phylum: Arthropoda
- Class: Insecta
- Order: Phasmatodea
- Family: Pseudophasmatidae
- Subfamily: Xerosomatinae
- Tribe: Xerosomatini
- Genus: Xera; Redtenbacher, 1906

Species
- see text

Genus of stick insects

Xera is a stick insect genus in the family Pseudophasmatidae.

== Species list ==
- Xera apolinari
- Xera debilis
- Xera magdalenae Conle, Hennemann & Gutierréz, 2011 (Colombia: Magdalena)
- Xera tenaense Conle, Hennemann & Gutierréz, 2011 (Colombia: Cundinamarca)
