= Ann Hajek =

American entomologist

- Born: 1952 (age 73–74); San Francisco, California, US
- Education: UC Davis; UC Berkeley
- Scientific career
- Fields: Entomology
- Workplaces: Anhui Agricultural University; University of Copenhagen; Cornell University

Ann E. Hajek is an American entomologist with a focus in insect-microbe interactions. She was a professor of entomology at Cornell University from 1994 to 2024.

== Early life and education ==
Hajek was born in San Francisco, California, in 1952. In the 1970s, she attended University of California, Davis for two years then relocated to the UC Berkeley where she studied and worked as a practicing entomologist and science writer prior to obtaining her Ph.D. in entomology in 1974. While studying at the Division of Biological Control, Hajek earned her M.S. and Ph.D. in 1980 and 1984 respectively.

== Career ==
Following graduation, Hajek moved to Ithaca, New York, where she was hired by the Boyce Thompson Institute as an insect pathologist. She remained there until 1994, when she got a position at the Department of Entomology of Cornell University. While there, Hajek worked through the ranks, obtaining associate in 2000 and full professor of entomology in 2005. During her academic career at Cornell, Hajek ran an active research program in both laboratory and field studies and led as many as 200 people. She has also taught courses at Cornell on invertebrate pathology, symbiosis, biological control, and invasion ecology and graduated as many as two M.S. and 10 Ph.D. students, and was a mentor to 14 postdocs and eight visiting scientists.

From 2008 to 2011 she served as adjunct professor at Anhui Agricultural University in Hefei, China and then was a visiting and honorary Professor of Zoology at the University of Copenhagen. She also is an active member of the Society for Invertebrate Pathology and a speaker at U.S. states and 14 countries.

== Research ==
In 1999, Ann E. Hajek published her study on Entomophaga maimaiga and how it can be used to control the spread of the spongy moth (Lymantria dispar).

In 2019, Prof. Hajek along with fellow scientists from Ohio State University studied spotted lanternfly which is an abundant pest known to damage grape and apple crops in China, Taiwan, and Vietnam and had invaded South Korea and Japan. The species was found in Pennsylvania in 2014 and has spread to 16 neighboring states. Unfortunately, the species has few natural enemies. While studying how the insect feeds on the tree of heaven, Hajek and her team discovered an outbreak of Beauveria bassiana and Batkoa major, two species of native fungal pathogens, which appear to have potential to control the growing populations of lanternflies; Batkoa major killed lanternflies on trees while Beauveria bassiana killed those on the ground, with only a few viable egg masses produced in the fungal outbreak area.

== Personal life ==
Ann Hajek is married to James K. Liebherr, a systematic entomology professor since 1984. They have a daughter, Lisa, who is a lawyer in Seattle, Washington. Their son Jonathan is specializing in spatial analysis and works in Rochester, New York.

== Works ==
Ann Hajek is an author of at least two books and many book chapters. The books that she written are Ecology of Invertebrate Diseases and Natural Enemies while the book chapters that she wrote can be found in the books Advances in Microbial Ecology (titled "Ecology of Terrestrial Fungal Entomopathogens"), as well as her co-authorship with Bernard Papierok on "Chapter V-2 - Fungi: Entomophthorales" in Manual of Techniques in Insect Pathology, a 1997 publication of Academic Press and "Chapter 5: Evaluating Non-target Effects of Pathogens Used for Management of Arthropods" with M.S. Goettel in Evaluating Indirect Ecological Effects of Biological Control.

== Honors ==
- Fellow of the Entomological Society of America (2018)
