= Edward Arthur Steinhaus =

American insect pathologist (1914–1969)

- Born: November 7, 1914; Max
- Died: October 20, 1969; Newport Beach
- Education: North Dakota State University, Ohio State University
- Occupation: Pathologist
- Employers: United States Public Health Service; University of California, Berkeley; University of California, Irvine
- Awards: Guggenheim Fellowship

Edward Arthur Steinhaus (November 7, 1914 – October 20, 1969) was an American bacteriologist and pathologist who specialized in insect pathology particularly on the applications of microorganisms for the control of insect pests. He also served as the founder or cofounder of the Annual Review of Entomology, the Journal of Invertebrate Pathology, and the Society for Invertebrate Pathology.

Steinhaus was born in Max, North Dakota to Alice Rinehart and Arthur Alfred. He studied in Faribault, Minnesota and worked with a printer to produce a private periodical. An interest in microbes was sparked off after reading Paul de Kruif's Microbe Hunter. He joined North Dakota Agricultural College in 1932 with bacteriology as a major and then moved to Ohio State University, receiving a doctorate in 1939.

He worked from 1940 in the US Public Health Service as a bacteriologist in the Rocky Mountain Laboratory, Hamilton, Montana. He joined the University of California, Berkeley in 1944 and taught insect pathology. Steinhaus was the founding editor of the Annual Review of Entomology journal in 1954, and then proposed a Journal of Invertebrate Pathology in 1958. Academic Press accepted that proposal the next year but only if it would be renamed more narrowly as the Journal of Insect Pathology. He moved to the Irvine Campus after 1963 and served as Professor of Pathobiology and First Dean of Biological Sciences. By 1965 it had become clear that Steinhaus's original proposal had been more appropriate, and J Insect Path became the Journal of Invertebrate Pathology. In 1967 he and Albert Sparks cofounded the Society for Invertebrate Pathology and the next year the Society adopted J Invert Path as its official organ. Steinhaus Hall on the UCI campus was named for Steinhaus on May 22, 1970.

== Personal life ==
Steinhaus married Mabry Clark, who was a bacteriologist at Ohio State University, and they had two daughters and a son (Peggy, Tim and Cindy). Steinhaus was a religious Congregationalist who saw no conflict between science and belief.
