= Journal of Invertebrate Pathology =

- Discipline: Invertebrate zoology Pathology
- Language: English
- Edited by: David Shapiro-Ilan

Publication details
- Former name: Journal of Insect Pathology
- History: 1959–present
- Publisher: Academic Press (Elsevier) with help of the Society for Invertebrate Pathology
- Frequency: Triannual
- Open access: After 12 months or immediate with authorship fee
- Impact factor: 2.841 (2020)

Standard abbreviations
- ISO 4: J. Invertebr. Pathol.

Indexing
- CODEN: JIVPAZ
- ISSN: 0022-2011 (print); 1096-0805 (web)
- OCLC no.: 36944733

Links
- Journal homepage

The Journal of Invertebrate Pathology is a peer-reviewed scientific journal publishing research on the induction and pathogenesis of diseases of invertebrates, owned by Academic Press (part of Elsevier). The journal publishes the results of physiological, morphological, genetic, immunological, and ecological studies as related to the etiologic agents of diseases of invertebrates, including the suppression of diseases in beneficial species, and the use of diseases in controlling undesirable species.

It was founded by American microbiologist Edward Arthur Steinhaus in 1959 as the Journal of Insect Pathology, renamed in 1965, and in 1968 adopted as the official journal of the Society for Invertebrate Pathology shortly after it was also founded by Steinhaus.

== See also ==
- Arbovirus
- List of Elsevier periodicals
- List of entomology journals
- List of insect-borne diseases
