= Reginald Frederick Chapman =

American entomologist

Reg Chapman
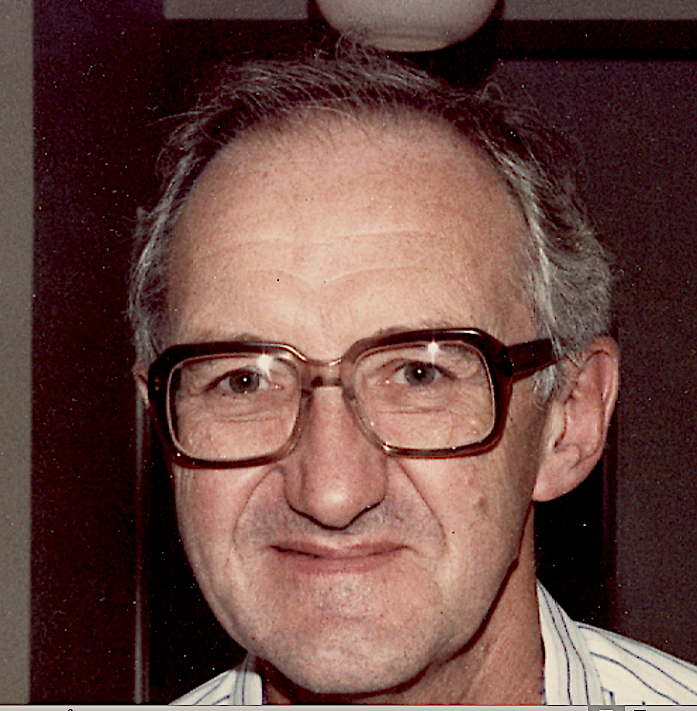
- Chapman in 2000
- Known for: Study of plant-insect interactions
- Scientific career
- Fields: Entomology
- Workplaces: University of Arizona, Tucson

Reginald Frederick Chapman (2 July 1930 – 2 May 2003) was an English entomologist who later worked at the University of Arizona. He wrote a landmark textbook on the anatomy and physiology of insects, The Insects- Structure and Function, several editions of which have been published.

Chapman was born in London and received a bachelor's degree in science from Queen Mary College, London in 1951. After a Ph.D. at Birkbeck College, he joined in 1953, the locust control service in East Africa and from 1957 he worked at the University of Ghana, studying tsetse flies. In 1959 he returned to Birkbeck to teach zoology. In 1969 he published The Insects- Structure and Function which was to go into numerous editions. In 1970 Chapman headed the research division of the Anti-Locust Research Centre and worked for thirteen years after which he moved to University of California, Berkeley before moving to the University of Arizona.

Chapman was married to his student and research colleague Elizabeth Bernays and he had two children from a previous marriage. He died at home in Tucson, Arizona.
