= Miriam Serena Vitiello =

Italian physicist

- Born: Basilicata
- Education: University of Bari
- Scientific career
- Workplaces: Technical University of Delft

Miriam Serena Vitiello is an Italian physicist who is a researcher and professor at CNR NANO, the Istituto Nanoscienze. Her research considers the development and application loof terahertz devices. She was the first woman to win the Italian Physical Society Friedel-Volterra Award.

== Early life and education ==
Vitiello is from Policoro, Basilicata. She was passionate about the humanities and astrophysics when she was at high school. She earned her master's and doctorate in physics at University of Bari. During her university studies, she became more interested in solid state physics and optoelectronics. Her doctorate was part of a joint program with the Massachusetts Institute of Technology. After earning her doctorate, she was a visiting scientist at the Technical University of Delft, LMU Munich and Paris Diderot University. She was made a postdoctoral researcher at Bari in 2006, and moved to the National Research Council Nanoscience Institute in 2010.

== Research and career ==
Vitiello joined the Scuola Normale Superiore in 2015, and was made Director of Research at the National Research Council in 2017. Her research focuses on the realisation of lasers and detectors that operate in the terahertz regime. She is particularly interested in how to apply terahertz devices to quantum technologies.

Vitiello was awarded a European Research Council Consolidator Grant and FIRB "Future in Research" from the Ministry of Education, University and Research. She coordinates the terahertz work in the Graphene Flagship. In 2024, she was supported by the European Research Council to develop far-infrared imaging capabilities. These detectors are based on graphene, with ultra-fast response times, low power consumption, and room temperature operation.

Vitiello has made major breakthroughs in the field of cascade lasers; inventing quasi crystal terahertz systems with record efficiency and frequency combs with record dynamic range. She also demonstrated the first random laser that operated in continuous wave. She has developed several compact, high performance terahertz sources, which can be used for characterisation of advanced materials (e.g. topological insulators and molecular systems). In recognition of her contributions to terahertz science, she was the first woman to earn the Friedel-Volterra Award in 2020.

== Awards and honours ==
- 2012: "Sergio Panizza" Award for Optoelectronics or Photonics
- 2015: Early Career SPIE Award
- 2016: Guido Dorso International Award
- 2018: Sapio Research and Innovation Award
- 2018: Medal of the Pontifical Academy of Sciences
- 2021: Italian Physical Society Friedel-Volterra Prize
- 2025: ERC Proof of Concept Grant
- 2025: SPIE Quantum Sensing Achievement Award
- 2027: Optica Fellow

== Selected publications ==
- Koppens, Frank; T Mueller; Ph Avouris; A C Ferrari; M S Vitiello; M Polini (2014). "Photodetectors based on graphene, other two-dimensional materials and hybrid systems". Nature Nanotechnology. 9 (10): 780–793. doi:10.1038/nnano.2014.215. PMID 25286273. Wikidata Q38257067.
- S S Dhillon; Vitiello, Miriam Serena; Linfield, Edmund; et al. (2017). "The 2017 terahertz science and technology roadmap". Journal of Physics D. 50 (4) 043001. doi:10.1088/1361-6463/50/4/043001. Wikidata Q56331309.
- L Vicarelli; M S Vitiello; D Coquillat; et al. (2012). "Graphene field-effect transistors as room-temperature terahertz detectors". Nature Materials. 11 (10): 865–871. arXiv:1203.3232. doi:10.1038/nmat3417. PMID 22961203. Wikidata Q34409362.
