= Dolichodial =

Names
- IUPAC name 2-Methyl-5-(3-oxo-1-propen-2-yl)cyclopentanecarbaldehyde

Identifiers
CAS Number	60478-52-6 (A); 3671-76-9 (B); 1127-67-9 (C); 5951-57-5 (A'); 1127-66-8 (B'); 864826-30-2 (B, B', C or C')
3D model (JSmol)	Interactive image
ChEBI	CHEBI:4685
ChemSpider	390862
PubChem CID	534263
UNII	1KLH0PK5RS (A); 48D28040JM (B); D08WL9YC5Q (A')
CompTox Dashboard (EPA)	DTXSID00331826
- InChI: InChI=1S/C10H14O2/c1-7-3-4-9(8(2)5-11)10(7)6-12/h5-7,9-10H,2-4H2,1H3 Key: BORBLDJNKYHVJP-UHFFFAOYSA-N
- SMILES: CC1CCC(C1C=O)C(=C)C=O

Properties
Chemical formula	C_{10}H_{14}O_{2}
Molar mass	166.220 g·mol^{−1}
- Except where otherwise noted, data are given for materials in their standard state (at 25 °C [77 °F], 100 kPa). Infobox references

Dolichodial is a natural chemical compound with two aldehyde groups, which belongs to the group of iridoids.

== Chemistry ==
It has in its five-membered ring three asymmetric carbon atoms and accordingly exists in four diastereomeric pairs of enantiomers. The pairs with a different stereochemistry of dolichodial are called anisomorphal and peruphasmal.

(1R,2S,5S)-(–)-Dolichodial (A)

(1S,2R,5R)-(+)-Dolichodial (A')

(1S,2S,5S)-(+)-Anisomorphal (B)

(1R,2R,5R)-(–)-Anisomorphal (B')

(1R,2S,5R)-Peruphasmal (C)

(1S,2R,5S)-Peruphasmal (C')

(1S,2S,5R)-Stereoisomer (D)

(1R,2R,5S)-Stereoisomer (D')

== Occurrence ==
Dolichodial and its stereoisomers can be found in the essential oils of certain plants, and also in the defensive secretions of some insect species.
