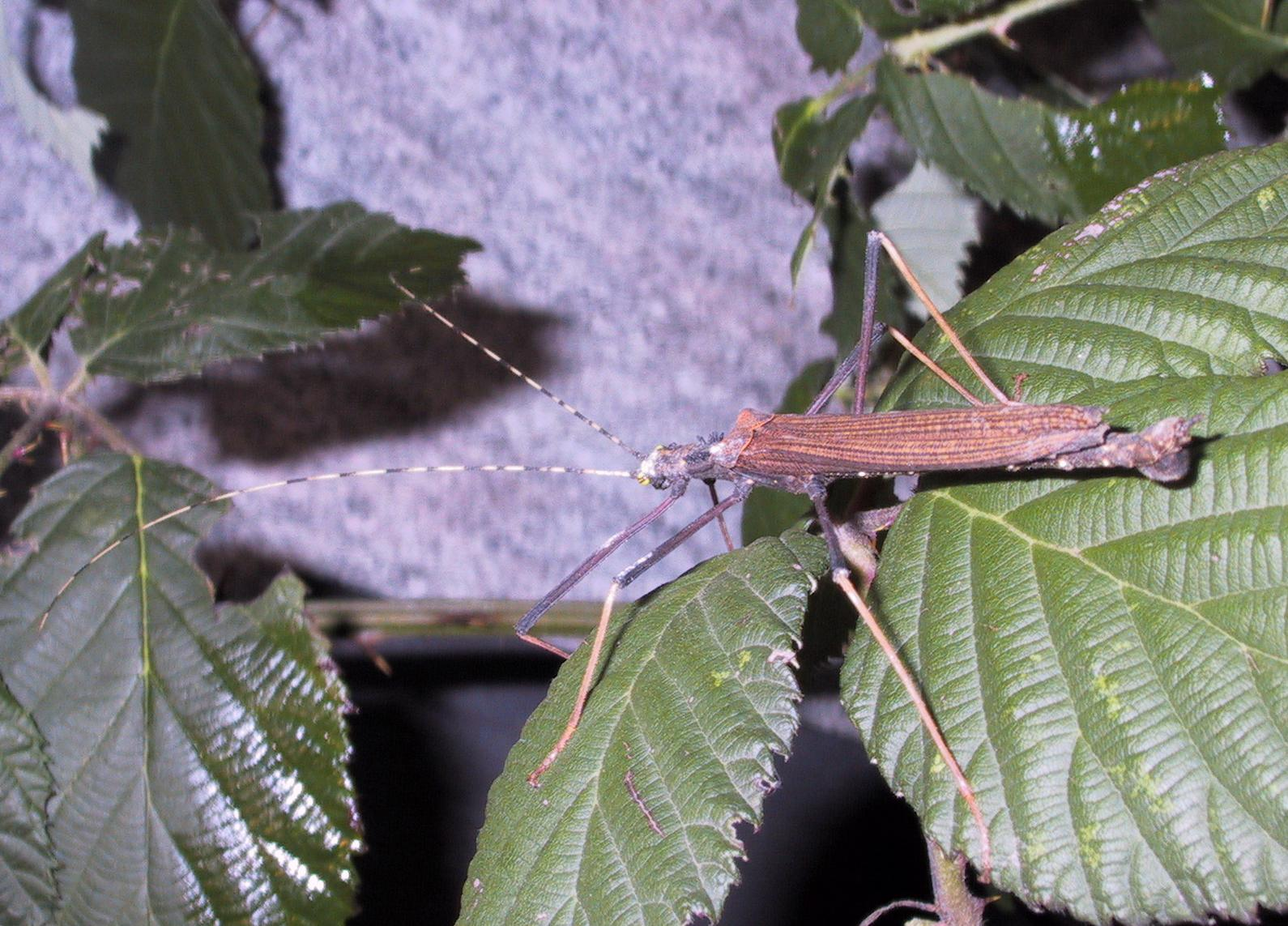
- Pseudophasma acanthonotum

Scientific classification
- Kingdom: Animalia
- Phylum: Arthropoda
- Clade: Pancrustacea
- Class: Insecta
- Order: Phasmatodea
- Superfamily: Pseudophasmatoidea
- Family: Pseudophasmatidae; Rehn, 1904

Subfamilies
- Pseudophasmatinae; Stratocleinae; Xerosomatinae

= Pseudophasmatidae =

Family of stick insects

Pseudophasmatidae is a family of stick insect, in the suborder Euphasmatodea, commonly called the "striped walkingsticks". An important identifying characteristic is its mesothorax, which is never more than three times as long as the prothorax.

== Taxonomy ==
Tribes and genera are placed in three subfamilies:

=== Pseudophasmatinae ===
Authority: Rehn, 1904

Tribe Anisomorphini Redtenbacher, 1906

1. Anisomorpha Gray, 1835
2. Atratomorpha Conle & Hennemann, 2002
3. Autolyca Stål, 1875
4. Columbiophasma Conle & Hennemann, 2002
5. Decidia Stål, 1875
6. Malacomorpha Rehn, 1906
7. Monticomorpha Conle & Hennemann, 2002
8. Ornatomorpha Conle, Hennemann & Gutiérrez, 2011
9. Peruphasma Conle & Hennemann, 2002
10. Pteranisomorpha Zompro, 2004
11. Urucumania Zompro, 2004

Tribe Paraprisopodini

1. Paraprisopus Redtenbacher, 1906 (synonym Melophasma from South America)

Tribe Pseudophasmatini Kirby, 1904

1. Ignacia Rehn, 1904
2. Paranisomorpha Redtenbacher, 1906
3. Pseudophasma Kirby, 1896
4. Tithonophasma Zompro, 2004
5. Nanhuaphasma Chen, He & Li, 2002

=== Stratocleinae ===
Authority: Günther, 1953 – single tribe Stratocleini Günther, 1953 - central & S. America, Malesia

1. Agrostia Redtenbacher, 1906
2. Anisa Redtenbacher, 1906
3. Antherice Redtenbacher, 1906
4. Anthericonia Zompro, 2004
5. Brizoides Redtenbacher, 1906
6. Cesaphasma Koçak & Kemal, 2010
7. Chlorophasma Redtenbacher, 1906
8. Eucles (insect) Redtenbacher, 1906
9. Euphasma Redtenbacher, 1906
10. Holca Redtenbacher, 1906
11. Olcyphides Griffini, 1899
12. Paraphasma Redtenbacher, 1906
13. Parastratocles Redtenbacher, 1906
14. Stratocles Stål, 1875
15. Tenerella Redtenbacher, 1906

=== Xerosomatinae ===
Authorities: Bradley & Galil, 1977

Tribe Prexaspini Zompro, 2004

1. Isagoras Stål, 1875
2. Metriophasma Uvarov, 1940
3. Oestrophora Redtenbacher, 1906
4. Olinta Redtenbacher, 1906
5. Periphloea Redtenbacher, 1906
6. Perliodes Redtenbacher, 1906
7. Planudes Stål, 1875
8. Prexaspes Stål, 1875

Tribe Setosini Zompro, 2004

1. Setosa Redtenbacher, 1906

Tribe Xerosomatini Bradley & Galil, 1977

1. Acanthoclonia Stål, 1875
2. Apteroxylus Bellanger, Jourdan & Lelong, 2012
3. Creoxylus Serville, 1838
4. Grylloclonia Zompro, 2004
5. Mirophasma Redtenbacher, 1906
6. Pachyphloea Redtenbacher, 1906
7. Parobrimus Scudder, 1896
8. Xera Redtenbacher, 1906
9. Xerosoma Serville, 1831
10. Xylospinodes Zompro, 2004
