= Entomological Society of America =

Scientific society in the United States

- Abbreviation: ESA
- Formation: 1889; 137 years ago
- Founder: Charles V. Riley
- Headquarters: Annapolis, Maryland
- Website: www.entsoc.org
- Formerly called: American Association of Economic Entomologists

The Entomological Society of America (ESA) was founded in 1889 and today has more than 7,000 members, including educators, extension personnel, consultants, students, researchers, and scientists from agricultural departments, health agencies, private industries, colleges and universities, and state and federal governments. It serves the professional and scientific needs of entomologists and people in related disciplines. To facilitate communication among members, the ESA is divided into four sections based on entomological interests, and six branches, based on geographic proximity. The national office is located in Annapolis, Maryland.

== History ==
In 1889, the American Association of Economic Entomologists was founded by Charles V. Riley, primarily focusing on economic entomology. In 1906, the Entomological Society of America was organized to address the needs of the broader dimensions of biology, taxonomy, morphology, and faunistic studies of insects.

== Governance ==
Presidents serve for one year with the assistance of the Governing Board.

Executive Secretaries/Executive Directors serve for longer and have included:

- 1953–1955 — Ashley B. Gurney
- 1955–1968 — Robert Nelson, also President for 1971
- 1968–? — Wallace P. Murdoch

== Publications ==
ESA publishes nine journals in partnership with Oxford University Press.

- Annals of the Entomological Society of America
- Environmental Entomology
- Journal of Economic Entomology
- Journal of Medical Entomology
- American Entomologist
- Arthropod Management Tests
- Journal of Insect Science
- Insect Systematics and Diversity
- Journal of Integrated Pest Management

== Branches ==
The six ESA branches include five North American branches: Eastern, North Central, Pacific, Southeastern, and Southwestern. Their members are states/provinces of the US, Canada, and Mexico, with Puerto Rico and the U.S. Virgin Islands in the Southeastern Branch and the US territories of the Pacific Ocean in the Pacific Branch. All other nations and territories comprise the sixth, International Branch.
