= List of Asilidae species: C =

This article lists described species of the family Asilidae start with letter C.

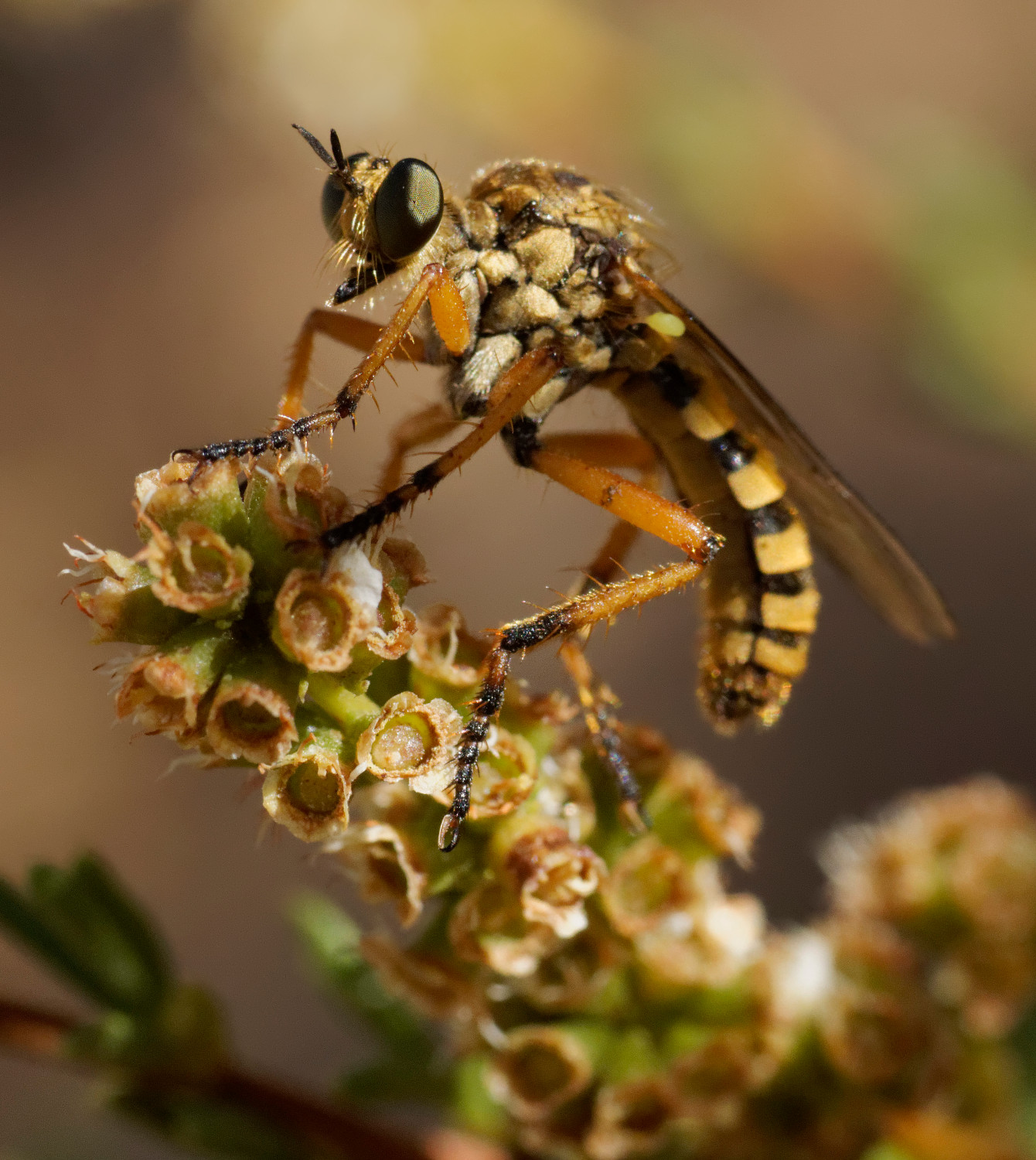
Callinicus pictitarsis

A • B • C • D • E • F • G • H • I • J • K • L • M • N • O • P • Q • R • S • T • U • V • W • Y • Z

== List of species ==
=== Cabasa ===
- Cabasa glabrata (Walker, 1861)
- Cabasa honesta (Walker, 1858)

=== Callinicus ===
- Callinicus pictitarsis (Bigot, 1878)
- Callinicus pollenius (Cole, 1919)
- Callinicus vittatus (Wilcox, 1936)

=== Carebaricus ===
- Carebaricus rionegrensis (Lamas, 1971)

=== Carinefferia ===
- Carinefferia caliente (Wilcox, 1966)
- Carinefferia carinata (Bellardi, 1861)
- Carinefferia concinnata (Williston, 1901)
- Carinefferia cressoni (Hine, 1919)
- Carinefferia jubata (Williston, 1885)
- Carinefferia latruncula (Williston, 1885)
- Carinefferia ordwayae (Wilcox, 1966)
- Carinefferia parvula (Bellardi, 1861)
- Carinefferia prolificus (Osten-Sacken, 1887)
- Carinefferia subcuprea (Schaeffer, 1916)
- Carinefferia willistoni (Hine, 1919)

=== Carreraomyia ===
- Carreraomyia acapulquensis (Cole & Pritchard, 1964)
- Carreraomyia alpuyeca (Cole & Pritchard, 1964)

=== Cenochromyia ===
- Cenochromyia guttata (Hermann, 1912)
- Cenochromyia puer (Doleschall, 1858)
- Cenochromyia tripars (Walker, 1861)
- Cenochromyia xanthogaster (Hermann, 1912)

=== Ceraturgus ===
- Ceraturgus aurulentus (Fabricius, 1805)
- Ceraturgus cruciatus (Say, 1823)
- Ceraturgus elizabethae (Brimley, 1924)
- Ceraturgus fasciatus (Walker, 1849)
- Ceraturgus hedini (Engel, 1934)
- Ceraturgus kawamurae (Matsumura, 1916)
- Ceraturgus mitchelli (Brimley, 1924)
- Ceraturgus niger (Macquart, 1838)
- Ceraturgus similis (Johnson, 1912)

=== Cerdistus ===
- Cerdistus acuminatus (Theodor, 1980)
- Cerdistus antilco (Walker, 1849)
- Cerdistus australasiae (Schiner, 1868)
- Cerdistus australis (Macquart, 1847)
- Cerdistus australis (Lehr, 1967)
- Cerdistus begauxi (Tomasovic, 2005)
- Cerdistus blascozumetai (Weinberg & Bächli, 1975)
- Cerdistus claripes (White, 1918)
- Cerdistus coedicus (Walker, 1849)
- Cerdistus creticus (Hüttinger & Hradský, 1983)
- Cerdistus cygnis (Dakin & Fordham, 1922)
- Cerdistus dactylopygus (Janssens, 1968)
- Cerdistus debilis (Becker, 1923)
- Cerdistus desertorum (Efflatoun, 1934)
- Cerdistus elegans (Bigot, 1888)
- Cerdistus elicitus (Walker, 1851)
- Cerdistus erythruroides (Theodor, 1980)
- Cerdistus exilis (Macquart, 1838)
- Cerdistus flavicinctus (White, 1914)
- Cerdistus graminis (White, 1914)
- Cerdistus hermonensis (Theodor, 1980)
- Cerdistus indifferens (Becker, 1923)
- Cerdistus jubatus (Becker, 1923)
- Cerdistus laetus (Becker, 1925)
- Cerdistus lativentris (Pandellé, 1905)
- Cerdistus lautus (White, 1918)
- Cerdistus lekesi (Moucha & Hradský, 1963)
- Cerdistus lividus (White, 1918)
- Cerdistus manii (Schiner, 1867)
- Cerdistus maricus (Walker, 1851)
- Cerdistus melanomerus (Tsacas, 1964)
- Cerdistus mellis (Macquart, 1838)
- Cerdistus novus (Lehr, 1995)
- Cerdistus olympianus (Janssens, 1959)
- Cerdistus pallidus (Efflatoun, 1927)
- Cerdistus prostratus (Hardy, 1935)
- Cerdistus rectangularis (Theodor, 1980)
- Cerdistus rufometatarsus (Macquart, 1855)
- Cerdistus rusticanoides (Hardy, 1926)
- Cerdistus rusticanus (White, 1918)
- Cerdistus santoriensis (Hüttinger & Hradský, 1983)
- Cerdistus separatus (Hardy, 1935)
- Cerdistus setifemoratus (Macquart, 1855)
- Cerdistus setosus (Hardy, 1920)
- Cerdistus sugonjaevi (Lehr, 1967)
- Cerdistus villicatus (Walker, 1851)

=== Cerotainia ===
- Cerotainia albibarbis (Curran, 1930)
- Cerotainia albipilosa (Curran, 1930)
- Cerotainia argyropasta (Hermann, 1921)
- Cerotainia argyropus (Schiner, 1868)
- Cerotainia argyropyga (Hermann, 1912)
- Cerotainia atrata (Jones, 1907)
- Cerotainia aurata (Schiner, 1868)
- Cerotainia bella (Schiner, 1867)
- Cerotainia bolivarii (Kaletta, 1986)
- Cerotainia brasiliensis (Schiner, 1867)
- Cerotainia camposi (Curran, 1934)
- Cerotainia clavijoi (Kaletta, 1986)
- Cerotainia dasythrix (Hermann, 1912)
- Cerotainia debilis (Hermann, 1912)
- Cerotainia dubia (Bigot, 1878)
- Cerotainia feminea (Curran, 1930)
- Cerotainia flavipes (Hermann, 1912)
- Cerotainia gerulewiczii (Kaletta, 1986)
- Cerotainia jolyi (Kaletta, 1986)
- Cerotainia leonina (Hermann, 1912)
- Cerotainia longimana (Hermann, 1912)
- Cerotainia lynchii (Williston, 1889)
- Cerotainia macrocera (Say, 1823)
- Cerotainia marginata (Hermann, 1912)
- Cerotainia melanosoma (Scarbrough & Knutson, 1989)
- Cerotainia minima (Curran, 1930)
- Cerotainia nigripennis (Bellardi, 1861)
- Cerotainia ornatipes (James, 1953)
- Cerotainia propinqua (Schiner, 1868)
- Cerotainia rhopalocera (Lynch & Arribálzaga, 1882)
- Cerotainia sarae (Rueda, 1998)
- Cerotainia sola (Scarbrough & Perez-Gelabert, 2006)
- Cerotainia unicolor (Hermann, 1912)
- Cerotainia violaceithorax (Lynch & Arribálzaga, 1880)
- Cerotainia willistoni (Curran, 1930)
- Cerotainia xanthoptera (Wiedemann, 1828)

=== Cerotainiops ===
- Cerotainiops kernae (Martin, 1959)
- Cerotainiops mcclayi (Martin, 1959)
- Cerotainiops omus (Pritchard, 1942)

=== Cerozodus ===
- Cerozodus nodicornis (Wiedemann, 1828)

=== Chilesus ===
- Chilesus geminatus (Bromley, 1932)

=== Choerades ===
Choerades femorata eats Lagria hirta

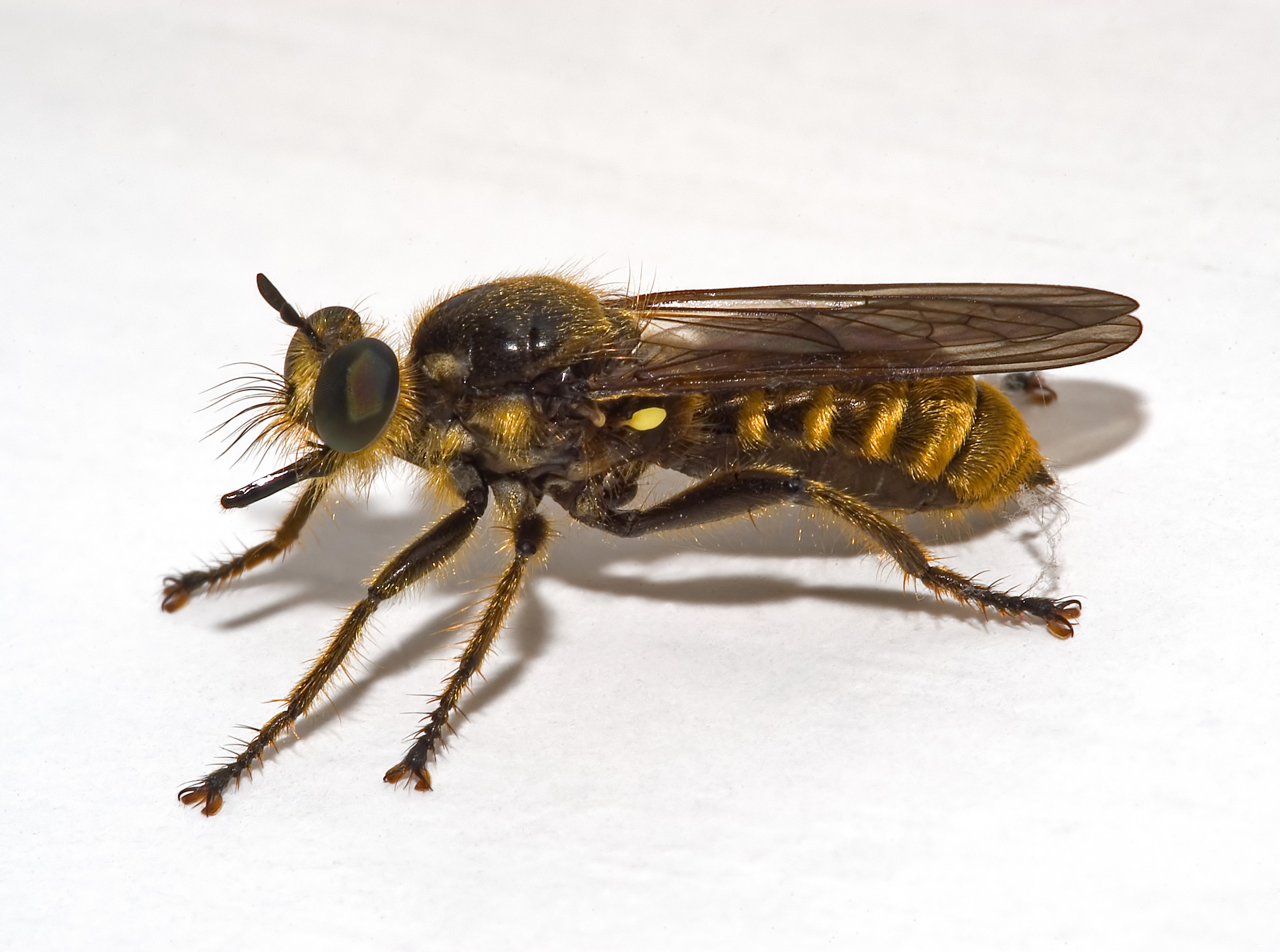
Choerades fimbriata

- Choerades amurensis (Hermann, 1914)
- Choerades antipai (Weinberg & Pârvu, 1999)
- Choerades asprospilos (Young & Hradský, 2007)
- Choerades bella (Loew, 1858)
- Choerades castellanii (Hradský, 1962)
- Choerades caucasica (Richter & Mamaev, 1971)
- Choerades comptissima (Walker, 1857)
- Choerades conopoides (Oldroyd, 1972)
- Choerades dioctriaeformis (Meigen, 1820)
- Choerades fimbriata (Meigen, 1820)
- Choerades fortunata (Baez & Weinberg, 1981)
- Choerades hamardabanica (Lehr, 1991)
- Choerades ignea (Meigen, 1820)
- Choerades isshikii (Matsumura, 1916)
- Choerades kwadjoi (Tomasovic, 2007)
- Choerades lapponica (Zetterstedt, [183)
- Choerades montana (Lehr, 1977)
- Choerades mouchai (Hradský, 1985)
- Choerades multipunctata (Oldroyd, 1974)
- Choerades nigrescens (Ricardo, 1925)
- Choerades nigrovittata (Matsumura, 1916)
- Choerades nikolaevi (Lehr, 1977)
- Choerades perrara (Lehr, 1991)
- Choerades potanini (Lehr, 1991)
- Choerades rufipes (Fallén, 1814)
- Choerades scelesta (Richter, 1974)
- Choerades steinbergi (Richter, 1964)
- Choerades taiga (Lehr, 1991)
- Choerades unifascia (Walker, 1857)
- Choerades ursula (Loew, 1851)
- Choerades venatrix (Loew, 1847)
- Choerades xanthothrix (Hermann, 1914)
- Choerades yaeyamana (Haupt & Azuma, 1998)

=== Chryseutria ===
- Chryseutria amphibola (Clements, 1985)
- Chryseutria nigrina (Hardy, 1928)

=== Chrysopogon ===
- Chrysopogon agilis (Clements, 1985)
- Chrysopogon albosetosus (Clements, 1985)
- Chrysopogon aureus (Clements, 1985)
- Chrysopogon bellus (Clements, 1985)
- Chrysopogon bicolor (Clements, 1985)
- Chrysopogon brunnipes (Clements, 1985)
- Chrysopogon castaneus (Clements, 1985)
- Chrysopogon catachrysus (Clements, 1985)
- Chrysopogon conopsoides (Fabricius, 1775)
- Chrysopogon crabroniformis (von Roeder, 1881)
- Chrysopogon daptes (Clements, 1985)
- Chrysopogon dialeucus (Clements, 1985)
- Chrysopogon diaphanes (Clements, 1985)
- Chrysopogon fasciatus (Ricardo, 1912)
- Chrysopogon fuscus (Clements, 1985)
- Chrysopogon gammonensis (Lavigne, 2006)
- Chrysopogon harpaleus (Clements, 1985)
- Chrysopogon horni (Hardy, 1934)
- Chrysopogon leucodema (Clements, 1985)
- Chrysopogon melanorrhinus (Clements, 1985)
- Chrysopogon melas (Clements, 1985)
- Chrysopogon micrus (Clements, 1985)
- Chrysopogon muelleri (von Roeder, 1892)
- Chrysopogon pallidipennis (White, 1918)
- Chrysopogon papuensis (Clements, 1985)
- Chrysopogon paramonovi (Clements, 1985)
- Chrysopogon parvus (Clements, 1985)
- Chrysopogon pellos (Clements, 1985)
- Chrysopogon pilosifacies (Clements, 1985)
- Chrysopogon proximus (Clements, 1985)
- Chrysopogon rutilus (Clements, 1985)
- Chrysopogon sphecodes (Clements, 1985)
- Chrysopogon trianguliferus (Clements, 1985)
- Chrysopogon whitei (Hull, 1958)
- Chrysopogon xanthus (Clements, 1985)

=== Chrysotriclis ===
- Chrysotriclis willinkorum (Artigas & Papavero, 1997)

=== Chylophaga ===
- Chylophaga australis (Ricardo, 1912)

=== Chymedax ===
- Chymedax delicatulus (Hull, 1958)

=== Clariola ===
- Clariola cyaneithorax (Meijere, 1913)
- Clariola luteiventris (Meijere, 1913)
- Clariola pipunculoides (Walker, 1865)
- Clariola pulchra (Kertész, 1901)
- Clariola unicolor (Meijere, 1913)

=== Clephydroneura ===
- Clephydroneura alveolusa (Shi, 1995)
- Clephydroneura anamalaiensis (Joseph & Parui, 1997)
- Clephydroneura apicalis (Oldroyd, 1938)
- Clephydroneura apicihirta (Shi, 1995)
- Clephydroneura bangalorensis (Joseph & Parui, 1997)
- Clephydroneura bannerghattaensis (Joseph & Parui, 1997)
- Clephydroneura bengalensis (Macquart, 1838)
- Clephydroneura bidensa (Shi, 1995)
- Clephydroneura brevipennis (Oldroyd, 1938)
- Clephydroneura cilia (Shi, 1995)
- Clephydroneura cochinensis (Oldroyd, 1938)
- Clephydroneura cristata (Oldroyd, 1938)
- Clephydroneura cylindra (Shi, 1995)
- Clephydroneura dasi (Parui & Das, 1994)
- Clephydroneura distincta (Oldroyd, 1938)
- Clephydroneura duvaucelii (Macquart, 1838)
- Clephydroneura exilis (Oldroyd, 1938)
- Clephydroneura fulvihirta (Shi, 1995)
- Clephydroneura ghorpadei (Joseph & Parui, 1997)
- Clephydroneura ghoshi (Parui & Das, 1994)
- Clephydroneura gravelyi (Joseph & Parui, 1997)
- Clephydroneura gymnura (Oldroyd, 1938)
- Clephydroneura hainanensis (Jiang, 1988)
- Clephydroneura hamiforceps (Shi, 1995)
- Clephydroneura indiana (Joseph & Parui, 1997)
- Clephydroneura karikalensis (Parui & Das, 1994)
- Clephydroneura karnatakaensis (Joseph & Parui, 1997)
- Clephydroneura lali (Joseph & Parui, 1997)
- Clephydroneura martini (Joseph & Parui, 1997)
- Clephydroneura minor (Oldroyd, 1938)
- Clephydroneura mudigorensis (Joseph & Parui, 1997)
- Clephydroneura mysorensis (Joseph & Parui, 1997)
- Clephydroneura nelsoni (Joseph & Parui, 1997)
- Clephydroneura nigrata (Shi, 1995)
- Clephydroneura nilaparvata (Joseph & Parui, 1997)
- Clephydroneura oldroydi (Joseph & Parui, 1997)
- Clephydroneura promboonae (Tomosovic & Grootaert, 2003)
- Clephydroneura pulla (Oldroyd, 1938)
- Clephydroneura robusta (Joseph & Parui, 1997)
- Clephydroneura rossi (Joseph & Parui, 1995)
- Clephydroneura semirufa (Oldroyd, 1938)
- Clephydroneura singhi (Joseph & Parui, 1997)
- Clephydroneura sundaica (Jaennicke, 1867)
- Clephydroneura trifissura (Shi, 1995)
- Clephydroneura wilcoxi (Joseph & Parui, 1997)

=== Clinopogon ===
- Clinopogon barrus (Walker, 1849)
- Clinopogon cinctellus (Bigot, 1879)
- Clinopogon odontoferus (Joseph & Parui, 1984)
- Clinopogon plumbeus (Fabricius, 1775)
- Clinopogon reginaldi (Séguy, 1955)
- Clinopogon scalaris (Bigot, 1879)

=== Cnodalomyia ===
- Cnodalomyia catarinensis (Lamas & Mellinger, 2008)
- Cnodalomyia obtusa (Hull, 1962)

=== Cochleariocera ===
- Cochleariocera neusae (Artigas & Papavero, 1997)

=== Codula ===
- Codula conspecta (Clements, 1985)
- Codula limbipennis (Macquart, 1850)
- Codula occidentalis (Clements, 1985)
- Codula vespiformis (Thomson, 1869)

=== Coleomyia ===
- Coleomyia alticola (James, 1941)
- Coleomyia crumborum (Martin, 1953)
- Coleomyia hinei (Wilcox & Martin, 1935)
- Coleomyia rainieri (Wilcox & Martin, 1935)
- Coleomyia rubida (Martin, 1953)
- Coleomyia sculleni (Wilcox & Martin, 1935)
- Coleomyia setigera (Cole, 1919)

=== Colepia ===
- Colepia abludo (Daniels, 1983)
- Colepia chrysochaites (Daniels, 1987)
- Colepia comatacauda (Daniels, 1987)
- Colepia compernis (Daniels, 1987)
- Colepia cultripes (Daniels, 1987)
- Colepia flavifacies (Daniels, 1987)
- Colepia horrida (Daniels, 1987)
- Colepia ignicolor (Daniels, 1987)
- Colepia lanata (Daniels, 1987)
- Colepia naevia (Daniels, 1987)
- Colepia novaeguineae (Daniels, 1987)

=== Comantella ===
- Comantella cristata (Coquillett, 1893)
- Comantella fallei (Back, 1909)
- Comantella pacifica (Curran, 1926)
- Comantella rotgeri (James, 1937)

=== Congomochtherus ===
- Congomochtherus acuminatus (Oldroyd, 1974)
- Congomochtherus elferinki (Londt & Tsacas, 1987)
- Congomochtherus inachus (Londt & Tsacas, 1987)
- Congomochtherus lobatus (Oldroyd, 1970)
- Congomochtherus oldoydi (Londt & Tsacas, 1987)
- Congomochtherus penicillatus (Speiser, 1910)
- Congomochtherus potamius (Londt & Tsacas, 1987)

=== Connomyia ===
- Connomyia annae (Londt, 1993)
- Connomyia argyropodos (Londt, 1993)
- Connomyia argyropus (Engel, 1932)
- Connomyia barkeri (Bromley, 1947)
- Connomyia briani (Londt, 1993)
- Connomyia callima (Londt, 1993)
- Connomyia compressa (Karsch, 1886)
- Connomyia dravidica (Joseph & Parui, 1990)
- Connomyia ellioti (Londt, 1993)
- Connomyia indica (Joseph & Parui, 1990)
- Connomyia leonina (Engel, 1932)
- Connomyia mali (Londt, 1993)
- Connomyia midas (Londt, 1993)
- Connomyia oropegia (Londt, 1993)
- Connomyia pallida (Ricardo, 1925)
- Connomyia perata (Londt, 1993)
- Connomyia punctata (Engel, 1932)
- Connomyia tellinii (Bezzi, 1906)
- Connomyia tsacasi (Londt, 1993)
- Connomyia varipennis (Ricardo, 1925)
- Connomyia zeus (Londt, 1993)

=== Conosiphon ===
- Conosiphon alter (Becker, 1923)
- Conosiphon pauper (Becker, 1907)
- Conosiphon similis (Becker, 1923)

=== Cophinopoda ===
- Cophinopoda aldabraensis (Tsacas & Artigas, 1994)
- Cophinopoda andrewsi (Oldroyd, 1964)
- Cophinopoda barbonica (Tsacas & Artigas, 1994)
- Cophinopoda chinensis (Fabricius, 1794)
- Cophinopoda disputata (Tsacas & Artigas, 1994)
- Cophinopoda matilei (Tsacas & Artigas, 1994)
- Cophinopoda oldroydi (Tsacas & Artigas, 1994)
- Cophinopoda schumanni (Hradský & Hüttinger, 1982)

=== Cophura ===
- Cophura acapulcae (Pritchard, 1943)
- Cophura albosetosa (Hine, 1908)
- Cophura ameles (Pritchard, 1943)
- Cophura apotma (Pritchard, 1943)
- Cophura atypha (Pritchard, 1943)
- Cophura bella (Loew, 1872)
- Cophura brevicornis (Williston, 1883)
- Cophura caca (Pritchard, 1943)
- Cophura calla (Pritchard, 1943)
- Cophura clausa (Coquillett, 1893)
- Cophura cora (Pritchard, 1943)
- Cophura dammersi (Wilcox, 1965)
- Cophura daphne (Pritchard, 1943)
- Cophura dora (Pritchard, 1943)
- Cophura feigei (Kaletta, 1983)
- Cophura ferugsoni (Wilcox, 1965)
- Cophura fisheri (Wilcox, 1965)
- Cophura fur (Williston, 1885)
- Cophura getzendaneri (Wilcox, 1959)
- Cophura hennei (Wilcox & Martin, 1945)
- Cophura hesperia (Pritchard, 1935)
- Cophura hurdi (Hull, 1960)
- Cophura igualae (Pritchard, 1943)
- Cophura nephressa (Pritchard, 1943)
- Cophura painteri (Pritchard, 1943)
- Cophura picta (Carrera, 1955)
- Cophura pollinosa (Curran, 1930)
- Cophura powersi (Wilcox, 1965)
- Cophura pulchella (Williston, 1901)
- Cophura rozeni (Wilcox, 1965)
- Cophura sculleni (Wilcox, 1937)
- Cophura sodalis (Osten-Sacken, 1887)
- Cophura stylosa (Curran, 1931)
- Cophura tanbarki (Wilcox, 1965)
- Cophura texana (Bromley, 1934)
- Cophura timberlakei (Wilcox, 1965)
- Cophura tolandi (Wilcox, 1959)
- Cophura vanduzeei (Wilcox, 1965)
- Cophura vandykei (Wilcox, 1965)
- Cophura vera (Pritchard, 1935)
- Cophura vitripennis (Curran, 1927)
- Cophura wilcoxi (Kaletta, 1983)
- Cophura zandra (Pritchard, 1943)

=== Cormansis ===
- Cormansis halictides (Walker, 1851)

=== Corymyia ===
- Corymyia antimelas (Londt, 1994)
- Corymyia euryops (Londt, 1994)
- Corymyia melas (Londt, 1994)
- Corymyia xantha (Londt, 1994)

=== Cratolestes ===
- Cratolestes wirthi (Artigas, 1970)

=== Cratopoda ===
- Cratopoda emarginata (Artigas, 1970)
- Cratopoda helix (Bromley, 1935)

=== Creolestes ===
- Creolestes cinereum (Bigot, 1878)

=== Crobilocerus ===
- Crobilocerus auriger (Musso, 1973)
- Crobilocerus engeli (Geller-Grimm & Hradský, 1999)
- Crobilocerus megilliformis (Loew, 1847)
- Crobilocerus spinosus (Theodor, 1980)

=== Cryptomerinx ===
- Cryptomerinx laphriicornis (Enderlein, 1914)
- Cryptomerinx mirandai (Carrera, 1951)

=== Ctenodontina ===
- Ctenodontina carrerai (Hull, 1958)
- Ctenodontina maya (Carrera & Andretta, 1953)
- Ctenodontina mochica (Lamas, 1973)
- Ctenodontina pectinatipes (Enderlein, 1914)

=== Ctenota ===
- Ctenota armeniaca (Paramonov, 1930)
- Ctenota asiatica (Lehr, 1964)
- Ctenota brunnea (Theodor, 1980)
- Ctenota coerulea (Becker, 1913)
- Ctenota efflatouni (Engel, 1925)
- Ctenota halophila (Lehr, 1964)
- Ctenota molitrix (Loew, 1873)

=== Cylicomera ===
- Cylicomera dissona (Lamas, 1973)

=== Cymbipyga ===
- Cymbipyga cymbafera (Artigas, 1983)

=== Cyphomyiactia ===
- Cyphomyiactia costai (Artigas & Papavero, 1991)

=== Cyrtophrys ===
- Cyrtophrys albimanus (Carrera, 1949)

=== Cyrtopogon ===
Cyrtopogon lateralis female

- Cyrtopogon ablautoides (Melander, 1923)
- Cyrtopogon albibarbatus (Lehr, 1998)
- Cyrtopogon albifacies (Johnson, 1942)
- Cyrtopogon albifrons (Wilcox & Martin, 1936)
- Cyrtopogon albovarians (Curran, 1924)
- Cyrtopogon aldrichi (Wilcox & Martin, 1936)
- Cyrtopogon alleni (Back, 1909)
- Cyrtopogon annulatus (Hermann, 1906)
- Cyrtopogon anomalus (Cole, 1919)
- Cyrtopogon aurifex (Osten-Sacken, 1877)
- Cyrtopogon auripilosus (Wilcox & Martin, 1936)
- Cyrtopogon banksi (Wilcox & Martin, 1936)
- Cyrtopogon basingeri (Wilcox & Martin, 1936)
- Cyrtopogon beameri (Wilcox & Martin, 1936)
- Cyrtopogon bigelowi (Curran, 1924)
- Cyrtopogon caesius (Melander, 1923)
- Cyrtopogon callipedilus (Loew, 1874)
- Cyrtopogon centralis (Loew, 1871)
- Cyrtopogon chagnoni (Curran, 1939)
- Cyrtopogon curtipennis (Wilcox & Martin, 1936)
- Cyrtopogon curtistylus (Curran, 1923)
- Cyrtopogon cymbalista (Osten-Sacken, 1877)
- Cyrtopogon dasyllis (Williston, 1893)
- Cyrtopogon dasylloides (Williston, 1883)
- Cyrtopogon distinctitarsus (Adisoemarto, 1967)
- Cyrtopogon evidens (Osten-Sacken, 1877)
- Cyrtopogon fumipennis (Wilcox & Martin, 1936)
- Cyrtopogon glarealis (Melander, 1923)
- Cyrtopogon gobiensis (Lehr, 1998)
- Cyrtopogon gorodkovi (Lehr, 1966)
- Cyrtopogon grunini (Lehr, 1998)
- Cyrtopogon idahoensis (Wilcox & Martin, 1936)
- Cyrtopogon infuscatus (Cole, 1919)
- Cyrtopogon inversus (Curran, 1923)
- Cyrtopogon jakutensis (Lehr, 1998)
- Cyrtopogon khasiensis (Bromley, 1935)
- Cyrtopogon kirilli (Lehr, 1977)
- Cyrtopogon kovalevi (Lehr, 1998)
- Cyrtopogon kozlovi (Lehr, 1998)
- Cyrtopogon kushka (Lehr, 1998)
- Cyrtopogon laphrides (Walker, 1851)
- Cyrtopogon laphriformis (Curran, 1923)
- Cyrtopogon laxenecera (Bromley, 1935)
- Cyrtopogon leleji (Lehr, 1998)
- Cyrtopogon leptotarsus (Curran, 1923)
- Cyrtopogon leucozona (Loew, 1874)
- Cyrtopogon longimanus (Loew, 1874)
- Cyrtopogon lutatius (Walker, 1849)
- Cyrtopogon lyratus (Osten-Sacken, 1878)
- Cyrtopogon jemezi (Wilcox & Martin, 1936)
- Cyrtopogon malistus (Richter, 1974)
- Cyrtopogon marginalis (Loew, 1866)
- Cyrtopogon michnoi (Lehr, 1998)
- Cyrtopogon nitidus (Cole, 1924)
- Cyrtopogon nugator (Osten-Sacken, 1877)
- Cyrtopogon oasis (Lehr, 1998)
- Cyrtopogon ornatus (Oldroyd, 1964)
- Cyrtopogon pamirensis (Lehr, 1998)
- Cyrtopogon pedemontanus (Bezzi, 1927)
- Cyrtopogon perrisi (Séguy, 1927)
- Cyrtopogon perspicax (Cole, 1919)
- Cyrtopogon pictipennis (Coquillett, 1899)
- Cyrtopogon planitarsus (Wilcox & Martin, 1936)
- Cyrtopogon platycaudus (Curran, 1924)
- Cyrtopogon plausor (Osten-Sacken, 1877)
- Cyrtopogon popovi (Lehr, 1966)
- Cyrtopogon praepes (Williston, 1883)
- Cyrtopogon profusus (Osten-Sacken, 1877)
- Cyrtopogon pulcher (Back, 1909)
- Cyrtopogon pulchripes (Loew, 1871)
- Cyrtopogon rainieri (Wilcox & Martin, 1936)
- Cyrtopogon rattus (Osten-Sacken, 1877)
- Cyrtopogon robustisetus (Lehr, 1998)
- Cyrtopogon ruficornis (Fabricius, 1794)
- Cyrtopogon rufitibialis (Bigot, 1878)
- Cyrtopogon rufotarsus (Back, 1909)
- Cyrtopogon sabroskyi (Lavigne, 1981)
- Cyrtopogon sansoni (Curran, 1923)
- Cyrtopogon saxicola (Lehr, 1998)
- Cyrtopogon semitarius (Melander, 1923)
- Cyrtopogon skopini (Lehr, 1998)
- Cyrtopogon stenofrons (Wilcox & Martin, 1936)
- Cyrtopogon sudator (Osten-Sacken, 1877)
- Cyrtopogon svaneticus (Lehr, 1998)
- Cyrtopogon swezeyi (Wilcox & Martin, 1936)
- Cyrtopogon tarbagataicus (Lehr, 1998)
- Cyrtopogon tenuibarbus (Loew, 1856)
- Cyrtopogon tenuis (Bromley, 1924)
- Cyrtopogon thompsoni (Cole, 1919)
- Cyrtopogon tibialis (Coquillett, 1904)
- Cyrtopogon transiliensis (Lehr, 1998)
- Cyrtopogon turgenicus (Lehr, 1998)
- Cyrtopogon vanduzeei (Wilcox & Martin, 1936)
- Cyrtopogon vandykei (Wilcox & Martin, 1936)
- Cyrtopogon varans (Curran, 1923)
- Cyrtopogon villosus (Lehr, 1998)
- Cyrtopogon vulneratus (Melander, 1923)
- Cyrtopogon willistoni (Curran, 1923)

=== Cystoprosopa ===
- Cystoprosopa semirufa (Wiedemann, 1828)
