= List of Cyrtopogon species =

This is a list of 125 species in Cyrtopogon, a genus of robber flies in the family Asilidae.

== Cyrtopogon species ==
- Cyrtopogon ablautoides Melander, 1923^{i c g}
- Cyrtopogon africanus Ricardo, 1925^{c g}
- Cyrtopogon albibarbatus Lehr, 1998^{c g}
- Cyrtopogon albifacies Johnson, 1942^{i c g}
- Cyrtopogon albifrons Wilcox and Martin, 1936^{i c g}
- Cyrtopogon albovarians Curran, 1924^{i c g}
- Cyrtopogon aldrichi Wilcox and Martin, 1936^{i c g}
- Cyrtopogon alleni Back, 1909^{i c g}
- Cyrtopogon annulatus Hermann, 1906^{c g}
- Cyrtopogon anomalus Cole, 1919^{i c g}
- Cyrtopogon auratus Cole, 1919^{i c g b}
- Cyrtopogon aurifex Osten Sacken, 1877^{i c g}
- Cyrtopogon auripilosus Wilcox & Martin, 1936^{i c g b}
- Cyrtopogon banksi Wilcox & Martin, 1936^{i c g b}
- Cyrtopogon basingeri Wilcox and Martin, 1936^{i c g}
- Cyrtopogon beameri Wilcox and Martin, 1936^{i c g}
- Cyrtopogon bigelowi Curran, 1924^{i c g}
- Cyrtopogon bimacula (Walker, 1851)^{i b}
- Cyrtopogon bimaculus (Walker, 1851)^{c g}
- Cyrtopogon caesius Melander, 1923^{i c g}
- Cyrtopogon californicus Wilcox & Martin, 1936^{c g}
- Cyrtopogon callipedilus Loew, 1874^{c g b}
- Cyrtopogon carpathicus (Bezzi, 1927)^{c g}
- Cyrtopogon centralis Loew, 1871^{c g}
- Cyrtopogon chagnoni Curran, 1939^{i c g}
- Cyrtopogon culminus Bigot, 1885^{c g}
- Cyrtopogon curistylus Curran, 1923^{g}
- Cyrtopogon curtipennis Wilcox and Martin, 1936^{i c g}
- Cyrtopogon curtistylus Curran, 1923^{i c g}
- Cyrtopogon cymbalista Osten Sacken, 1877^{i c g}
- Cyrtopogon dasyllis Williston, 1893^{i c g b}
- Cyrtopogon dasylloides Williston, 1883^{i c g}
- Cyrtopogon distinctitarsus Adisoemarto, 1967^{i c g}
- Cyrtopogon dubius Williston, 1883^{i c g}
- Cyrtopogon evidens Osten Sacken, 1877^{i c g b}
- Cyrtopogon falto (Walker, 1849)^{i c g b}
- Cyrtopogon fulvicornis (Macquart, 1834)^{c g}
- Cyrtopogon fumipennis Wilcox and Martin, 1936^{i c g}
- Cyrtopogon glarealis Melander, 1923^{i c g}
- Cyrtopogon gobiensis Lehr, 1998^{c g}
- Cyrtopogon gorodkovi Lehr, 1966^{c g}
- Cyrtopogon grisescens Lehr, 1966^{c g}
- Cyrtopogon grunini Lehr, 1998^{c g}
- Cyrtopogon idahoensis Wilcox and Martin, 1936^{i c g}
- Cyrtopogon infuscatus Cole, 1919^{i c g}
- Cyrtopogon inversus Curran, 1923^{i c g b}
- Cyrtopogon jakutensis Lehr, 1998^{c g}
- Cyrtopogon jemezi Wilcox & Martin, 1936^{i c g b}
- Cyrtopogon khasiensis Bromley, 1935^{c g}
- Cyrtopogon kirilli Lehr, 1977^{c g}
- Cyrtopogon kovalevi Lehr, 1998^{c g}
- Cyrtopogon kozlovi Lehr, 1998^{c g}
- Cyrtopogon kushka Lehr, 1998^{c g}
- Cyrtopogon laphrides Walker, 1851^{c g}
- Cyrtopogon laphriformis Curran, 1923^{i c g b}
- Cyrtopogon lapponius (Zetterstedt, 1838)^{c g}
- Cyrtopogon lateralis (Fallen, 1814)^{c g}
- Cyrtopogon laxenecera Bromley, 1935^{c g}
- Cyrtopogon leleji Lehr, 1998^{c g}
- Cyrtopogon leptotarsus Curran, 1923^{i c g}
- Cyrtopogon lineotarsus Curran, 1923^{i c g}
- Cyrtopogon longibarbus Loew, 1857^{c g}
- Cyrtopogon longimanus Loew, 1874^{i c g}
- Cyrtopogon lutatius (Walker, 1849)^{i c g b}
- Cyrtopogon luteicornis (Zetterstedt, 1842)^{c g}
- Cyrtopogon lyratus Osten Sacken, 1878^{i c g b}
- Cyrtopogon maculipennis (Macquart, 1834)^{i c g}
- Cyrtopogon malistus Richter, 1974^{c g}
- Cyrtopogon marginalis Loew, 1866^{i c g b}
- Cyrtopogon melanopleurus Loew, 1866^{i g}
- Cyrtopogon meyerduerii Mik, 1864^{c g}
- Cyrtopogon michnoi Lehr, 1998^{c g}
- Cyrtopogon montanus Loew, 1874^{i c g b}
- Cyrtopogon nigritarsus Wilcox & Martin, 1936^{c g}
- Cyrtopogon nitidus Cole, 1924^{i c g}
- Cyrtopogon nugator Osten Sacken, 1877^{i c g}
- Cyrtopogon oasis Lehr, 1998^{c g}
- Cyrtopogon ornatus Oldroyd, 1964^{c g}
- Cyrtopogon pamirensis Lehr, 1998^{c g}
- Cyrtopogon pedemontanus (Bezzi, 1927)^{c g}
- Cyrtopogon perrisi Seguy, 1927^{c g}
- Cyrtopogon perspicax Cole, 1919^{i c g}
- Cyrtopogon pictipennis Coquillett, 1898^{c g}
- Cyrtopogon planitarsus Wilcox and Martin, 1936^{i c g}
- Cyrtopogon platycaudus Curran, 1924^{i c g}
- Cyrtopogon plausor Osten Sacken, 1877^{i c g b}
- Cyrtopogon popovi Lehr, 1966^{c g}
- Cyrtopogon praepes Williston, 1883^{i c g}
- Cyrtopogon princeps Osten Sacken, 1877^{i c g}
- Cyrtopogon profusus Osten Sacken, 1877^{i c g}
- Cyrtopogon pulcher Back, 1909^{i c g}
- Cyrtopogon pulchripes Loew, 1871^{c g}
- Cyrtopogon pyrenaeus Villeneuve, 1913^{c g}
- Cyrtopogon quadripunctatus Hermann, 1906^{c g}
- Cyrtopogon rainieri Wilcox and Martin, 1936^{i c g}
- Cyrtopogon rattus Osten Sacken, 1877^{i c g}
- Cyrtopogon rejectus Osten Sacken, 1877^{i c g}
- Cyrtopogon robustisetus Lehr, 1998^{c g}
- Cyrtopogon ruficornis (Fabricius, 1794)^{c g}
- Cyrtopogon rufitibialis Bigot, 1878^{c g}
- Cyrtopogon rufotarsus Back, 1909^{i c g}
- Cyrtopogon sabroskyi Lavigne and Bullington, 1981^{i c g}
- Cyrtopogon sansoni Curran, 1923^{i c g}
- Cyrtopogon saxicola Lehr, 1998^{c g}
- Cyrtopogon semitarius Melander, 1923^{c g}
- Cyrtopogon skopini Lehr, 1998^{c g}
- Cyrtopogon stenofrons Wilcox and Martin, 1936^{i c g}
- Cyrtopogon sudator Osten Sacken, 1877^{i c g b}
- Cyrtopogon svaneticus Lehr, 1998^{c g}
- Cyrtopogon swezeyi Wilcox and Martin, 1936^{i c g}
- Cyrtopogon tarbagataicus Lehr, 1998^{c g}
- Cyrtopogon tenuibarbus Loew, 1856^{c g}
- Cyrtopogon tenuis Bromley, 1924^{i c g}
- Cyrtopogon thompsoni Cole, 1921^{i c g}
- Cyrtopogon tibialis Coquillett, 1904^{i c g}
- Cyrtopogon transiliensis Lehr, 1998^{c g}
- Cyrtopogon turgenicus Lehr, 1998^{c g}
- Cyrtopogon vanduzeei Wilcox and Martin, 1936^{i c g}
- Cyrtopogon vandykei Wilcox and Martin, 1936^{i c g}
- Cyrtopogon varans Curran, 1923^{i c g}
- Cyrtopogon varicornis Bezzi, 1899^{c g}
- Cyrtopogon villosus Lehr, 1998^{c g}
- Cyrtopogon vulneratus Melander, 1923^{i c g}
- Cyrtopogon wilcoxi James, 1942^{c g}
- Cyrtopogon willistoni Curran, 1922^{i c g b}

Data sources: i = ITIS, c = Catalogue of Life, g = GBIF, b = Bugguide.net
