= Cyrtopogon =

Cyrtopogon may refer to:

- Cyrtopogon (fly), a genus of flies in the family Asilidae
- Cyrtopogon (plant), a genus of plants in the family Poaceae
