= Cyrtopogon falto =

Scientific classification
- Kingdom: Animalia
- Phylum: Arthropoda
- Class: Insecta
- Order: Diptera
- Family: Asilidae
- Genus: Cyrtopogon
- Species: C. falto

Binomial name
- Cyrtopogon falto (Walker, 1849)

Synonyms
- Cyrtopogon chrysopogon Loew, 1866; Dasypogon falto Walker, 1849

Species of fly

Cyrtopogon falto is a species of robber flies in the family Asilidae.
