= Cyrtopogon montanus =

Scientific classification
- Domain: Eukaryota
- Kingdom: Animalia
- Phylum: Arthropoda
- Class: Insecta
- Order: Diptera
- Family: Asilidae
- Genus: Cyrtopogon
- Species: C. montanus

Binomial name
- Cyrtopogon montanus Loew, 1874

Synonyms
- Cyrtopogon leucozonus Loew, 1874

Species of fly

Cyrtopogon montanus is a species of robber flies in the family Asilidae.

== Subspecies ==
These two subspecies belong to the species Cyrtopogon montanus:

- Cyrtopogon montanus montanus Loew, 1874^{i g}
- Cyrtopogon montanus wilcoxi James, 1942^{i g}

Data sources: i = ITIS, c = Catalogue of Life, g = GBIF, b = Bugguide.net
