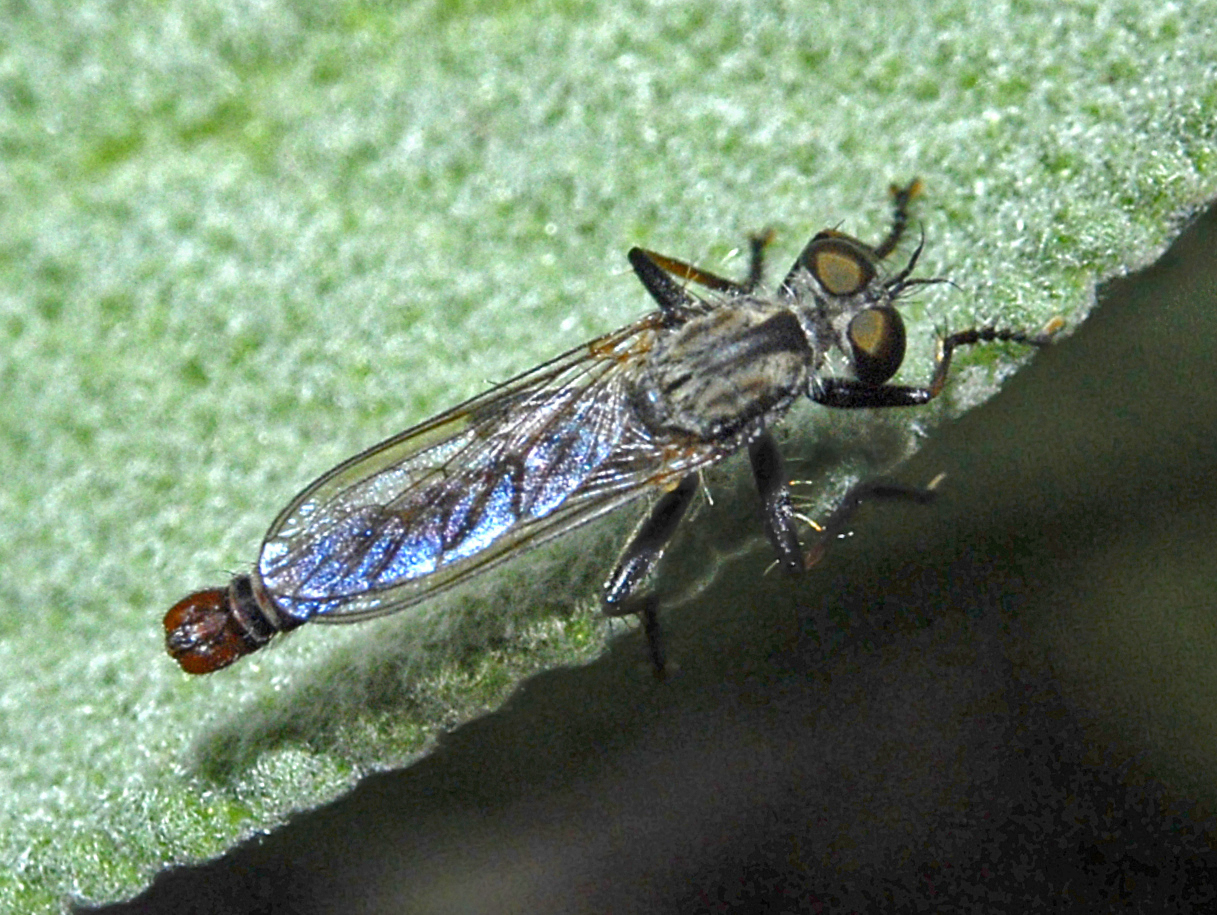
- Male, dorsal view
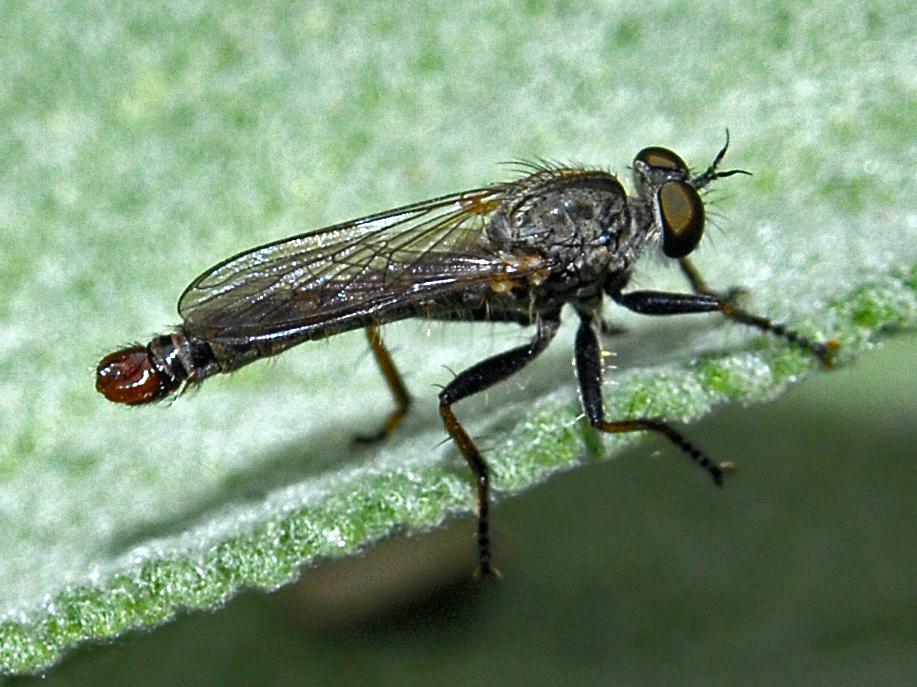
- Male, side view

Scientific classification
- Kingdom: Animalia
- Phylum: Arthropoda
- Class: Insecta
- Order: Diptera
- Family: Asilidae
- Genus: Cerdistus
- Species: C. erythrurus

Binomial name
- Cerdistus erythrurus (Meigen, 1820)

Synonyms
- Asilus erythrurus Meigen, 1820

= Cerdistus erythrurus =

Species of fly

Cerdistus erythrurus is a species of robber fly in the subfamily Asilinae. It is the type species of the genus Cerdistus.

== Distribution ==
This species is present in Southern Europe (Austria, Bosnia and Herzegovina, Croatia, France, Greece, Italy, Switzerland and former Yugoslavia).

== Description ==
Cerdistus erythrurus can reach a body length of about 8–9 millimetres (0.31–0.35 in). These rather little robber flies are mainly black. Legs are black, with reddish tibiae. In males the modified last abdominal segment supporting the copulatory apparatus (hypopygium) may be partly reddish.

Adults can be found from May to July–August.
