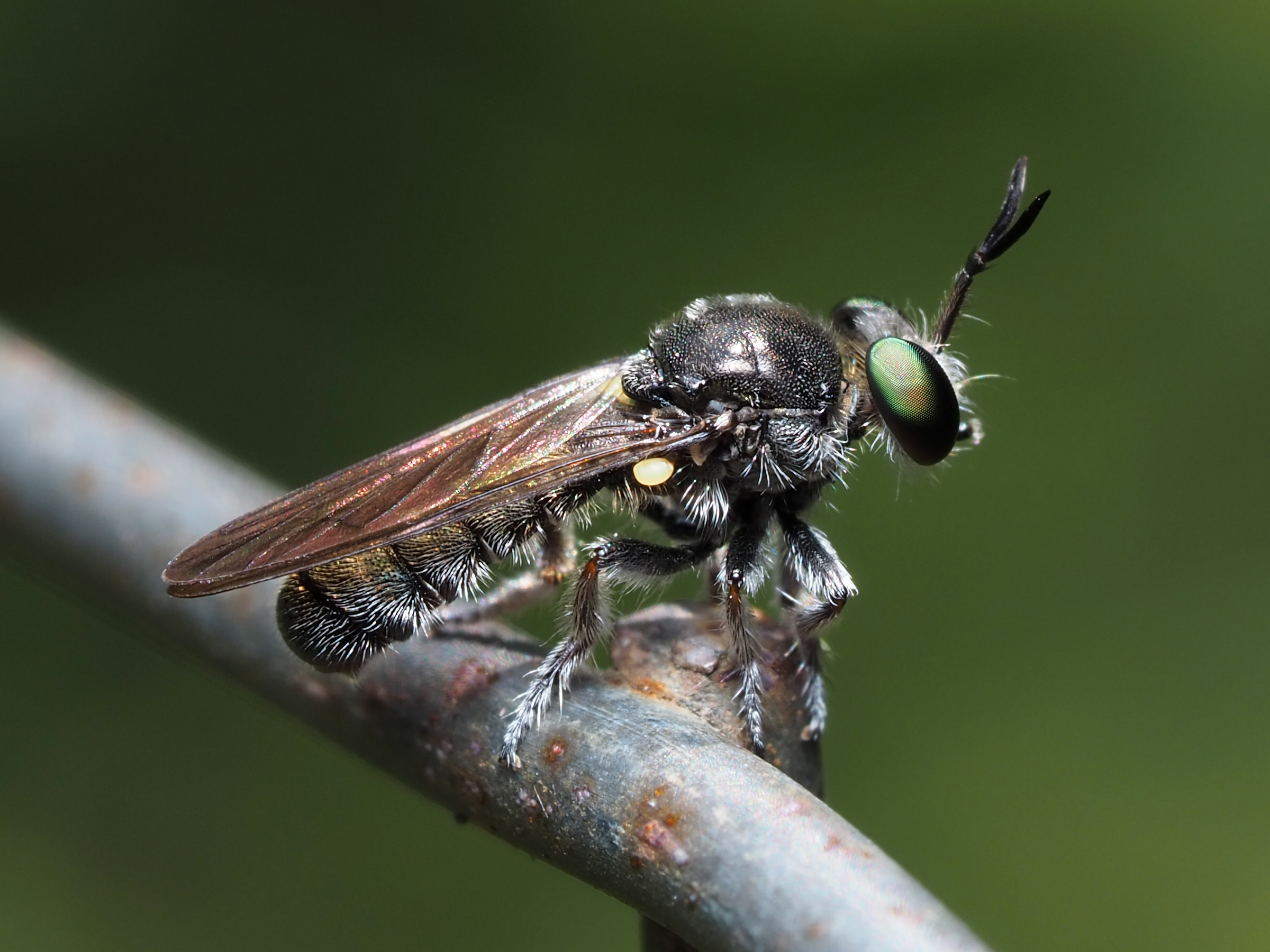
- Cerotainia sp.

Scientific classification
- Domain: Eukaryota
- Kingdom: Animalia
- Phylum: Arthropoda
- Class: Insecta
- Order: Diptera
- Family: Asilidae
- Subfamily: Laphriinae
- Genus: Cerotainia; Schiner, 1866

= Cerotainia =

Genus of flies

Cerotainia is a genus of robber flies in the family Asilidae. There are at least 30 described species in Cerotainia.

== Species ==
These 32 species belong to the genus Cerotainia:

- Cerotainia albipilosa Curran, 1930^{i c g b}
- Cerotainia argyropasta Hermann, 1912^{c g}
- Cerotainia argyropus Schiner, 1868
- Cerotainia argyropyga Hermann, 1912^{c g}
- Cerotainia atrata Jones, 1907^{i c g}
- Cerotainia aurata Schiner, 1868
- Cerotainia bella Schiner, 1867^{c g}
- Cerotainia brasiliensis Schiner, 1867^{c g}
- Cerotainia camposi Curran, 1934^{c g}
- Cerotainia dasythrix Hermann, 1912^{c g}
- Cerotainia debilis Hermann, 1912^{c g}
- Cerotainia dubia Bigot, 1878^{c g}
- Cerotainia feminea Curran, 1930^{c g}
- Cerotainia flavipes Hermann, 1912^{c g}
- Cerotainia jamaicensis Johnson, 1919^{c g}
- Cerotainia laticeps Bromley, 1929^{c g}
- Cerotainia leonina Hermann, 1912^{c g}
- Cerotainia macrocera (Say, 1823)^{i c g b}
- Cerotainia marginata Hermann, 1912^{c g}
- Cerotainia melanosoma Scarbrough & Knutson, 1989^{c g}
- Cerotainia minima Curran, 1930^{c g}
- Cerotainia nigra Bigot, 1878^{c g}
- Cerotainia nigripennis (Bellardi, 1861)^{c g}
- Cerotainia ornatipes James, 1953^{c g}
- Cerotainia propinqua Schiner, 1868
- Cerotainia rhopalocera (Lynch Arribalzaga, 1882)^{c g}
- Cerotainia sarae Rueda, 1998^{c g}
- Cerotainia sola Scarbrough & Perez-Gelabert, 2006^{c g}
- Cerotainia unicolor Hermann, 1912^{c g}
- Cerotainia violaceithorax Lynch Arribalzaga, 1880^{c g}
- Cerotainia willistoni Curran, 1930^{c g}
- Cerotainia xanthoptera (Wiedemann, 1828)^{c}

Data sources: i = ITIS, c = Catalogue of Life, g = GBIF, b = Bugguide.net
