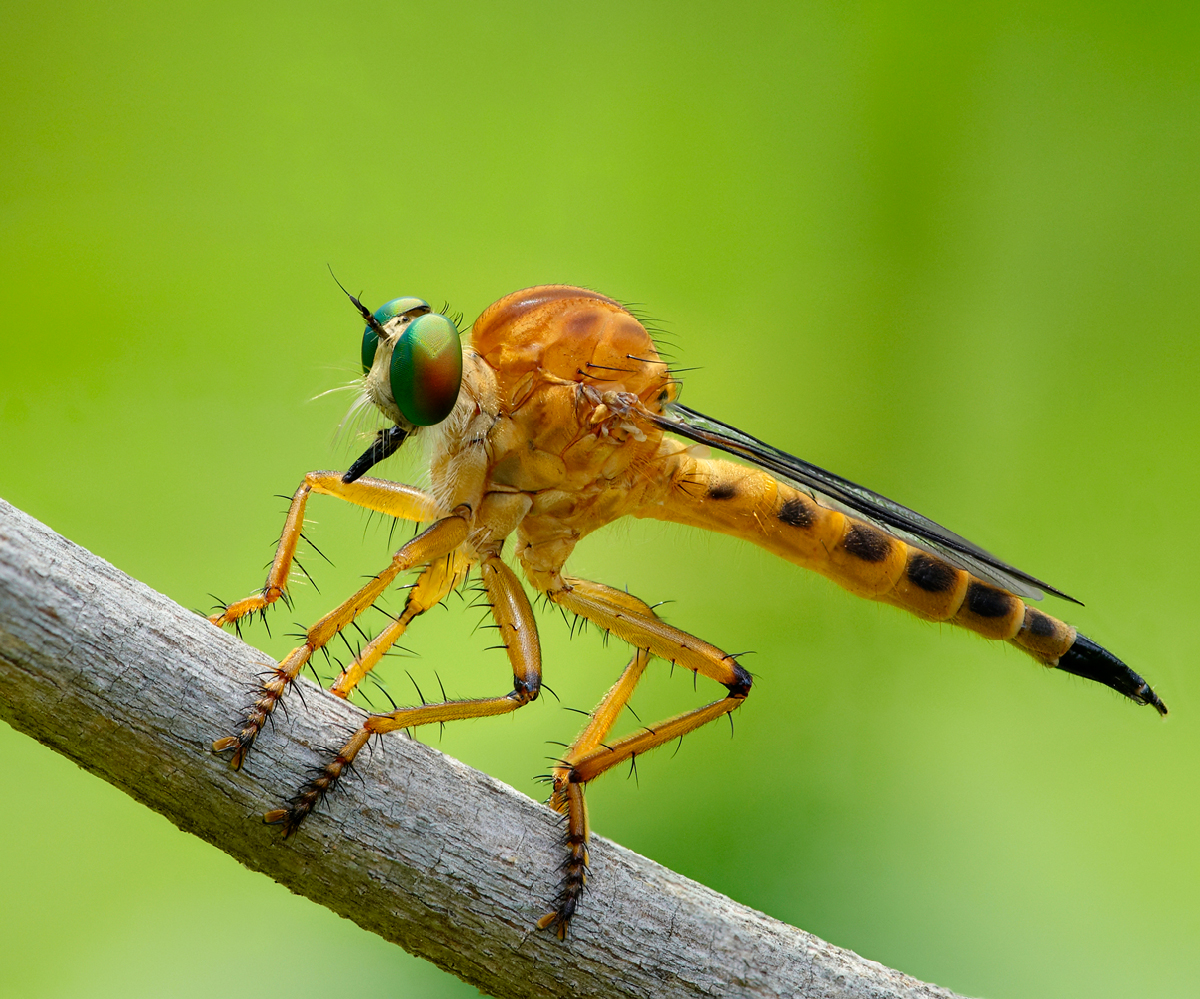
- Clephydroneura sp. from Laos

Scientific classification
- Domain: Eukaryota
- Kingdom: Animalia
- Phylum: Arthropoda
- Class: Insecta
- Order: Diptera
- Family: Asilidae
- Genus: Clephydroneura; Becker, 1925

= Clephydroneura =

Genus of flies

Clephydroneura is a genus of robberfly found mainly in tropical Asia. There are numerous species which can only be identified to species by dissection of the genitalia of males.

An incomplete list of species that have been described in this genus includes:

- Clephydroneura alveolusa Shi, 1995
- Clephydroneura anamalaiensis Joseph & Parui, 1979
- Clephydroneura annulatus Fabricius, 1775
- Clephydroneura apicalis Oldroyd, 1938
- Clephydroneura apicihirta Shi, 1995
- Clephydroneura bangalorensis Joseph & Parui, 1984
- Clephydroneura bannerghattaensis Joseph & Parui, 1984
- Clephydroneura bella Shi, 1995
- Clephydroneura bengalensis Macquart, 1838
- Clephydroneura bidensa Shi, 1995
- Clephydroneura brevipennis Oldroyd, 1938
- Clephydroneura cilia Shi, 1995
- Clephydroneura cochinensis Oldroyd, 1938
- Clephydroneura cristata Oldroyd, 1938
- Clephydroneura cylindra Shi, 1995
- Clephydroneura dasi Parui & Das, 1995
- Clephydroneura distincta Oldroyd, 1938
- Clephydroneura duvaucelii Macquart, 1838
- Clephydroneura exilis Oldroyd, 1938
- Clephydroneura finita Scarbrough, 2004
- Clephydroneura flavicornis Macquart, 1838
- Clephydroneura fulvihirta Shi, 1995
- Clephydroneura furca Scarbrough, 2004
- Clephydroneura ghorpadei Joseph & Parui, 1984
- Clephydroneura ghoshi Parui & Das, 1995
- Clephydroneura gravelyi Joseph & Parui, 1979
- Clephydroneura gymmura Oldroyd, 1938
- Clephydroneura hainanensis Jiang, 1988
- Clephydroneura hamiforceps Shi, 1995
- Clephydroneura indiana Joseph & Parui, 1979
- Clephydroneura involuta Scarbrough, 2004
- Clephydroneura karikalensis Parui & Das, 1995
- Clephydroneura karnatakensis Joseph & Parui, 1984
- Clephydroneura lali Joseph & Parui, 1979
- Clephydroneura martini Joseph & Parui, 1979
- Clephydroneura minor Oldroyd, 1938
- Clephydroneura mudigorensis Joseph & Parui, 1984
- Clephydroneura mysorensis Joseph & Parui, 1984
- Clephydroneura nelsoni Joseph & Parui, 1979
- Clephydroneura nigrata Shi, 1995
- Clephydroneura nilaparvata Joseph & Parui, 1979
- Clephydroneura oldroydi Joseph & Parui, 1995
- Clephydroneura promboonae Tomasovic & Grootaert, 2003
- Clephydroneura pulla Oldroyd, 1938
- Clephydroneura robusta Joseph & Parui, 1984
- Clephydroneura rossi Joseph & Parui, 1995
- Clephydroneura semirufa Oldroyd, 1938
- Clephydroneura serrula Tomasovic & Bartolozzi, 2018
- Clephydroneura singhi Joseph & Parui, 1999
- Clephydroneura sundaica Jaennicke, 1867
- Clephydroneura trifissura Shi, 1995
- Clephydroneura valida Scarbrough, 2004
- Clephydroneura wilcoxi Joseph & Parui, 1979
- Clephydroneura xanthopa Wiedemann, 1819
- Clephydroneura xanthopha Wiedemann, 1819
