= Cyrtopogon bimacula =

Scientific classification
- Kingdom: Animalia
- Phylum: Arthropoda
- Class: Insecta
- Order: Diptera
- Family: Asilidae
- Genus: Cyrtopogon
- Species: C. bimacula

Binomial name
- Cyrtopogon bimacula (Walker, 1851)

Synonyms
- Euarmostus bimacula Walker, 1851

Species of fly

Cyrtopogon bimacula is a species of robber flies in the family Asilidae.
