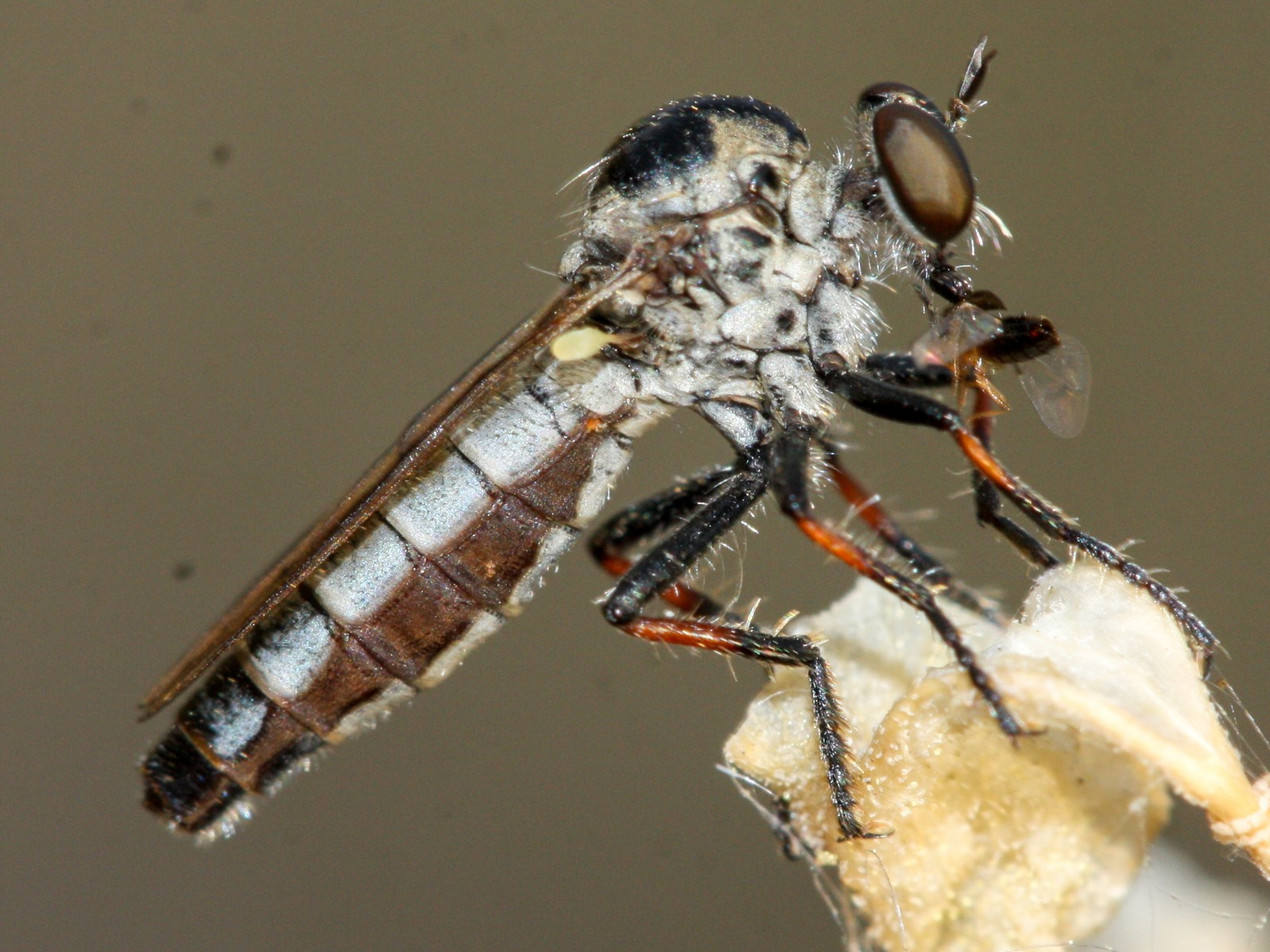

Scientific classification
- Domain: Eukaryota
- Kingdom: Animalia
- Phylum: Arthropoda
- Class: Insecta
- Order: Diptera
- Family: Asilidae
- Subfamily: Dasypogoninae
- Genus: Cophura; Osten Sacken, 1887

= Cophura =

Genus of flies

Cophura is a genus of robber flies in the family Asilidae. There are at least 50 species described in the genus Cophura.

== Species ==
These 54 species belong to the genus Cophura:

- Cophura acapulcae Pritchard, 1943^{c g}
- Cophura ameles Pritchard, 1943^{i c g}
- Cophura apotma Pritchard, 1943^{c g}
- Cophura arizonensis (Schaeffer, 1916)^{i c g b}
- Cophura atypha Pritchard, 1943^{c g}
- Cophura bella (Loew, 1872)^{i c g b}
- Cophura brevicornis (Williston, 1883)^{c g b}
- Cophura caca Pritchard, 1943^{i c g}
- Cophura calla Pritchard, 1943^{c g}
- Cophura clausa (Coquillett, 1893)^{i c g}
- Cophura cora Pritchard, 1943^{c g}
- Cophura dammersi Wilcox, 1965^{i g}
- Cophura daphne Pritchard, 1943^{i c g}
- Cophura dora Pritchard, 1943^{i c g}
- Cophura feigei Kaletta, 1983^{c g}
- Cophura fergusoni Wilcox, 1965^{i c g}
- Cophura fisheri Wilcox, 1965^{i c g}
- Cophura flavus Wilcox, 1965^{c g}
- Cophura fur (Williston, 1885)^{i c g}
- Cophura getzendaneri Wilcox, 1959^{i c g}
- Cophura hennei Wilcox and Martin, 1945^{i c g}
- Cophura hesperia (Pritchard, 1935)^{i c g}
- Cophura humilis (Bellardi, 1861)^{c}
- Cophura hurdi Hull, 1960^{i c g}
- Cophura igualae Pritchard, 1943^{c g}
- Cophura luteus Wilcox, 1965^{c g}
- Cophura lutzi Curran, 1931^{c g}
- Cophura luzti (Curran, 1931)^{i g}
- Cophura melanochaeta Williston, 1924^{c g}
- Cophura nephressa Pritchard, 1943^{c g}
- Cophura painteri Pritchard, 1943^{i c g b}
- Cophura picta Carrera, 1955^{c g}
- Cophura pollinosa Curran, 1930^{i c g b}
- Cophura powersi Wilcox, 1965^{i c g}
- Cophura pulchella Williston, 1901^{i c g}
- Cophura rozeni Wilcox, 1965^{i c g}
- Cophura rubidus Wilcox, 1965^{c g}
- Cophura scitula Williston^{i c g}
- Cophura sculleni Wilcox, 1937^{i c g}
- Cophura sodalis Osten Sacken, 1887^{i c g}
- Cophura stylosa Curran, 1931^{i c g}
- Cophura sundra Pritchard, 1943^{c g}
- Cophura tanbarki Wilcox, 1965^{i c g}
- Cophura texana Bromley, 1934^{i c g}
- Cophura timberlakei Wilcox, 1965^{i c g}
- Cophura tolandi Wilcox, 1959^{i c g b}
- Cophura trunca (Coquillett, 1893)^{i c g}
- Cophura vanduzeei Wilcox, 1965^{i c g}
- Cophura vandykei Wilcox, 1965^{i c g b}
- Cophura vera (Pritchard, 1935)^{i c g}
- Cophura vitripennis (Curran, 1927)^{i c g}
- Cophura wilcoxi Kaletta, 1983^{c g}
- Cophura willistoni Pritchard, 1943^{c g}
- Cophura zandra Pritchard, 1943^{c g}

Data sources: i = ITIS, c = Catalogue of Life, g = GBIF, b = Bugguide.net
