= Callinicus calcaneus =

Scientific classification
- Domain: Eukaryota
- Kingdom: Animalia
- Phylum: Arthropoda
- Class: Insecta
- Order: Diptera
- Family: Asilidae
- Genus: Callinicus
- Species: C. calcaneus

Binomial name
- Callinicus calcaneus Loew, 1872

Synonyms
- Dasypogon bilimbatum Bigot, 1878

Species of fly

Callinicus calcaneus is a species of robber flies in the family Asilidae. They are known predators of solitary bees of the families Megachilidae and Andrenidae.
