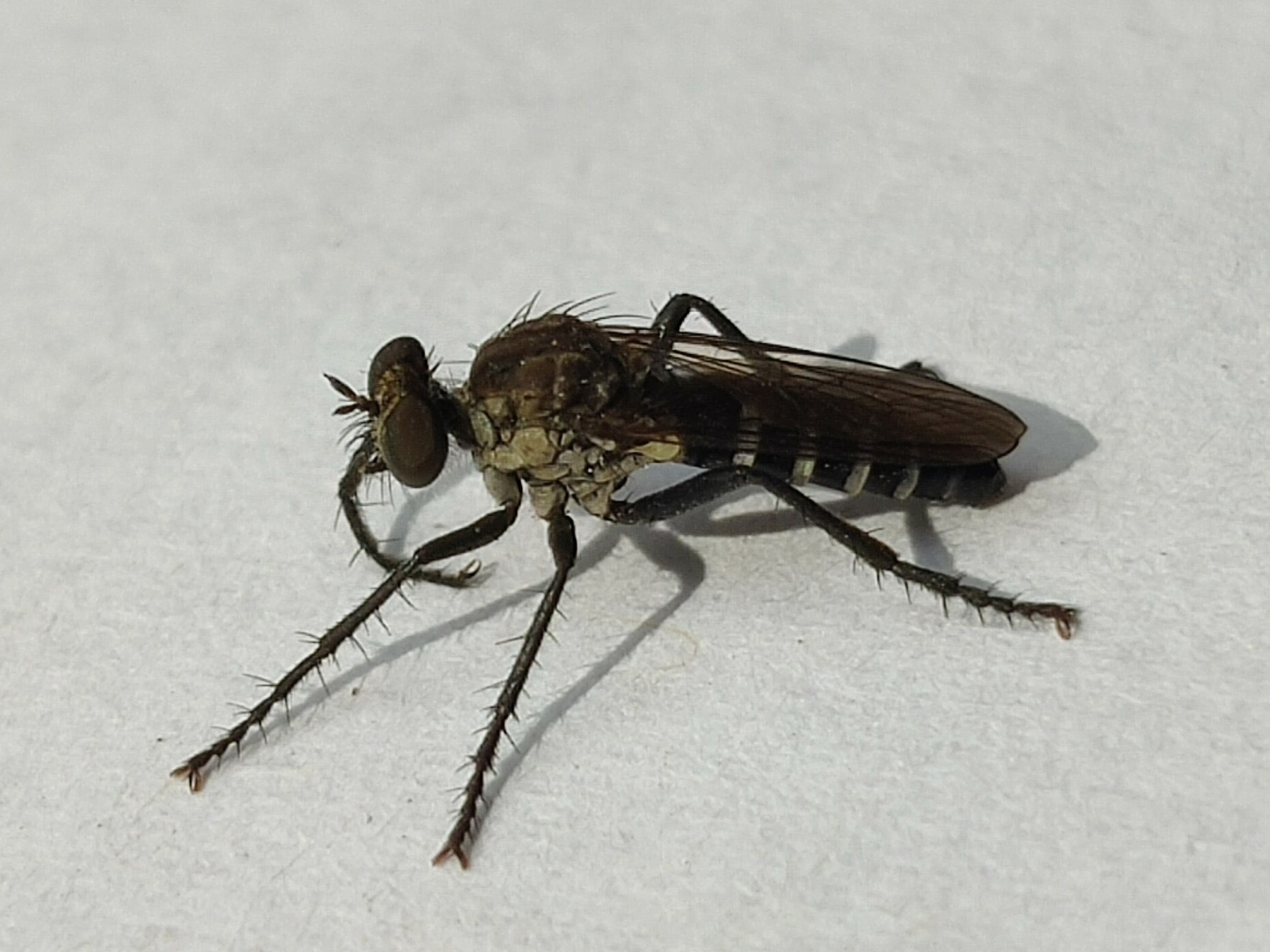
- Coleomyia setigera

Scientific classification
- Kingdom: Animalia
- Phylum: Arthropoda
- Clade: Pancrustacea
- Class: Insecta
- Order: Diptera
- Family: Asilidae
- Subfamily: Stenopogoninae
- Genus: Coleomyia; Wilcox & Martin, 1935

= Coleomyia =

Genus of flies

Coleomyia is a genus of robber flies in the family Asilidae. There are about eight described species in Coleomyia.

== Species ==
These eight species belong to the genus Coleomyia:

- Coleomyia albula (Melander, 1924)
- Coleomyia alticola James, 1941
- Coleomyia crumborum Martin, 1953
- Coleomyia hinei Wilcox & Martin, 1935
- Coleomyia rainieri Wilcox & Martin, 1935
- Coleomyia rubida Martin, 1953
- Coleomyia sculleni Wilcox & Martin, 1935
- Coleomyia setigera (Cole, 1919)
