= Cophura arizonensis =

Scientific classification
- Domain: Eukaryota
- Kingdom: Animalia
- Phylum: Arthropoda
- Class: Insecta
- Order: Diptera
- Family: Asilidae
- Genus: Cophura
- Species: C. arizonensis

Binomial name
- Cophura arizonensis (Schaeffer, 1916)

Synonyms
- Buckellia drakei Pritchard, 1935; Lasiopogon arizonensis Schaeffer, 1916

Species of fly

Cophura arizonensis is a species of robber flies in the family Asilidae.
