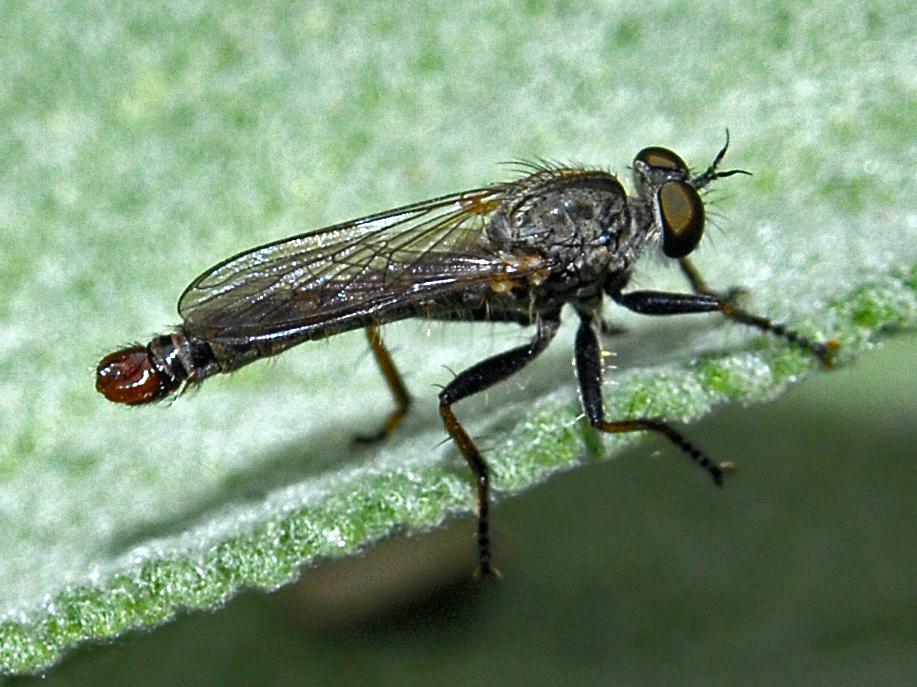
- Cerdistus erythrurus

Scientific classification
- Kingdom: Animalia
- Phylum: Arthropoda
- Class: Insecta
- Order: Diptera
- Family: Asilidae
- Subfamily: Asilinae
- Genus: Cerdistus; Loew, 1849

Species
- See text

= Cerdistus =

Genus of flies

Cerdistus is a genus of robber flies in the subfamily Asilinae.

== Species ==
- Cerdistus acuminatus (Theodor, 1980)
- Cerdistus antilco (Walker, 1849)
- Cerdistus australasiae (Schiner, 1868)
- Cerdistus australis (Macquart, 1847)
- Cerdistus australis (Lehr, 1967)
- Cerdistus begauxi (Tomasovic, 2005)
- Cerdistus blascozumetai (Weinberg & Bächli, 1975)
- Cerdistus claripes (White, 1918)
- Cerdistus coedicus (Walker, 1849)
- Cerdistus creticus (Hüttinger & Hradský, 1983)
- Cerdistus cygnis (Dakin & Fordham, 1922)
- Cerdistus dactylopygus (Janssens, 1968)
- Cerdistus debilis (Becker, 1923)
- Cerdistus desertorum (Efflatoun, 1934)
- Cerdistus elegans (Bigot, 1888)
- Cerdistus elicitus (Walker, 1851)
- Cerdistus erythruroides (Theodor, 1980)
- Cerdistus erythrurus (Meigen, 1820)
- Cerdistus exilis (Macquart, 1838)
- Cerdistus flavicinctus (White, 1914)
- Cerdistus graminis (White, 1914)
- Cerdistus hermonensis (Theodor, 1980)
- Cerdistus indifferens (Becker, 1923)
- Cerdistus jubatus (Becker, 1923)
- Cerdistus laetus (Becker, 1925)
- Cerdistus lativentris (Pandellé, 1905)
- Cerdistus lautus (White, 1918)
- Cerdistus lekesi (Moucha & Hradský, 1963)
- Cerdistus lividus (White, 1918)
- Cerdistus manii (Schiner, 1867)
- Cerdistus maricus (Walker, 1851)
- Cerdistus melanomerus (Tsacas, 1964)
- Cerdistus mellis (Macquart, 1838)
- Cerdistus novus (Lehr, 1995)
- Cerdistus olympianus (Janssens, 1959)
- Cerdistus pallidus (Efflatoun, 1927)
- Cerdistus prostratus (Hardy, 1935)
- Cerdistus rectangularis (Theodor, 1980)
- Cerdistus rufometatarsus (Macquart, 1855)
- Cerdistus rusticanoides (Hardy, 1926)
- Cerdistus rusticanus (White, 1918)
- Cerdistus santoriensis (Hüttinger & Hradský, 1983)
- Cerdistus separatus (Hardy, 1935)
- Cerdistus setifemoratus (Macquart, 1855)
- Cerdistus setosus (Hardy, 1920)
- Cerdistus sugonjaevi (Lehr, 1967)
- Cerdistus villicatus (Walker, 1851)
