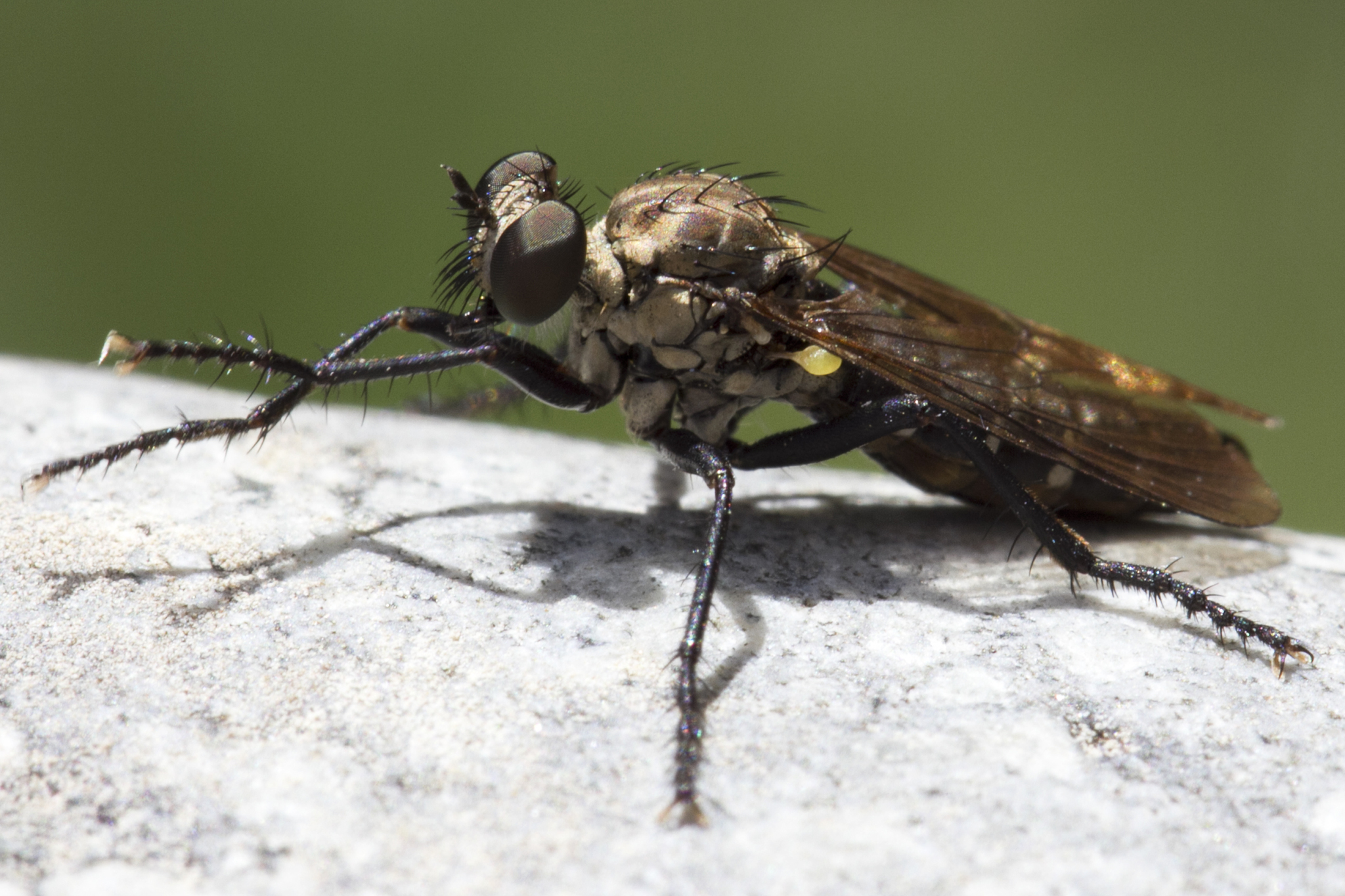

Scientific classification
- Kingdom: Animalia
- Phylum: Arthropoda
- Clade: Pancrustacea
- Class: Insecta
- Order: Diptera
- Family: Asilidae
- Genus: Coleomyia
- Species: C. alticola

Binomial name
- Coleomyia alticola James, 1941

= Coleomyia alticola =

Species of fly

Coleomyia alticola is a species of robber flies in the family Asilidae.
