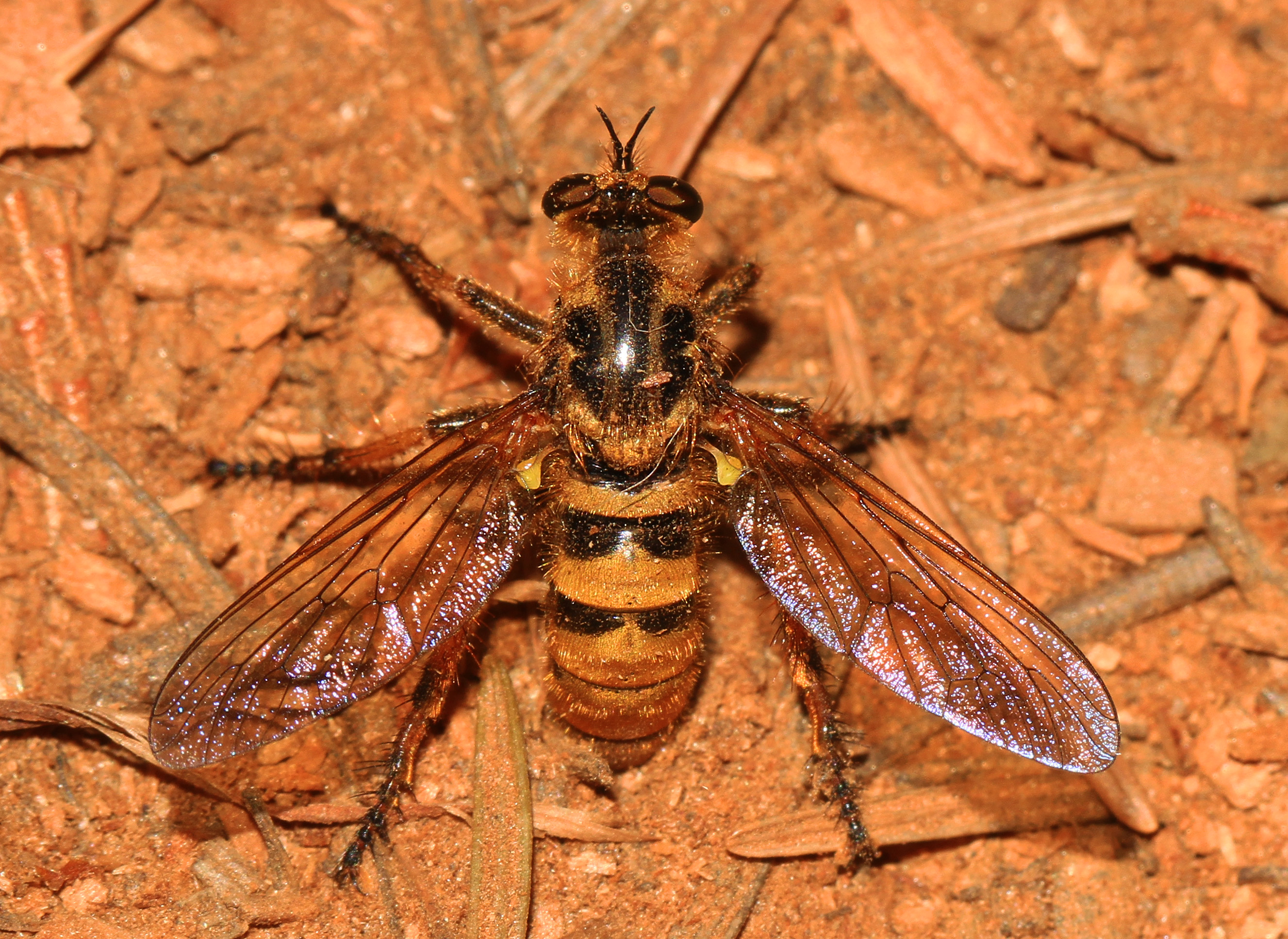

Scientific classification
- Domain: Eukaryota
- Kingdom: Animalia
- Phylum: Arthropoda
- Class: Insecta
- Order: Diptera
- Family: Asilidae
- Genus: Callinicus
- Species: C. pollenius

Binomial name
- Callinicus pollenius (Cole, 1919)

Synonyms
- Chrysoceria pollenia Cole, 1919

= Callinicus pollenius =

Species of fly

Callinicus pollenius is a species of robber flies in the family Asilidae.
