= Cophura painteri =

Scientific classification
- Domain: Eukaryota
- Kingdom: Animalia
- Phylum: Arthropoda
- Class: Insecta
- Order: Diptera
- Family: Asilidae
- Genus: Cophura
- Species: C. painteri

Binomial name
- Cophura painteri Pritchard, 1943

Species of fly

Cophura painteri is a species of robber flies in the family Asilidae.
