= Cophura pollinosa =

Scientific classification
- Domain: Eukaryota
- Kingdom: Animalia
- Phylum: Arthropoda
- Class: Insecta
- Order: Diptera
- Family: Asilidae
- Genus: Cophura
- Species: C. pollinosa

Binomial name
- Cophura pollinosa Curran, 1930

Species of fly

Cophura pollinosa is a species of robber flies in the family Asilidae.
