= Cophura bella =

Scientific classification
- Domain: Eukaryota
- Kingdom: Animalia
- Phylum: Arthropoda
- Class: Insecta
- Order: Diptera
- Family: Asilidae
- Genus: Cophura
- Species: C. bella

Binomial name
- Cophura bella (Loew, 1872)

Synonyms
- Blax bellus Loew, 1872

Species of fly

Cophura bella is a species of robber flies in the family Asilidae.
