= Cyrtopogon willistoni =

Scientific classification
- Domain: Eukaryota
- Kingdom: Animalia
- Phylum: Arthropoda
- Class: Insecta
- Order: Diptera
- Family: Asilidae
- Genus: Cyrtopogon
- Species: C. willistoni

Binomial name
- Cyrtopogon willistoni Curran, 1922

Species of fly

Cyrtopogon willistoni is a species of robber flies in the family Asilidae.
