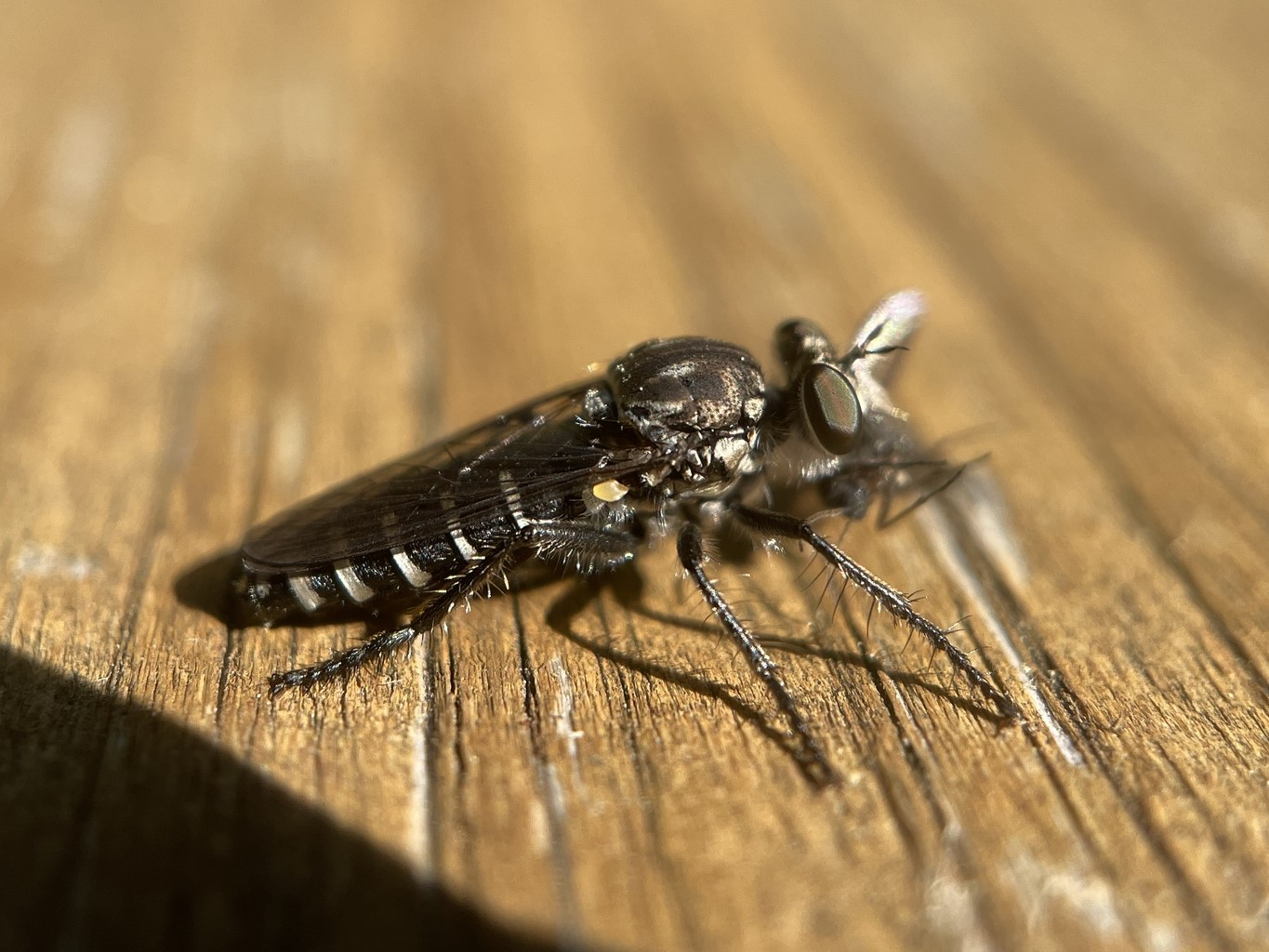

Scientific classification
- Kingdom: Animalia
- Phylum: Arthropoda
- Class: Insecta
- Order: Diptera
- Family: Asilidae
- Genus: Cyrtopogon
- Species: C. lutatius

Binomial name
- Cyrtopogon lutatius (Walker, 1849)

Synonyms
- Dasypogon lutatius Walker, 1849

= Cyrtopogon lutatius =

Species of fly

Cyrtopogon lutatius is a species of robber fly in the family Asilidae.
