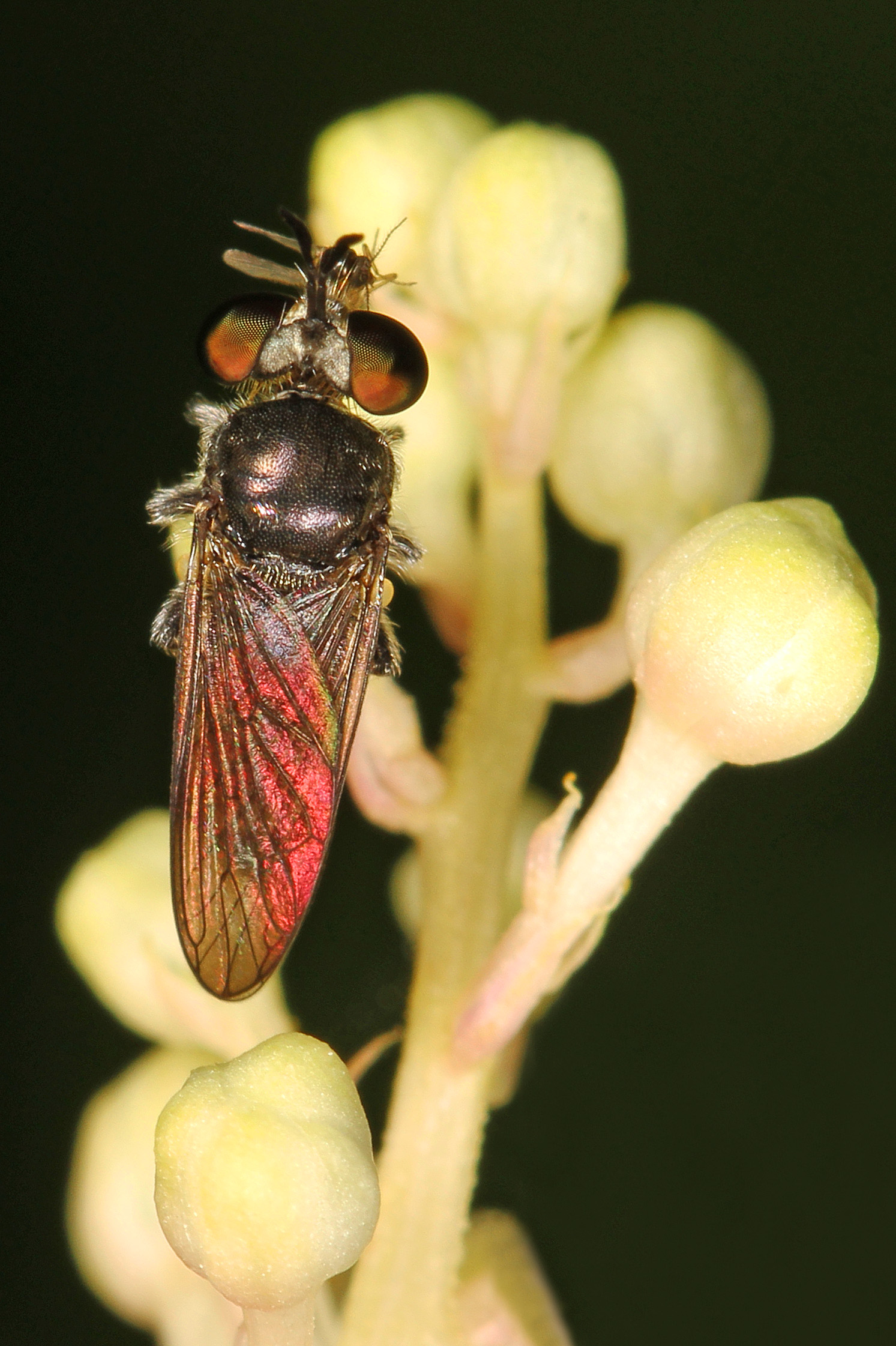

Scientific classification
- Domain: Eukaryota
- Kingdom: Animalia
- Phylum: Arthropoda
- Class: Insecta
- Order: Diptera
- Family: Asilidae
- Genus: Cerotainia
- Species: C. albipilosa

Binomial name
- Cerotainia albipilosa Curran, 1930

= Cerotainia albipilosa =

Species of fly

Cerotainia albipilosa is a species of robber flies in the family Asilidae.

Identification:
