= Cyrtopogon marginalis =

Scientific classification
- Domain: Eukaryota
- Kingdom: Animalia
- Phylum: Arthropoda
- Class: Insecta
- Order: Diptera
- Family: Asilidae
- Genus: Cyrtopogon
- Species: C. marginalis

Binomial name
- Cyrtopogon marginalis Loew, 1866

Species of fly

Cyrtopogon marginalis is a species of robber flies, also called assassin flies, in the family Asilidae.
