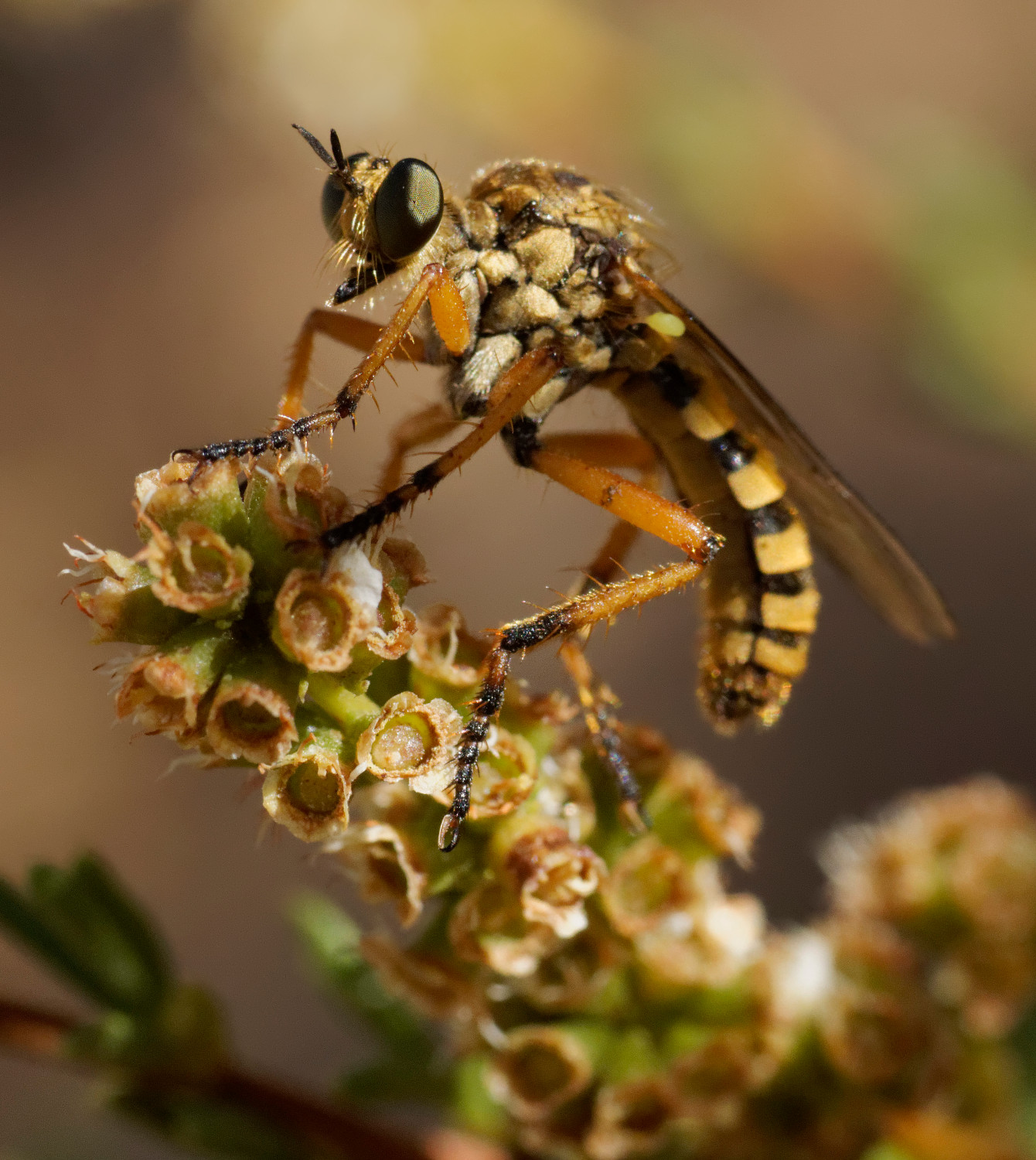

Scientific classification
- Kingdom: Animalia
- Phylum: Arthropoda
- Class: Insecta
- Order: Diptera
- Family: Asilidae
- Genus: Callinicus
- Species: C. pictitarsis

Binomial name
- Callinicus pictitarsis (Bigot, 1878)

Synonyms
- Laparus pictitarsis Bigot, 1878

= Callinicus pictitarsis =

Species of fly

Callinicus pictitarsis is a species of robber flies in the family Asilidae.
