= Cerdistus elegans =

Scientific classification
- Kingdom: Animalia
- Phylum: Arthropoda
- Class: Insecta
- Order: Diptera
- Family: Asilidae
- Genus: Cerdistus
- Species: C. elegans

Binomial name
- Cerdistus elegans (Bigot, 1888)

Species of fly

Cerdistus elegans is a species of robber flies in the subfamily Asilinae. It is found in Tunisia.
