= Cophura daphne =

Scientific classification
- Kingdom: Animalia
- Phylum: Arthropoda
- Class: Insecta
- Order: Diptera
- Family: Asilidae
- Genus: Cophura
- Species: C. daphne

Binomial name
- Cophura daphne Pritchard, 1943

Species of robber fly

Cophura daphne is a species of robber fly in the family Asilidae.
