= Cophura brevicornis =

Scientific classification
- Domain: Eukaryota
- Kingdom: Animalia
- Phylum: Arthropoda
- Class: Insecta
- Order: Diptera
- Family: Asilidae
- Genus: Cophura
- Species: C. brevicornis

Binomial name
- Cophura brevicornis Williston, 1883

Species of robber fly

Cophura brevicornis is a species of robber fly in the family Asilidae.
