= Cophura vandykei =

Scientific classification
- Domain: Eukaryota
- Kingdom: Animalia
- Phylum: Arthropoda
- Class: Insecta
- Order: Diptera
- Family: Asilidae
- Genus: Cophura
- Species: C. vandykei

Binomial name
- Cophura vandykei Wilcox, 1965

Species of fly

Cophura vandykei is a species of robber flies in the family Asilidae.
