= Cophura atypha =

Scientific classification
- Domain: Eukaryota
- Kingdom: Animalia
- Phylum: Arthropoda
- Class: Insecta
- Order: Diptera
- Family: Asilidae
- Genus: Cophura
- Species: C. atypha

Binomial name
- Cophura atypha Pritchard, 1943

Species of bee fly

Cophura atypha is a species of robber fly in the family Asilidae, first described by Pritchard in 1943. Like other members of the genus Cophura, It behaves as a predator, capturing and feeding on other insects. This species is responsible for maintaining the ecological balance by regulating the populations of its prey..
