= Cophura tolandi =

Scientific classification
- Domain: Eukaryota
- Kingdom: Animalia
- Phylum: Arthropoda
- Class: Insecta
- Order: Diptera
- Family: Asilidae
- Genus: Cophura
- Species: C. tolandi

Binomial name
- Cophura tolandi Wilcox, 1959

Species of fly

Cophura tolandi is a species of robber flies in the family Asilidae.
