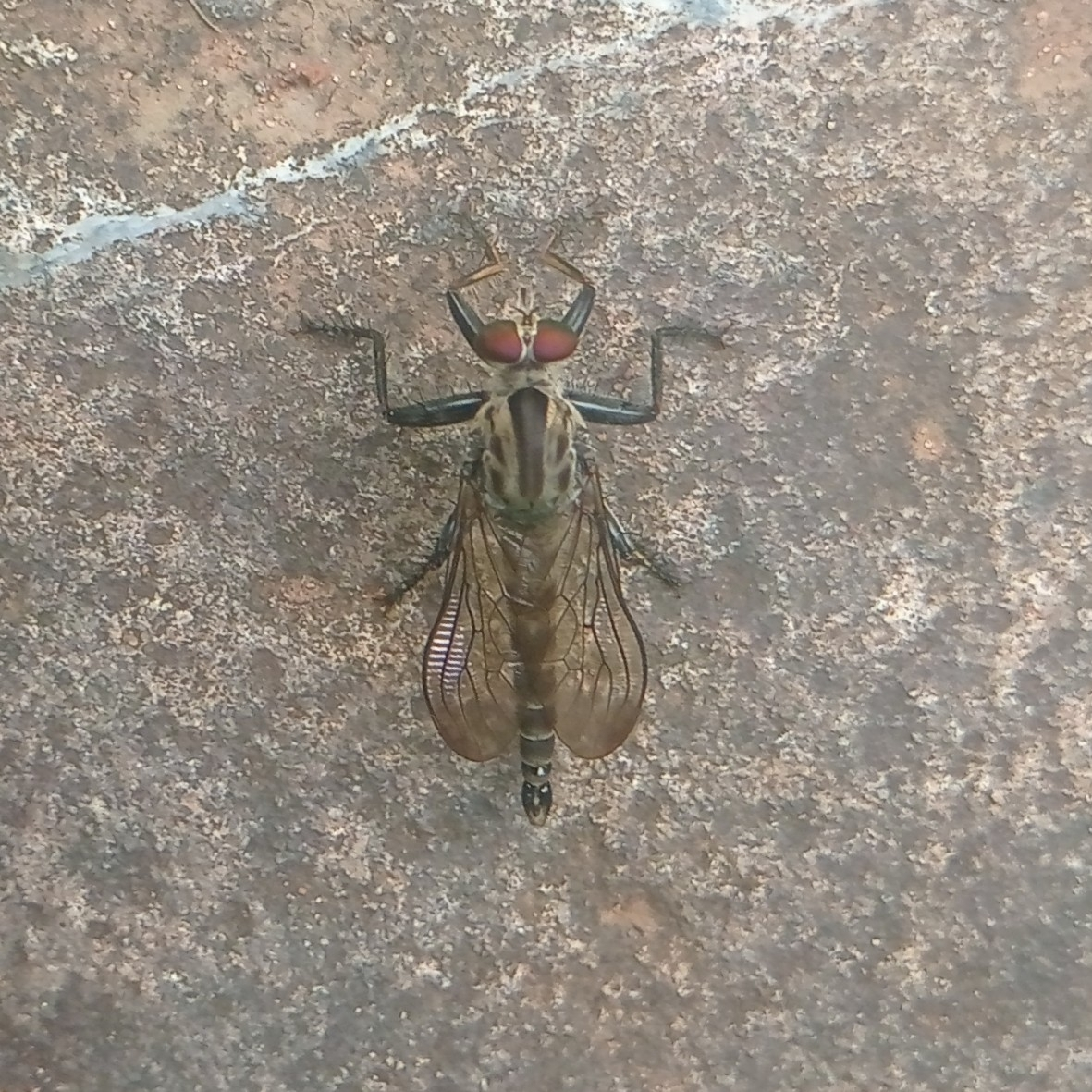

Scientific classification
- Kingdom: Animalia
- Phylum: Arthropoda
- Class: Insecta
- Order: Diptera
- Superfamily: Asiloidea
- Family: Asilidae
- Genus: Clephydroneura
- Species: C. pulla

Binomial name
- Clephydroneura pulla Oldroyd, 1938

= Clephydroneura pulla =

Species of robberfly

Clephydroneura pulla is a species of robberfly in the family Asilidae. It is found in Andhra Pradesh.

This species is differentiated from the similar Clephydoneura semirufa most notably by its completely dark legs. The tibia are browner and lighter towards the base. The central stripe of the thorax is divided into two parts, which are well separated by a yellow area.
