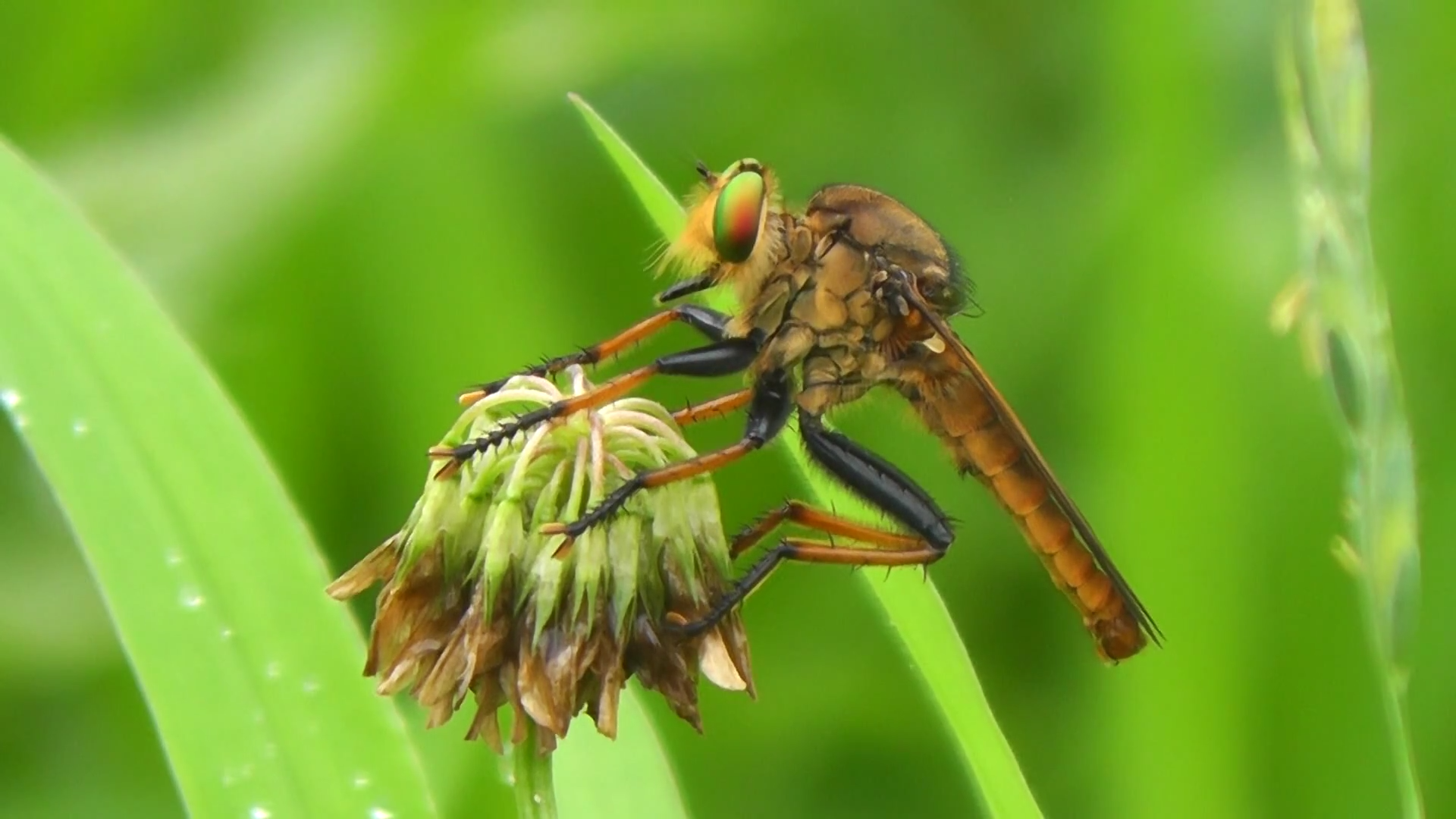
- In Japan

Scientific classification
- Kingdom: Animalia
- Phylum: Arthropoda
- Class: Insecta
- Order: Diptera
- Family: Asilidae
- Genus: Cophinopoda
- Species: C. chinensis

Binomial name
- Cophinopoda chinensis Fabricius, 1794

= Cophinopoda chinensis =

Species of fly

Cophinopoda chinensis is a species of robber fly in the family Asilidae. No subspecies are currently listed in the Catalogue of Life.

== Distribution ==
Cophinopoda chinensis is distributed across East and South Asia, including Japan, South Korea, China, India (including the Andaman and Nicobar Islands), Sri Lanka, and parts of Indonesia such as Java and Sumatra. In Japanese, it is known as 'aome-abu' (アオメアブ), literally meaning "blue-eyed horsefly", although the species is a robber fly (family Asilidae).

== Description ==
Adults typically measure 20–29 mm in length. The compound eyes are iridescent green.

== Behaviour ==
Like other robber flies, C. chinensis is predatory and feeds on other insects, which it captures in flight.

== Taxonomy ==
The species was first described by Johan Christian Fabricius in 1794.

== Gallery ==
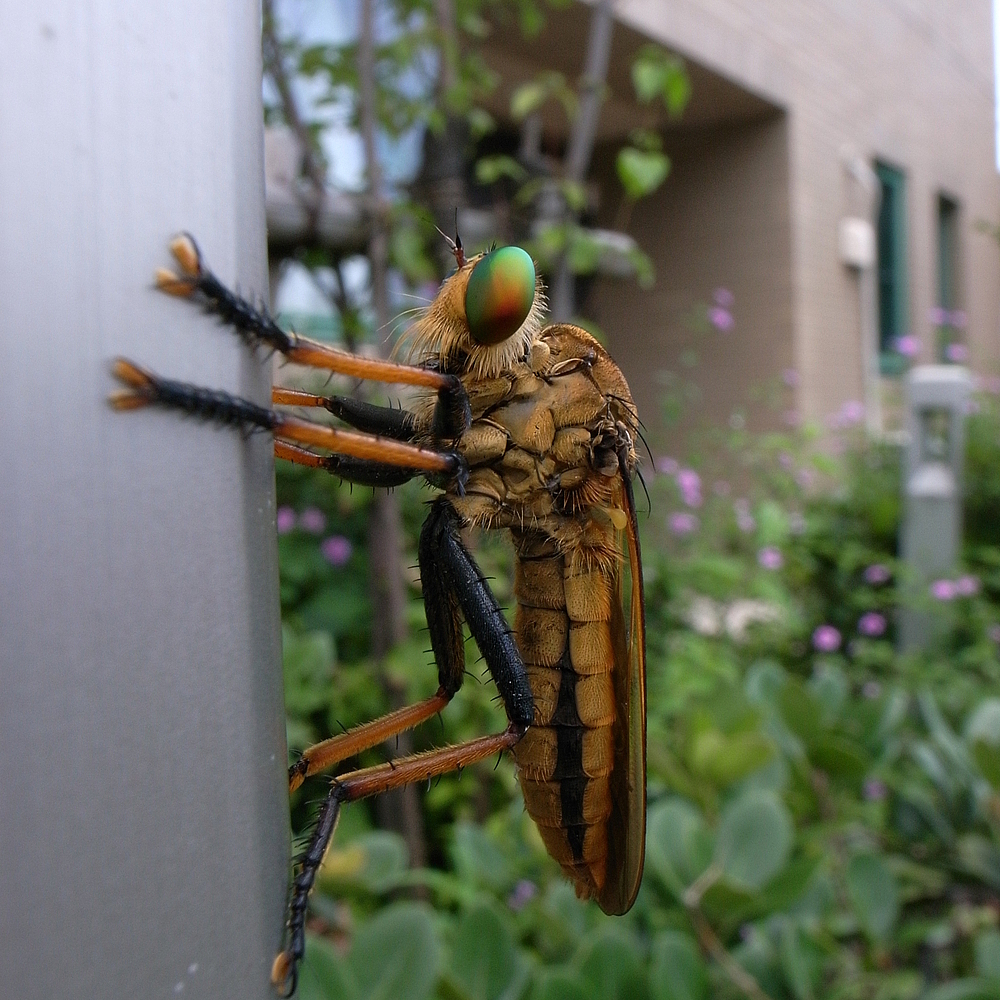

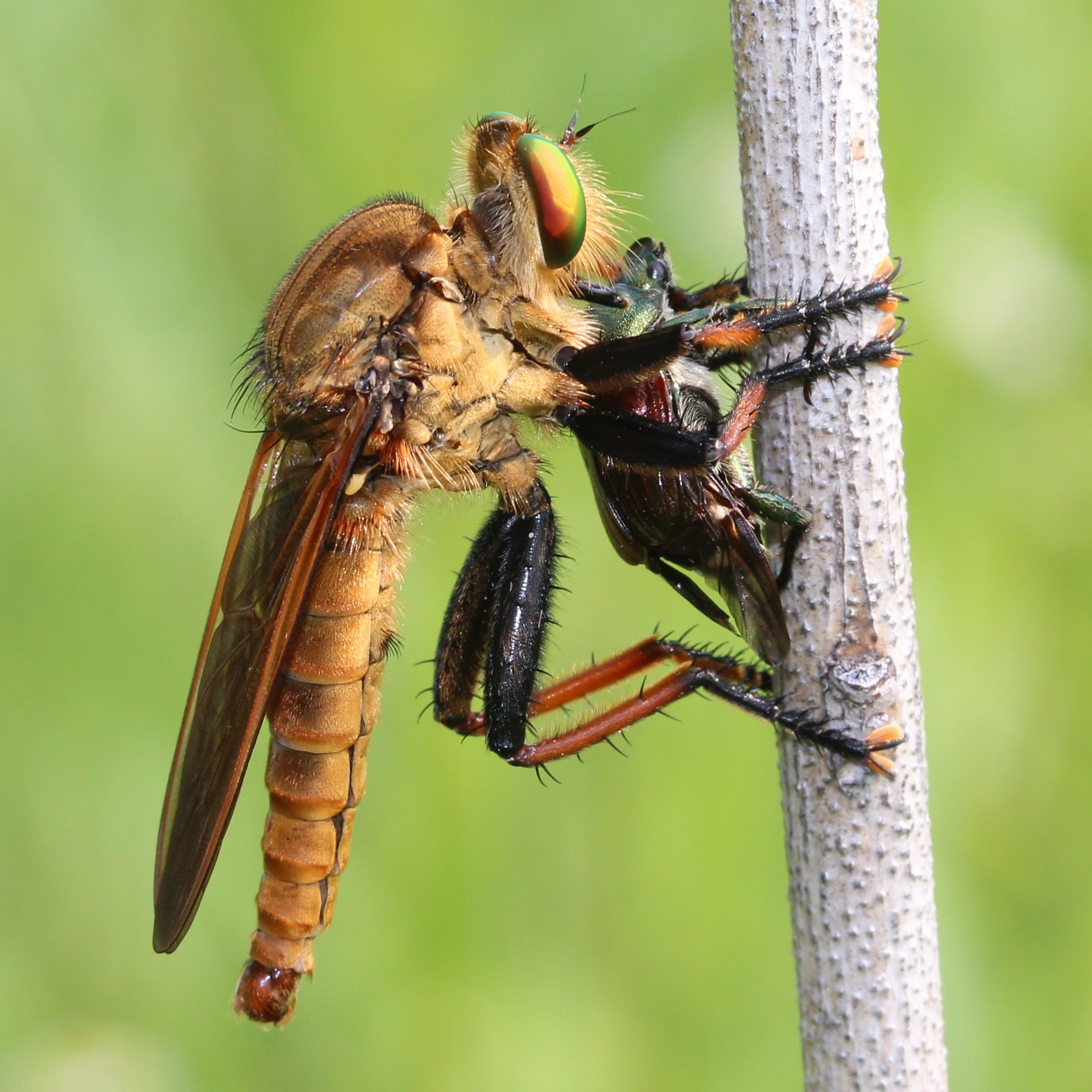
