= Cyrtopogon laphriformis =

Scientific classification
- Domain: Eukaryota
- Kingdom: Animalia
- Phylum: Arthropoda
- Class: Insecta
- Order: Diptera
- Family: Asilidae
- Genus: Cyrtopogon
- Species: C. laphriformis

Binomial name
- Cyrtopogon laphriformis Curran, 1923

Species of fly

Cyrtopogon laphriformis is a species of robber flies in the family Asilidae.
