= Cophura apotma =

Scientific classification
- Domain: Eukaryota
- Kingdom: Animalia
- Phylum: Arthropoda
- Class: Insecta
- Order: Diptera
- Family: Asilidae
- Genus: Cophura
- Species: C. apotma

Binomial name
- Cophura apotma Pritchard, 1943

Species of fly

Cophura apotma is a species of insect in the family Asilidae, commonly known as robber flies. It was described by Pritchard in 1943. The genus Cophura is known for its predatory behavior, which involves capturing other insects while they are flying.
