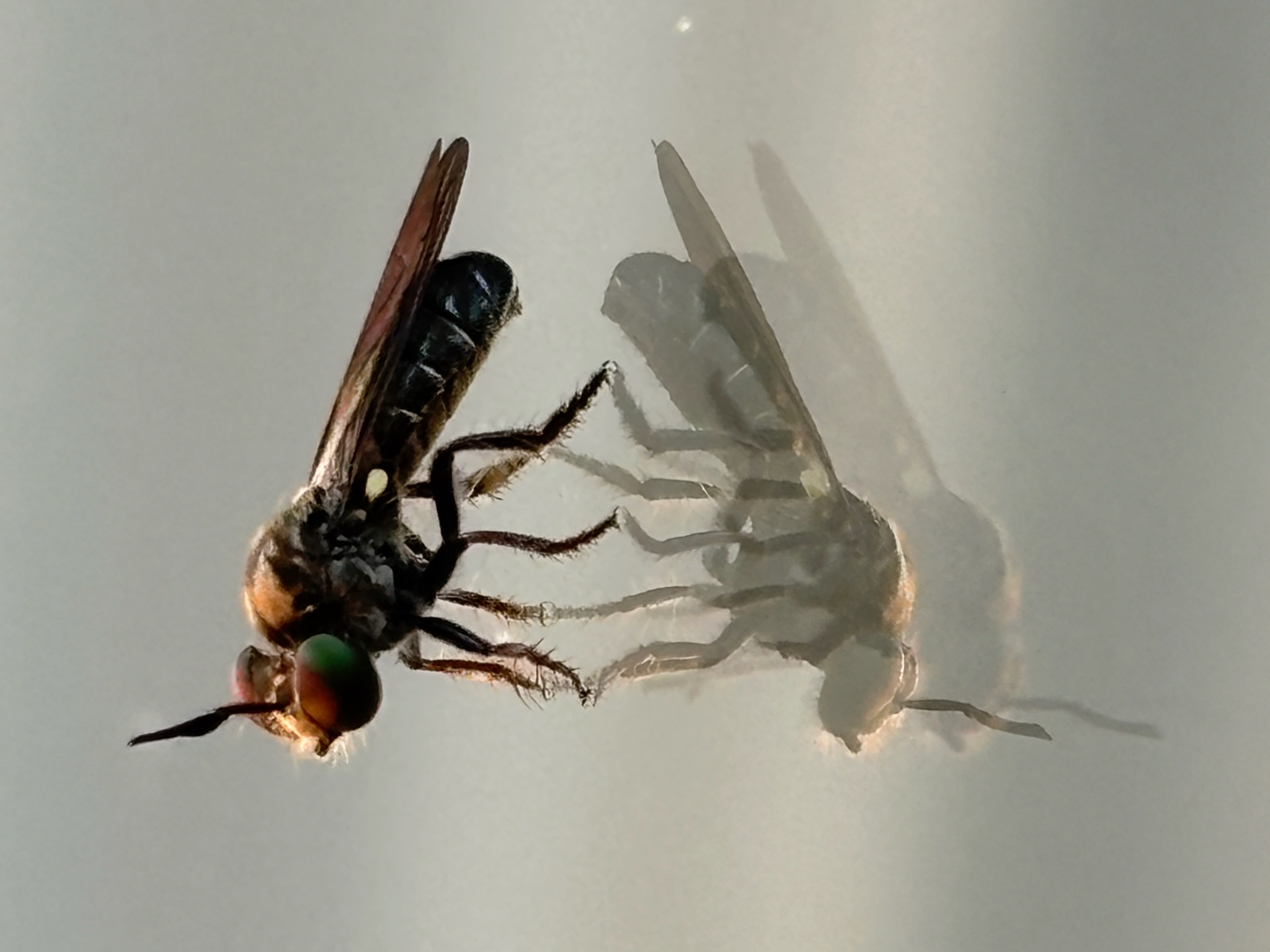

Scientific classification
- Kingdom: Animalia
- Phylum: Arthropoda
- Clade: Pancrustacea
- Class: Insecta
- Order: Diptera
- Family: Asilidae
- Genus: Cerotainia
- Species: C. macrocera

Binomial name
- Cerotainia macrocera (Say, 1823)

Synonyms
- Laphria macrocera Say, 1823

= Cerotainia macrocera =

Species of fly

Cerotainia macrocera is a species of robber flies in the family Asilidae.
