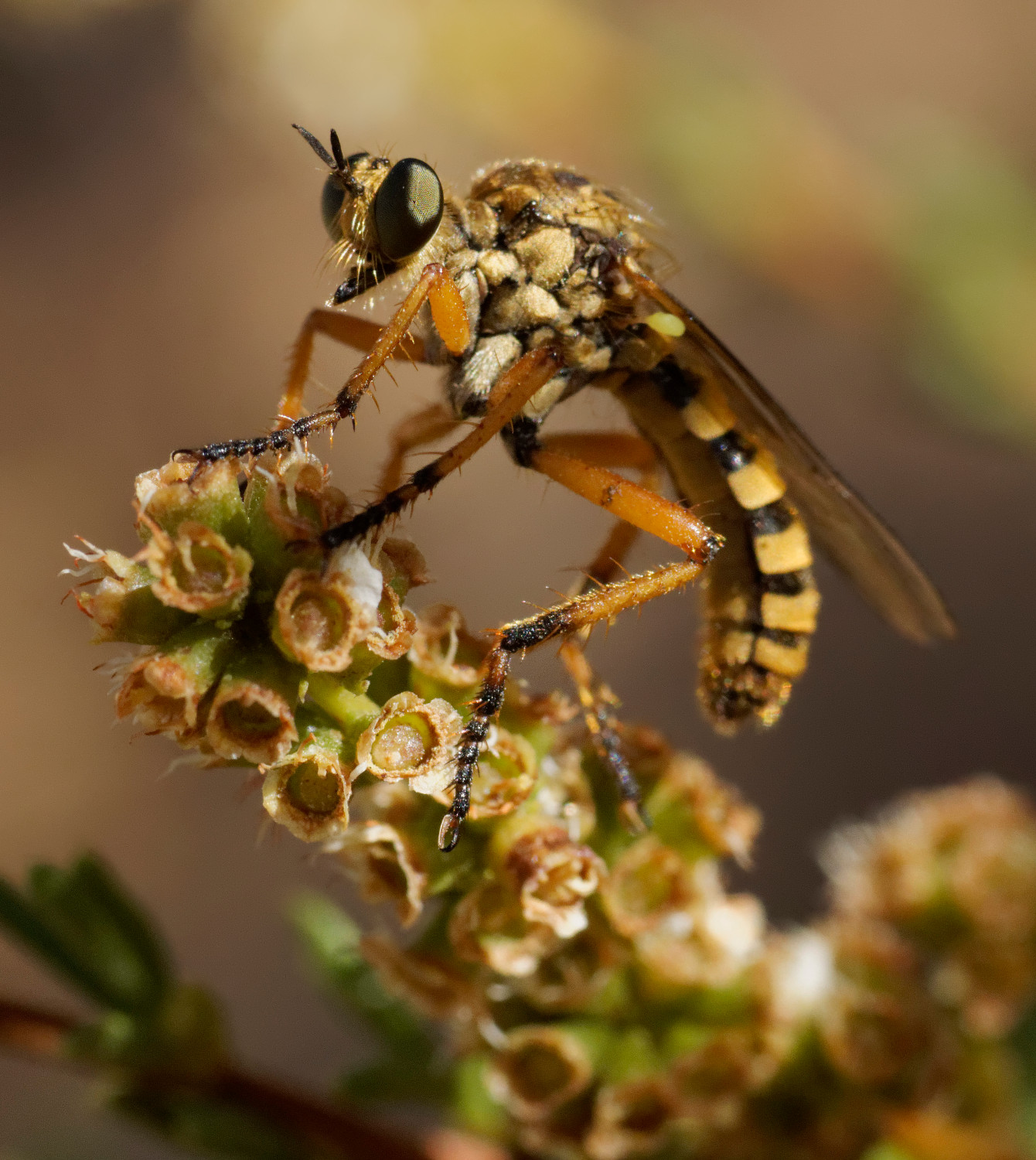
- Callinicus pictitarsis

Scientific classification
- Domain: Eukaryota
- Kingdom: Animalia
- Phylum: Arthropoda
- Class: Insecta
- Order: Diptera
- Family: Asilidae
- Subfamily: Stenopogoninae
- Genus: Callinicus; Loew, 1872

= Callinicus (fly) =

Genus of flies

Callinicus is a genus of robber flies in the family Asilidae. There are about five described species in Callinicus.

== Species ==
These five species belong to the genus Callinicus:

- Callinicus calcaneus Loew, 1872^{i c g b}
- Callinicus pictitarsis (Bigot, 1878)^{i c g b}
- Callinicus pollenius (Cole, 1919)^{i c g b}
- Callinicus quadrinotatus (Bigot, 1878)^{i c g}
- Callinicus vittatus Wilcox, 1936^{i c g}

Data sources: i = ITIS, c = Catalogue of Life, g = GBIF, b = Bugguide.net
