= Cyrtopogon lyratus =

Scientific classification
- Domain: Eukaryota
- Kingdom: Animalia
- Phylum: Arthropoda
- Class: Insecta
- Order: Diptera
- Family: Asilidae
- Genus: Cyrtopogon
- Species: C. lyratus

Binomial name
- Cyrtopogon lyratus Osten Sacken, 1878

Species of fly

Cyrtopogon lyratus is a species of robber flies in the family Asilidae.
