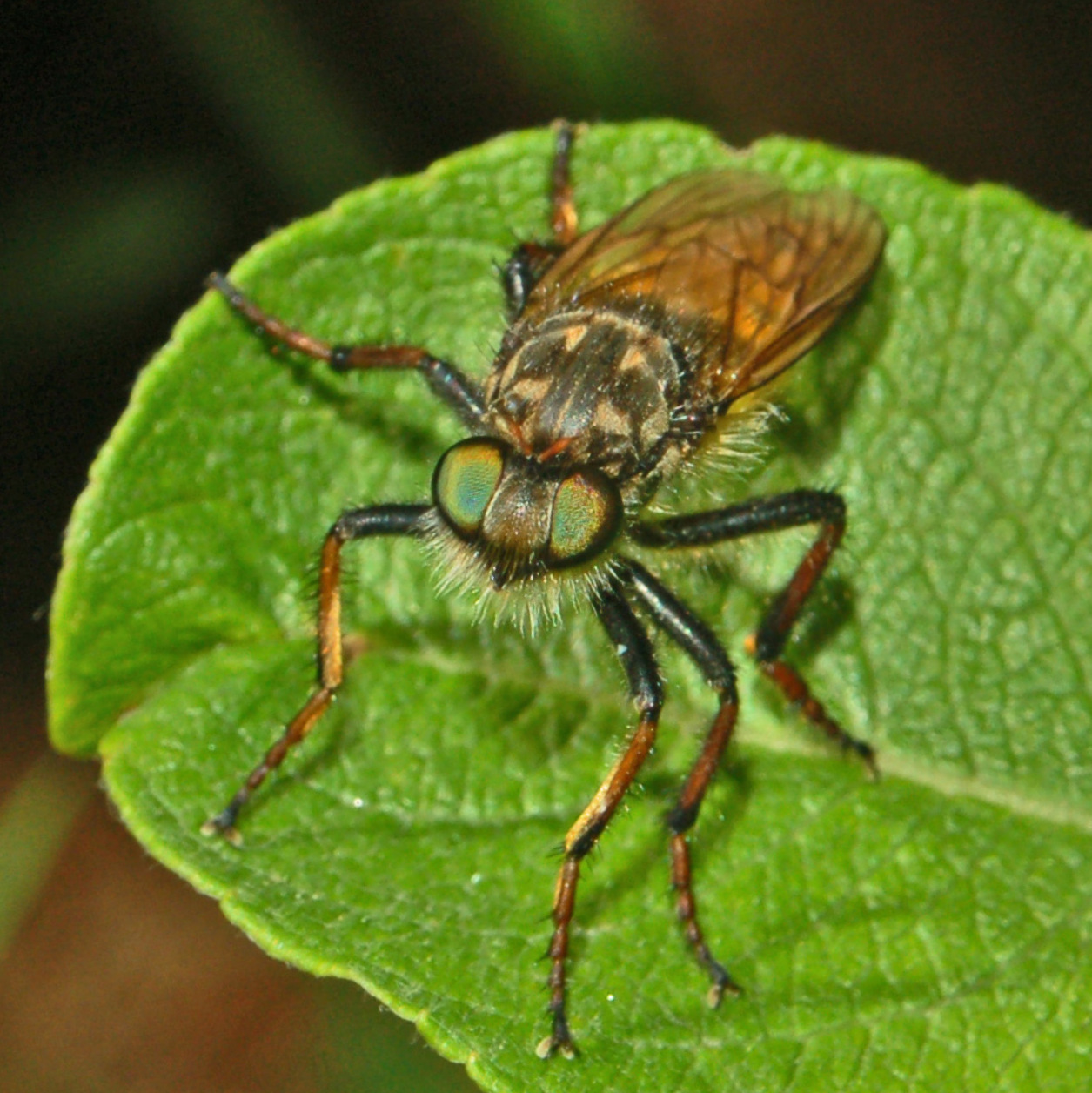
- Front view

Scientific classification
- Kingdom: Animalia
- Phylum: Arthropoda
- Class: Insecta
- Order: Diptera
- Family: Asilidae
- Genus: Cyrtopogon
- Species: C. ruficornis

Binomial name
- Cyrtopogon ruficornis (Fabricius, 1794)

Synonyms
- Asilus ruficornis Fabricius, 1794

= Cyrtopogon ruficornis =

Species of fly

Cyrtopogon ruficornis is a species of fly in the robber flies family. It is found in parts of Central and Southern Europe.

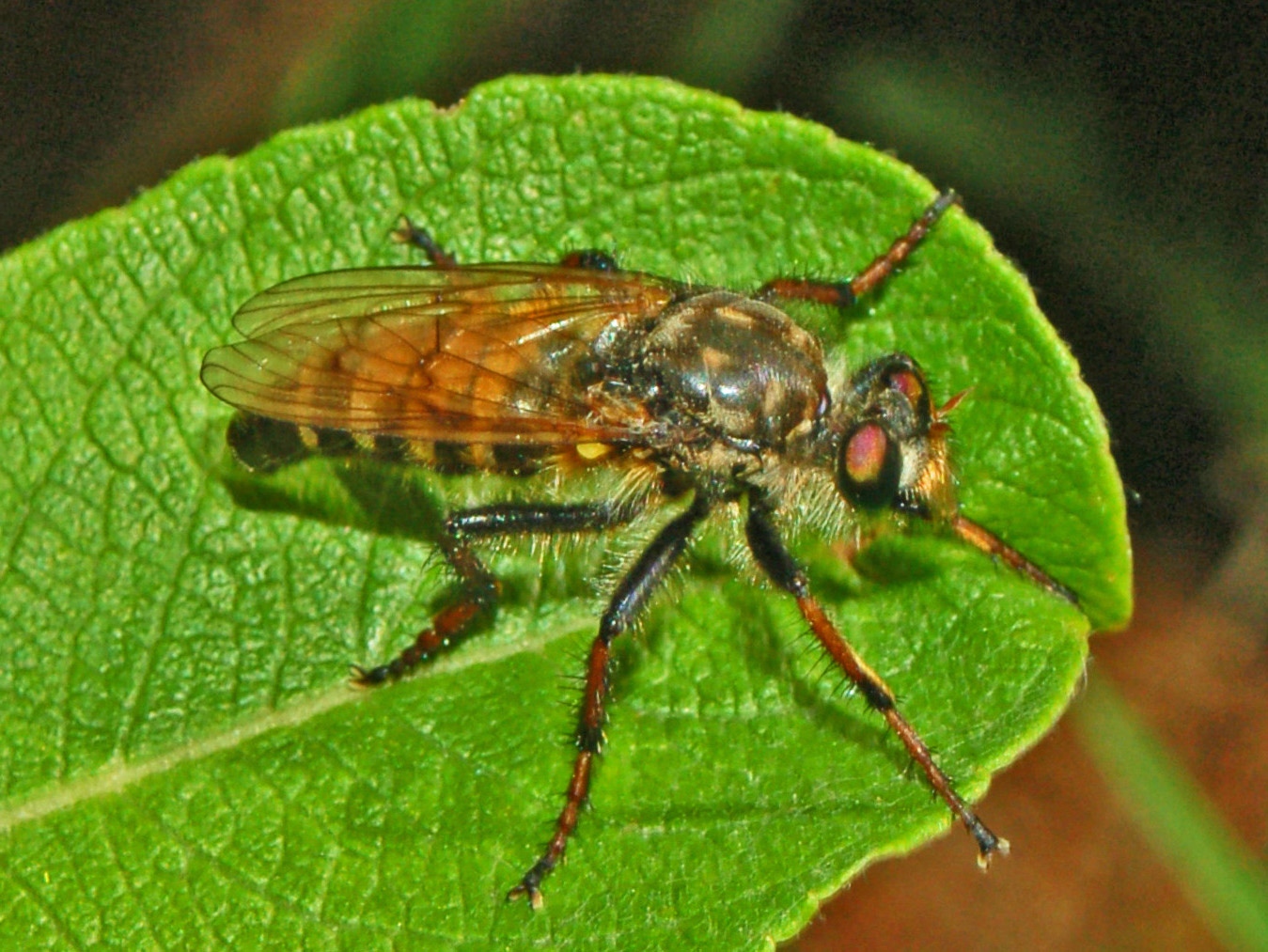
Female, dorsal view

== Distribution ==
This species occurs in Austria, Bulgaria, Croatia, Czech Republic, France, Germany, Italy, Poland, Romania, Slovakia, Switzerland, and former Yugoslavia.

== Description ==
Cyrtopogon ruficornis can reach a body length of about 12–20 mm (0.47–0.79 in). In the antennae of these robber flies the postpedicels are red. Tergites 2-4 are nearly completely covered with densely arranged yellow hairs. Tibiae are at least in part red. In males tarsi of front legs are distinctly elongated.

In the male's genitalia epandrium is partially divided, apically rounded, sclerotized and covered with long hairs, while hypandrium shows at the apex two projections. Also the flattened dististylus is apically pointed. Aedeagus is tubular with two straight, pointed projections. In the female's genitalia the ovipositor is sclerotized, with six acanthophorites on each side.

== Biology ==
Adults can be found from April to August. This species has a complex courtship. Usually the males dance in front of the females showing the shining black tip of the abdomen and raising his body on middle and hind legs. As other robber flies, they are predators on other insects.
