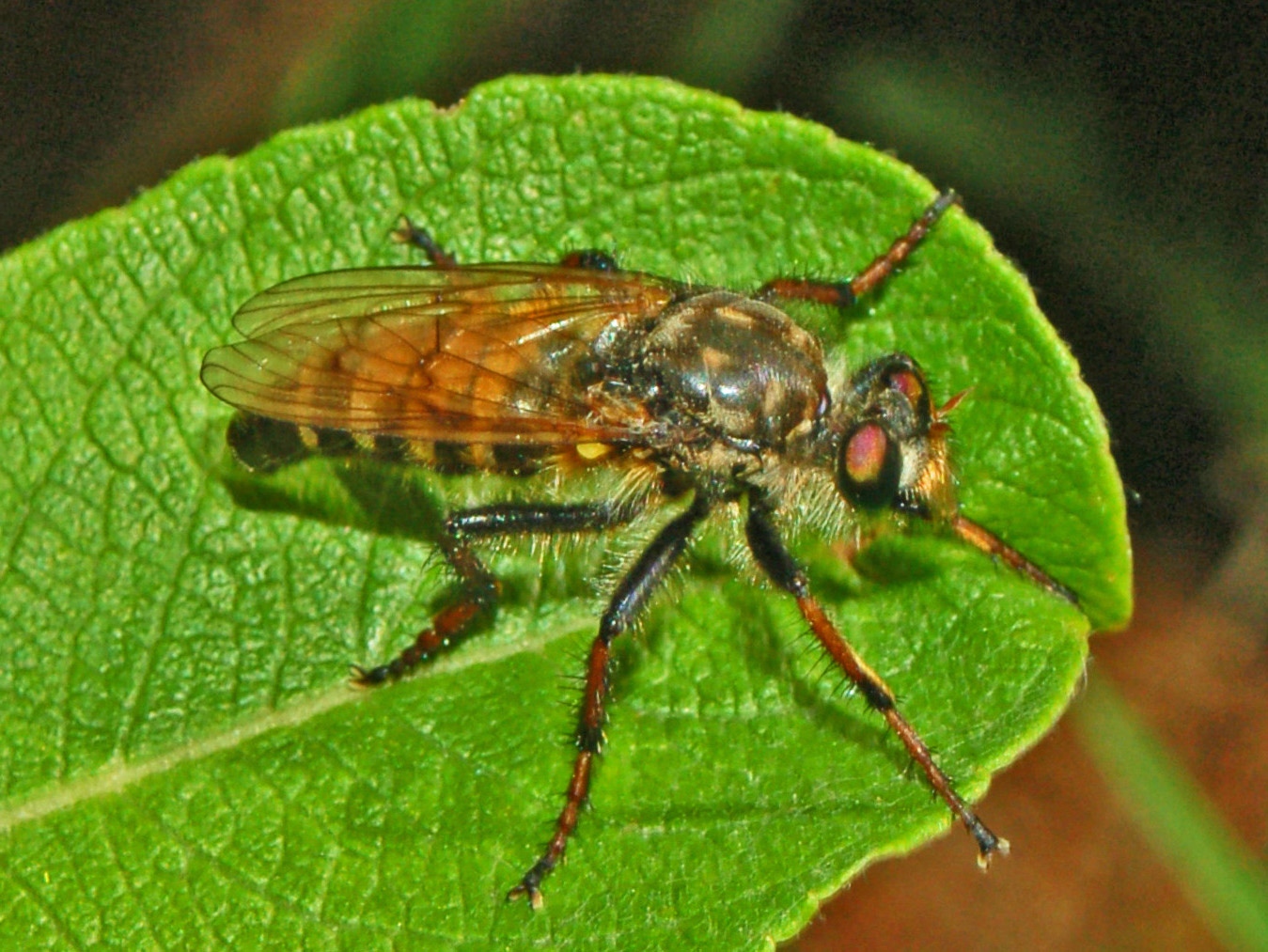
- Cyrtopogon ruficornis

Scientific classification
- Domain: Eukaryota
- Kingdom: Animalia
- Phylum: Arthropoda
- Class: Insecta
- Order: Diptera
- Family: Asilidae
- Tribe: Stenopogonini
- Genus: Cyrtopogon

= Cyrtopogon (fly) =

Genus of flies

Cyrtopogon is a genus of robber flies in the family Asilidae. There are at least 120 described species in Cyrtopogon.

== See also ==
- List of Cyrtopogon species
