= List of Asilidae species =

Robber flies species

This article lists the described fly species of the family Asilidae. There are about 7100 described species worldwide in this family.

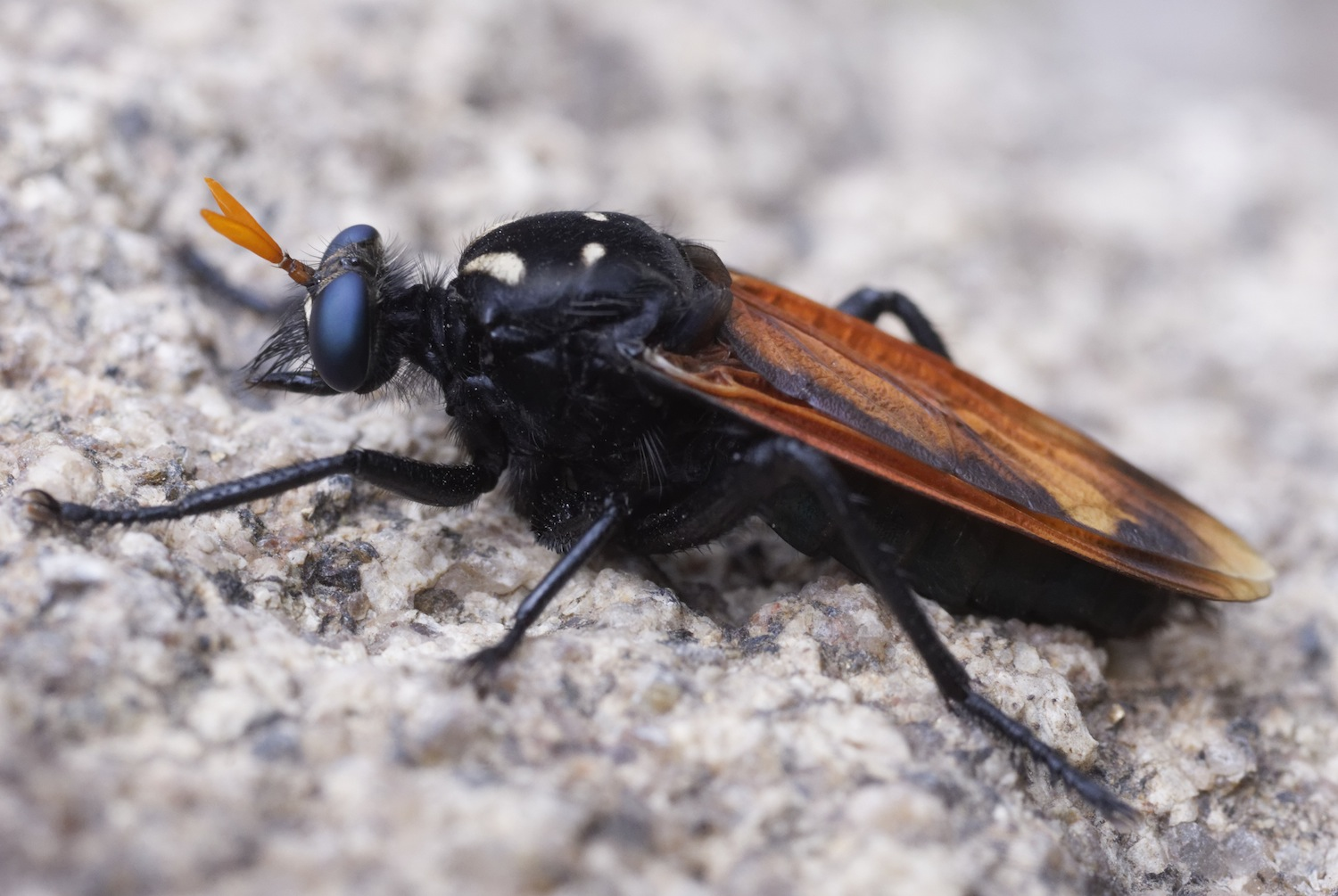
Female adult of Prolepsis lucifer photographed in Reserva Natural Parque San Martin, Cordoba, Argentina

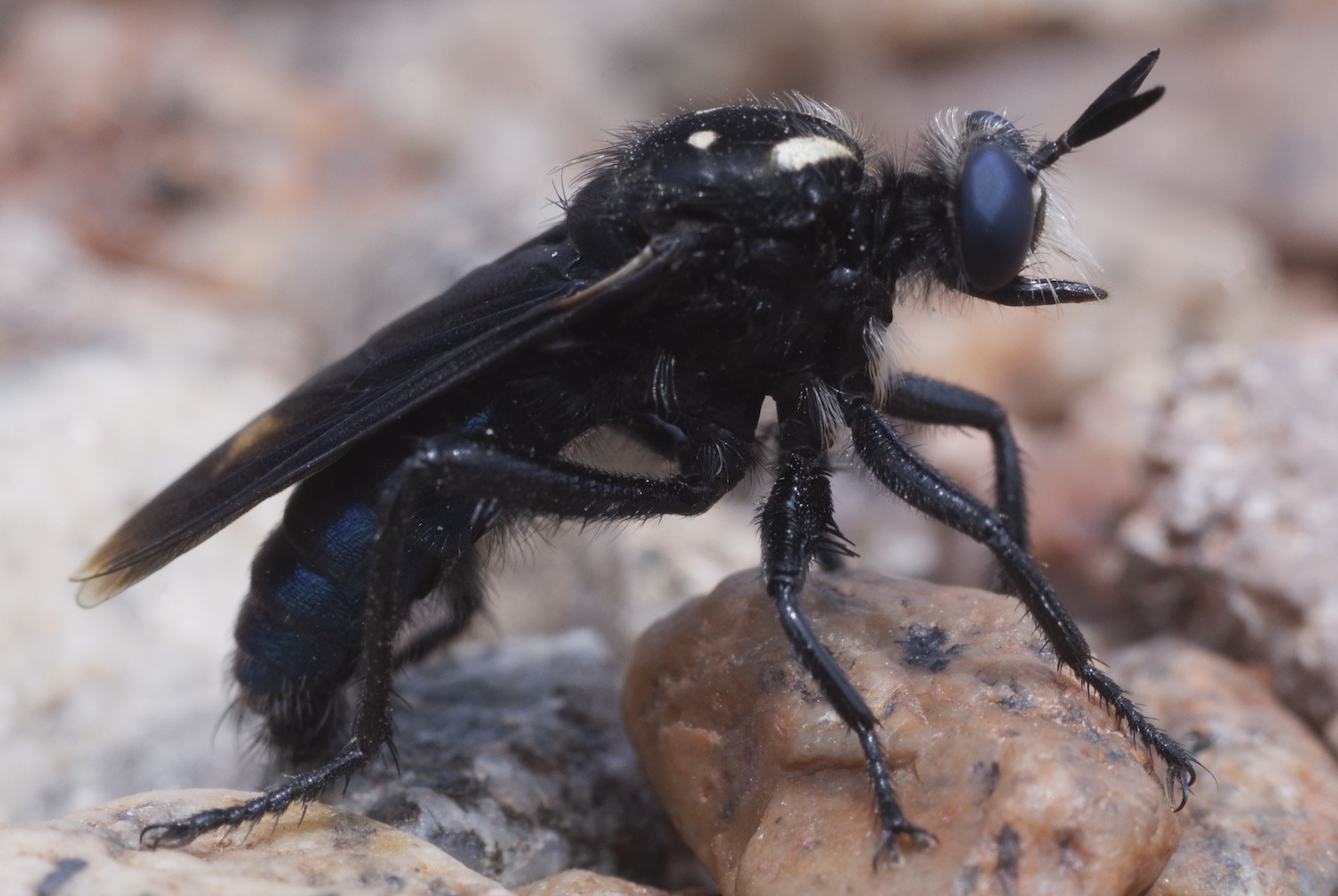
Male adult of Prolepsis lucifer photographed in Reserva Natural Parque San Martin, Cordoba, Argentina

A • B • C • D • E • F • G • H • I • J • K • L • M • N • O • P • Q • R • S • T • U • V • W • Y • Z
