= List of Asilidae species: N =

This article lists described species of the family Asilidae start with letter N.

A • B • C • D • E • F • G • H • I • J • K • L • M • N • O • P • Q • R • S • T • U • V • W • Y • Z

== List of species ==
=== Genus Nannocyrtopogon ===
- Nannocyrtopogon antennatus (Wilcox & Martin, 1957)
- Nannocyrtopogon aristatus (James, 1942)
- Nannocyrtopogon arnaudi (Wilcox & Martin, 1957)
- Nannocyrtopogon atripes (Wilcox & Martin, 1936)
- Nannocyrtopogon bruneri (Wilcox & Martin, 1957)
- Nannocyrtopogon cerussatus (Osten-Sacken, 1877)
- Nannocyrtopogon crumbi (Wilcox & Martin, 1957)
- Nannocyrtopogon deserti (Wilcox & Martin, 1957)
- Nannocyrtopogon howlandi (Wilcox & Martin, 1957)
- Nannocyrtopogon inyoi (Wilcox & Martin, 1957)
- Nannocyrtopogon irwini (Wilcox & Martin, 1957)
- Nannocyrtopogon jbeameri (Wilcox & Martin, 1957)
- Nannocyrtopogon lestomyiformis (Wilcox & Martin, 1936)
- Nannocyrtopogon mingusi (Wilcox & Martin, 1957)
- Nannocyrtopogon minutus (Wilcox & Martin, 1936)
- Nannocyrtopogon monrovia (Wilcox & Martin, 1936)
- Nannocyrtopogon neoculatus (Wilcox & Martin, 1957)
- Nannocyrtopogon nevadensis (Wilcox & Martin, 1957)
- Nannocyrtopogon nigricolor (Coquillett, 1904)
- Nannocyrtopogon nitidus (Wilcox & Martin, 1957)
- Nannocyrtopogon oculatus (Wilcox & Martin, 1936)
- Nannocyrtopogon richardsoni (Wilcox & Martin, 1957)
- Nannocyrtopogon sequoia (Wilcox & Martin, 1957)
- Nannocyrtopogon stonei (Wilcox & Martin, 1957)
- Nannocyrtopogon timberlakei (Wilcox & Martin, 1957)
- Nannocyrtopogon tolandi (Wilcox & Martin, 1957)
- Nannocyrtopogon vanduzeei (Wilcox & Martin, 1936)
- Nannocyrtopogon vandykei (Wilcox & Martin, 1957)

=== Genus Nannodioctria ===
- Nannodioctria lopatini (Lehr, 1965)
- Nannodioctria seminole (Bromley, 1924)

=== Genus Negasilus ===
- Negasilus belli (Curran, 1934)
- Negasilus gramalis (Adisoemarto, 1967)

=== Genus Neocyrtopogon ===
- Neocyrtopogon bifasciatus (Ricardo, 1912)

=== Genus Neodioctria ===
- Neodioctria australis (Ricardo, 1918)

=== Genus Neodiogmites ===
- Neodiogmites alexanderi (Carrera, 1949)
- Neodiogmites atriapex (Carrera & Papavero, 1962)
- Neodiogmites carrerai (Artigas & Papavero, 1988)
- Neodiogmites hirtuosus (Wiedemann, 1821)
- Neodiogmites lanei (Carrera, 1949)
- Neodiogmites tauauna (Artigas & Papavero, 1988)
- Neodiogmites tenebrosus (Carrera, 1949)

=== Genus Neoepitriptus ===
- Neoepitriptus minusculus (Bezzi, 1898)
- Neoepitriptus ninae (Lehr, 1992)

=== Genus Neoholopogon ===
- Neoholopogon loewi (Joseph & Parui, 1989)

=== Genus Neoitamus ===
- Neoitamus affinis (Williston, 1893)
- Neoitamus angusticornis (Loew, 1858)
- Neoitamus aurifer (Hermann, 1917)
- Neoitamus barsilensis (Joseph & Parui, 1984)
- Neoitamus belokobylskii (Lehr, 1999)
- Neoitamus bengalensis (Joseph & Parui, 1981)
- Neoitamus brevicomus (Hine, 1909)
- Neoitamus calcuttaensis (Joseph & Parui, 1986)
- Neoitamus castaneipennis (Tagawa, 1981)
- Neoitamus castellanii (Hradský, 1956)
- Neoitamus coquillettii (Hine, 1909)
- Neoitamus cyaneocinctus (Pandellé, 1905)
- Neoitamus dhenkundensis (Joseph & Parui, 1987)
- Neoitamus dolichurus (Becker, 1925)
- Neoitamus fertilis (Becker, 1925)
- Neoitamus grahami (Joseph & Parui, 1986)
- Neoitamus hardyi (Bromley, 1938)
- Neoitamus himalayensis (Joseph & Parui, 1984)
- Neoitamus hyalipennis (Ricardo, 1913)
- Neoitamus impudicus (Gerstaecker, 1862)
- Neoitamus ishiharai (Tagawa, 1981)
- Neoitamus javanensis (Meijere, 1913)
- Neoitamus khasiensis (Bromley, 1935)
- Neoitamus lascus (Walker, 1849)
- Neoitamus leucopogon (Meijere, 1913)
- Neoitamus maculatoides (Hardy, 1920)
- Neoitamus melanopogon (Schiner, 1868)
- Neoitamus meridionalis (Hutton, 1901)
- Neoitamus mussooriensis (Joseph & Parui, 1984)
- Neoitamus navasardiani (Richter, 1963)
- Neoitamus pediformis (Becker, 1925)
- Neoitamus planiceps (Schiner, 1868)
- Neoitamus potanini (Lehr, 1966)
- Neoitamus richterievi (Esipenko, 1972)
- Neoitamus rubripes (Hermann, 1917)
- Neoitamus rubrofemoratus (Ricardo, 1919)
- Neoitamus rudis (Walker, 1855)
- Neoitamus sedlaceki (Joseph & Parui, 1987)
- Neoitamus setifemur (Lehr, 1966)
- Neoitamus smithii (Hutton, 1901)
- Neoitamus socius (Loew, 1871)
- Neoitamus splendidus (Oldenberg, 1912)
- Neoitamus terminalis (Hine, 1909)
- Neoitamus tropicus (Ricardo, 1919)
- Neoitamus tumulus (Tomasovic, 1999)
- Neoitamus veris (Esipenko, 1974)

=== Genus Neolophonotus ===
- Neolophonotus acrolophus (Londt, 1988)
- Neolophonotus acrophilia (Londt, 1988)
- Neolophonotus acuminatus (Londt, 1985)
- Neolophonotus agrestis (Londt, 1985)
- Neolophonotus aktites (Londt, 1985)
- Neolophonotus albibarbis (Macquart, 1846)
- Neolophonotus albocuneatus (Hull, 1967)
- Neolophonotus albopilosus (Ricardo, 1920)
- Neolophonotus albovittatus (Schiner, 1867)
- Neolophonotus albus (Loew, 1858)
- Neolophonotus algidus (Londt, 1988)
- Neolophonotus amplus (Londt, 1985)
- Neolophonotus anatolicus (Londt, 1988)
- Neolophonotus anguicolis (Londt, 1985)
- Neolophonotus angustibarbus (Loew, 1858)
- Neolophonotus annae (Londt, 1988)
- Neolophonotus annettae (Londt, 1988)
- Neolophonotus anomalus (Londt, 1986)
- Neolophonotus antidasophrys (Londt, 1986)
- Neolophonotus arboreus (Londt, 1988)
- Neolophonotus argyphus (Londt, 1988)
- Neolophonotus atopus (Londt, 1986)
- Neolophonotus atrox (Londt, 1988)
- Neolophonotus attenuatus (Hull, 1967)
- Neolophonotus aureolocus (Londt, 1988)
- Neolophonotus ausensis (Londt, 1985)
- Neolophonotus avus (Londt, 1988)
- Neolophonotus baeoura (Londt, 1988)
- Neolophonotus bamptoni (Londt, 1987)
- Neolophonotus bezzi (Londt, 1986)
- Neolophonotus bicuspis (Londt, 1985)
- Neolophonotus bigoti (Londt, 1988)
- Neolophonotus bimaculatus (Londt, 1986)
- Neolophonotus boa (Londt, 1988)
- Neolophonotus botswana (Londt, 1988)
- Neolophonotus braunsi (Londt, 1986)
- Neolophonotus brendani (Londt, 1988)
- Neolophonotus breonii (Macquart, 1838)
- Neolophonotus brevicauda (Londt, 1985)
- Neolophonotus bromleyi (Londt, 1987)
- Neolophonotus brunales (Londt, 1988)
- Neolophonotus carnifex (Londt, 1988)
- Neolophonotus carorum (Londt, 1986)
- Neolophonotus chaineyi (Londt, 1986)
- Neolophonotus chionthrix (Hull, 1967)
- Neolophonotus chrysopylus (Londt, 1988)
- Neolophonotus chubbii (Bromley, 1947)
- Neolophonotus circus (Londt, 1988)
- Neolophonotus clavulus (Londt, 1988)
- Neolophonotus coetzeei (Londt, 1985)
- Neolophonotus colubris (Londt, 1988)
- Neolophonotus congoensis (Ricardo, 1920)
- Neolophonotus coronatus (Londt, 1987)
- Neolophonotus costatus (Londt, 1988)
- Neolophonotus crassicolis (Londt, 1985)
- Neolophonotus crassifemoralis (Londt, 1986)
- Neolophonotus crenulatus (Londt, 1985)
- Neolophonotus crinitus (Londt, 1986)
- Neolophonotus cristatus (Londt, 1988)
- Neolophonotus culinarius (Londt, 1985)
- Neolophonotus currani (Londt, 1988)
- Neolophonotus cuthbertsoni (Curran, 1934)
- Neolophonotus cymbius (Londt, 1988)
- Neolophonotus cynthiae (Londt, 1988)
- Neolophonotus declivicauda (Londt, 1988)
- Neolophonotus depilis (Londt, 1986)
- Neolophonotus destructor (Londt, 1988)
- Neolophonotus diana (Londt, 1988)
- Neolophonotus dichaetus (Hull, 1967)
- Neolophonotus dolabratus (Londt, 1988)
- Neolophonotus dondoensis (Londt, 1986)
- Neolophonotus dubius (Bezzi, 1892)
- Neolophonotus dysmicus (Londt, 1988)
- Neolophonotus elgon (Oldroyd, 1939)
- Neolophonotus ellenbergeri (Londt, 1988)
- Neolophonotus engeli (Londt, 1988)
- Neolophonotus ensiculus (Londt, 1987)
- Neolophonotus erythracanthus (Hermann, 1907)
- Neolophonotus expandocolis (Londt, 1985)
- Neolophonotus feijeni (Londt, 1988)
- Neolophonotus fimbriatus (Hull, 1967)
- Neolophonotus floccus (Londt, 1987)
- Neolophonotus forcipatus (Macquart, 1838)
- Neolophonotus fumosus (Londt, 1988)
- Neolophonotus gemsbock (Bromley, 1936)
- Neolophonotus genitalis (Ricardo, 1925)
- Neolophonotus gertrudae (Londt, 1985)
- Neolophonotus gilvipilosus (Londt, 1988)
- Neolophonotus gorongoza (Londt, 1988)
- Neolophonotus gravicauda (Londt, 1988)
- Neolophonotus grossus (Bromley, 1936)
- Neolophonotus haplotherates (Londt, 1987)
- Neolophonotus hara (Londt, 1986)
- Neolophonotus hessei (Londt, 1986)
- Neolophonotus hilaryae (Londt, 1988)
- Neolophonotus hirsutus (Ricardo, 1920)
- Neolophonotus hirtipes (Ricardo, 1920)
- Neolophonotus hobbyi (Londt, 1988)
- Neolophonotus holmi (Londt, 1988)
- Neolophonotus holoxanthus (Engel, 1927)
- Neolophonotus hulli (Londt, 1988)
- Neolophonotus hymenotelus (Londt, 1988)
- Neolophonotus indicus (Bromley, 1935)
- Neolophonotus io (Londt, 1986)
- Neolophonotus iota (Londt, 1988)
- Neolophonotus irwini (Londt, 1986)
- Neolophonotus isse (Walker, 1849)
- Neolophonotus jubatus (Londt, 1988)
- Neolophonotus junodi (Londt, 1985)
- Neolophonotus kalahari (Londt, 1985)
- Neolophonotus karooensis (Londt, 1987)
- Neolophonotus kerteszi (Londt, 1988)
- Neolophonotus kolochaetes (Londt, 1986)
- Neolophonotus ktenistus (Londt, 1986)
- Neolophonotus labeonis (Londt, 1988)
- Neolophonotus lacustrinus (Londt, 1988)
- Neolophonotus ladon (Walker, 1849)
- Neolophonotus lasius (Londt, 1988)
- Neolophonotus lawrencei (Londt, 1985)
- Neolophonotus leechi (Londt, 1988)
- Neolophonotus leptostylus (Londt, 1988)
- Neolophonotus leucodiadema (Londt, 1988)
- Neolophonotus leucopygus (Engel, 1927)
- Neolophonotus leucotaenia (Bezzi, 1906)
- Neolophonotus leucothrix (Londt, 1985)
- Neolophonotus lightfooti (Londt, 1986)
- Neolophonotus lindneri (Londt, 1988)
- Neolophonotus loewi (Londt, 1988)
- Neolophonotus loganius (Londt, 1988)
- Neolophonotus longicauda (Londt, 1988)
- Neolophonotus louisi (Londt, 1986)
- Neolophonotus macquarti (Londt, 1986)
- Neolophonotus macrocerus (Londt, 1985)
- Neolophonotus macromystax (Londt, 1986)
- Neolophonotus maculipennis (Lindner, 1955)
- Neolophonotus mafingaensisy (Londt, 1988)
- Neolophonotus malawi (Londt, 1988)
- Neolophonotus manselli (Londt, 1986)
- Neolophonotus margaracta (Londt, 1988)
- Neolophonotus marshalli (Hobby, 1934)
- Neolophonotus mediolocus (Londt, 1988)
- Neolophonotus megaphallus (Londt, 1987)
- Neolophonotus meiswinkeli (Londt, 1988)
- Neolophonotus melanoura (Londt, 1988)
- Neolophonotus melinus (Londt, 1987)
- Neolophonotus membrana (Londt, 1987)
- Neolophonotus membraneus (Londt, 1988)
- Neolophonotus mesotopus (Londt, 1988)
- Neolophonotus midas (Londt, 1988)
- Neolophonotus milleri (Londt, 1985)
- Neolophonotus milvus (Londt, 1988)
- Neolophonotus minutus (Hull, 1967)
- Neolophonotus molestus (Londt, 1988)
- Neolophonotus montanus (Ricardo, 1920)
- Neolophonotus munroi (Londt, 1987)
- Neolophonotus namaqua (Londt, 1985)
- Neolophonotus namibiensis (Londt, 1985)
- Neolophonotus nanus (Bezzi, 1906)
- Neolophonotus natalensis (Ricardo, 1920)
- Neolophonotus necator (Londt, 1988)
- Neolophonotus nero (Londt, 1988)
- Neolophonotus nigripes (Ricardo, 1920)
- Neolophonotus nigriseta (Londt, 1985)
- Neolophonotus nisus (Londt, 1988)
- Neolophonotus niveus (Londt, 1987)
- Neolophonotus nodus (Londt, 1988)
- Neolophonotus notius (Londt, 1988)
- Neolophonotus obtectocolis (Londt, 1985)
- Neolophonotus occesilitus (Londt, 1987)
- Neolophonotus occidualis (Londt, 1988)
- Neolophonotus ochrochaetus (Hull, 1967)
- Neolophonotus oldroydi (Londt, 1988)
- Neolophonotus orientalis (Ricardo, 1920)
- Neolophonotus pachystylus (Londt, 1988)
- Neolophonotus penrithae (Londt, 1988)
- Neolophonotus percus (Londt, 1988)
- Neolophonotus pilosus (Londt, 1986)
- Neolophonotus pinheyi (Londt, 1986)
- Neolophonotus pollex (Londt, 1987)
- Neolophonotus porcellus (Speiser, 1910)
- Neolophonotus pusillus (Londt, 1988)
- Neolophonotus quickelbergei (Londt, 1988)
- Neolophonotus ramus (Londt, 1988)
- Neolophonotus raptor (Londt, 1988)
- Neolophonotus raymondi (Londt, 1987)
- Neolophonotus rhodesii (Ricardo, 1920)
- Neolophonotus rhopalotus (Londt, 1988)
- Neolophonotus roberti (Londt, 1990)
- Neolophonotus robertsoni (Londt, 1985)
- Neolophonotus rolandi (Londt, 1985)
- Neolophonotus rossi (Londt, 1986)
- Neolophonotus rudi (Londt, 1988)
- Neolophonotus rufus (Macquart, 1838)
- Neolophonotus salina (Londt, 1987)
- Neolophonotus sanchorus (Londt, 1987)
- Neolophonotus satanus (Londt, 1987)
- Neolophonotus saxatilus (Londt, 1988)
- Neolophonotus schalki (Londt, 1985)
- Neolophonotus schoemani (Londt, 1985)
- Neolophonotus schofieldi (Londt, 1988)
- Neolophonotus setiventris (Loew, 1858)
- Neolophonotus seymourae (Londt, 1986)
- Neolophonotus sicarius (Londt, 1988)
- Neolophonotus similis (Ricardo, 1920)
- Neolophonotus sinis (Londt, 1988)
- Neolophonotus sinuvena (Londt, 1987)
- Neolophonotus somali (Londt, 1990)
- Neolophonotus soutpanensis (Londt, 1986)
- Neolophonotus spinicaudata (Londt, 1985)
- Neolophonotus spinosus (Londt, 1988)
- Neolophonotus spoliator (Londt, 1987)
- Neolophonotus squamosus (Londt, 1985)
- Neolophonotus stevensoni (Londt, 1985)
- Neolophonotus struthaulon (Londt, 1987)
- Neolophonotus stuckenbergi (Londt, 1986)
- Neolophonotus swaensis (Londt, 1985)
- Neolophonotus tanymedus (Londt, 1986)
- Neolophonotus theroni (Londt, 1985)
- Neolophonotus tibialis (Macquart, 1838)
- Neolophonotus torridus (Londt, 1985)
- Neolophonotus tribulosus (Londt, 1988)
- Neolophonotus trilobius (Londt, 1985)
- Neolophonotus truncatus (Londt, 1985)
- Neolophonotus umbrivena (Londt, 1987)
- Neolophonotus uncinus (Londt, 1988)
- Neolophonotus unicalamus (Londt, 1987)
- Neolophonotus vansoni (Bromley, 1936)
- Neolophonotus variabilis (Londt, 1986)
- Neolophonotus variegatus (Londt, 1988)
- Neolophonotus vermiculatus (Londt, 1988)
- Neolophonotus vincenti (Londt, 1988)
- Neolophonotus virescens (Engel, 1927)
- Neolophonotus walkeri (Londt, 1988)
- Neolophonotus wiedemanni (Londt, 1988)
- Neolophonotus wroughtoni (Ricardo, 1920)
- Neolophonotus xanthodasus (Londt, 1988)
- Neolophonotus xiphichaetus (Hull, 1967)
- Neolophonotus zambiensis (Londt, 1986)
- Neolophonotus zigzag (Londt, 1988)
- Neolophonotus zimbabwe (Londt, 1985)
- Neolophonotus zogreus (Londt, 1986)
- Neolophonotus zopherus (Londt, 1986)
- Neolophonotus zulu (Londt, 1985)

=== Genus Neomochtherus ===
- Neomochtherus alaicus (Lehr, 1996)
- Neomochtherus albicans (Loew, 1849)
- Neomochtherus auratus (Janssens, 1968)
- Neomochtherus candidus (Becker, 1923)
- Neomochtherus corcyraeus (Tsacas, 1965)
- Neomochtherus ganvus (Wulp, 1872)
- Neomochtherus genitalis (Parui & Kaur & Kapoor, 1994)
- Neomochtherus gomerae (Weinberg & Baez, 1989)
- Neomochtherus grandicollis (Becker, 1913)
- Neomochtherus himalayensis (Joseph & Parui, 1987)
- Neomochtherus hypopygialis (Schaeffer, 1916)
- Neomochtherus idahoae (Martin, 1975)
- Neomochtherus indianus (Ricardo, 1919)
- Neomochtherus lassenae (Martin, 1975)
- Neomochtherus leclerqi (Janssens, 1968)
- Neomochtherus nudus (Bezzi, 1906)
- Neomochtherus olivierii (Macquart, 1838)
- Neomochtherus olympiae (Martin, 1975)
- Neomochtherus oregonae (Martin, 1975)
- Neomochtherus patruelis (Wulp, 1872)
- Neomochtherus pubescens (Lehr, 1996)
- Neomochtherus rothkirchii (Speiser, 1913)
- Neomochtherus rutilans (Wulp, 1898)
- Neomochtherus siculus (Macquart, 1834)
- Neomochtherus striatus (Wulp, 1891)
- Neomochtherus yasya (Lehr, 1996)

=== Genus Neophoneus ===
- Neophoneus amandus (Walker, 1849)
- Neophoneus mustela (Hermann, 1912)
- Neophoneus servillei (Macquart, 1838)

=== Genus Neoscleropogon ===
- Neoscleropogon digentius (Walker, 1849)
- Neoscleropogon emerginatus (Hardy, 1928)
- Neoscleropogon flavifacies (Macquart, 1850)
- Neoscleropogon flavipennis (White, 1918)
- Neoscleropogon nicoteles (Walker, 1849)
- Neoscleropogon thalpius (Walker, 1849)

=== Genus Neotes ===
- Neotes chiloensis (Artigas, 1970)

=== Genus Nerax ===
- Nerax abdominalis (Wiedemann, 1821)
- Nerax affinis (Bellardi, 1861)
- Nerax amazonicus (Bromley, 1934)
- Nerax apicalis (Wiedemann, 1821)
- Nerax auribarbis (Wiedemann, 1821)
- Nerax aurimystaceus (Hine, 1919)
- Nerax badiapex (Bromley, 1928)
- Nerax bardyllis (Walker, 1849)
- Nerax beameri (Wilcox, 1966)
- Nerax belfragei (Hine, 1919)
- Nerax bilineatus (Wulp, 1882)
- Nerax brunnescens (Bromley, 1929)
- Nerax camposianus (Curran, 1931)
- Nerax cazieri (Curran, 1953)
- Nerax cockerellorum (James, 1953)
- Nerax cubensis (Bromley, 1929)
- Nerax eurylabis (Wiedemann, 1828)
- Nerax femoratus (Macquart, 1838)
- Nerax flavofasciatus (Wiedemann, 1828)
- Nerax forbesi (Curran, 1931)
- Nerax fulvibarbis (Macquart, 1848)
- Nerax fuscanipennis (Macquart, 1850)
- Nerax fuscus (Wiedemann, 1828)
- Nerax gossei (Farr, 1965)
- Nerax haloesus (Walker, 1849)
- Nerax hubbelli (James, 1953)
- Nerax imbuda (Curran, 1934)
- Nerax kansensis (Hine, 1919)
- Nerax lades (Walker, 1849)
- Nerax lascivus (Wiedemann, 1828)
- Nerax macrolabis (Wiedemann, 1828)
- Nerax medianus (Wiedemann, 1828)
- Nerax mexicanus (Hine, 1919)
- Nerax nigrinus (Wiedemann, 1821)
- Nerax nigripes (Macquart, 1850)
- Nerax nigritarsis (Hine, 1919)
- Nerax obscurus (Macquart, 1838)
- Nerax parvus (Walker, 1855)
- Nerax pictipennis (Schiner, 1868)
- Nerax pilosulus (Bromley, 1929)
- Nerax poecilolamprus (James, 1953)
- Nerax portoricensis (Hine, 1919)
- Nerax pyrrhogonus (Wiedemann, 1828)
- Nerax rufipes (Macquart, 1838)
- Nerax rufithorax (Macquart, 1846)
- Nerax rufitibia (Macquart, 1848)
- Nerax slossonae (Hine, 1919)
- Nerax stigmosus (Carrera & Andretta, 1950)
- Nerax subchalybeus (Bromley, 1928)
- Nerax tabescens (Banks, 1919)
- Nerax titan (Bromley, 1934)
- Nerax tortola (Curran, 1928)
- Nerax vauriei (Curran, 1953)
- Nerax velox (Wiedemann, 1828)

=== Genus Nerterhaptomenus ===
- Nerterhaptomenus morus (Hardy, 1934)

=== Genus Nicocles ===
- Nicocles abdominalis (Williston, 1883)
- Nicocles aemulator (Loew, 1872)
- Nicocles analis (Jaennicke, 1867)
- Nicocles argentatus (Coquillett, 1893)
- Nicocles bromleyi (Hardy, 1943)
- Nicocles canadensis (Curran, 1923)
- Nicocles dives (Loew, 1866)
- Nicocles engelhardti (Wilcox, 1946)
- Nicocles lomae (Cole, 1916)
- Nicocles pollinosus (Wilcox, 1946)
- Nicocles reinhardi (Bromley, 1934)
- Nicocles rufus (Williston, 1883)

=== Genus Nomomyia ===
- Nomomyia ivetteae (Artigas, 1970)

=== Genus Nothopogon ===
- Nothopogon triangularis (Artigas & Papavero & Pimentel, 1991)

=== Genus Notiolaphria ===
- Notiolaphria africana (Londt, 1977)
- Notiolaphria macra (Bigot, 1859)

=== Genus Notomochtherus ===
- Notomochtherus brevicauda (Londt, 2002)

=== Genus Nusa ===
- Nusa aequalis (Walker, 1851)
- Nusa albibasis (Ricardo, 1927)
- Nusa andhraensis (Joseph & Parui, 1999)
- Nusa balraji (Joseph & Parui, 1999)
- Nusa bengalensis (Joseph & Parui, 1987)
- Nusa bhargavai (Joseph & Parui, 1992)
- Nusa dispar (Gerstaecker, 1871)
- Nusa elva (Walker, 1849)
- Nusa eos (Londt, 2006)
- Nusa formio (Walker, 1851)
- Nusa geniculata (Joseph & Parui, 1997)
- Nusa ghorpadei (Joseph & Parui, 1987)
- Nusa grisea (Hermann, 1914)
- Nusa indica (Joseph & Parui, 1987)
- Nusa ingwavuma (Oldroyd, 1974)
- Nusa karikalensis (Joseph & Parui, 1989)
- Nusa mukherjeei (Joseph & Parui, 1997)
- Nusa pseudoalbibasis (Joseph & Parui, 1987)
- Nusa puella (Rondani, 1873)
- Nusa pursati (Tomosovic, 2005)
- Nusa rajasthanensis (Joseph & Parui, 1992)
- Nusa ramicosa (Loew, 1871)
- Nusa sahai (Joseph & Parui, 1997)
- Nusa setosa (Joseph & Parui, 1992)
- Nusa shevaroyensis (Joseph & Parui, 1992)
- Nusa sirkari (Joseph & Parui, 1997)
- Nusa smetsi (Tomosovic, 2005)
- Nusa trianguligera (Austen, 1914)
- Nusa vari (Tomosovic, 2005)
- Nusa yerburyi (Ricardo, 1927)

=== Genus Nyssomyia ===
- Nyssomyia ochracea (Hull, 1962)

=== Genus Nyximyia ===
- Nyximyia nigra (Hull, 1962)
