= List of Asilidae species: B =

This article lists described species of the family Asilidae start with letter B.

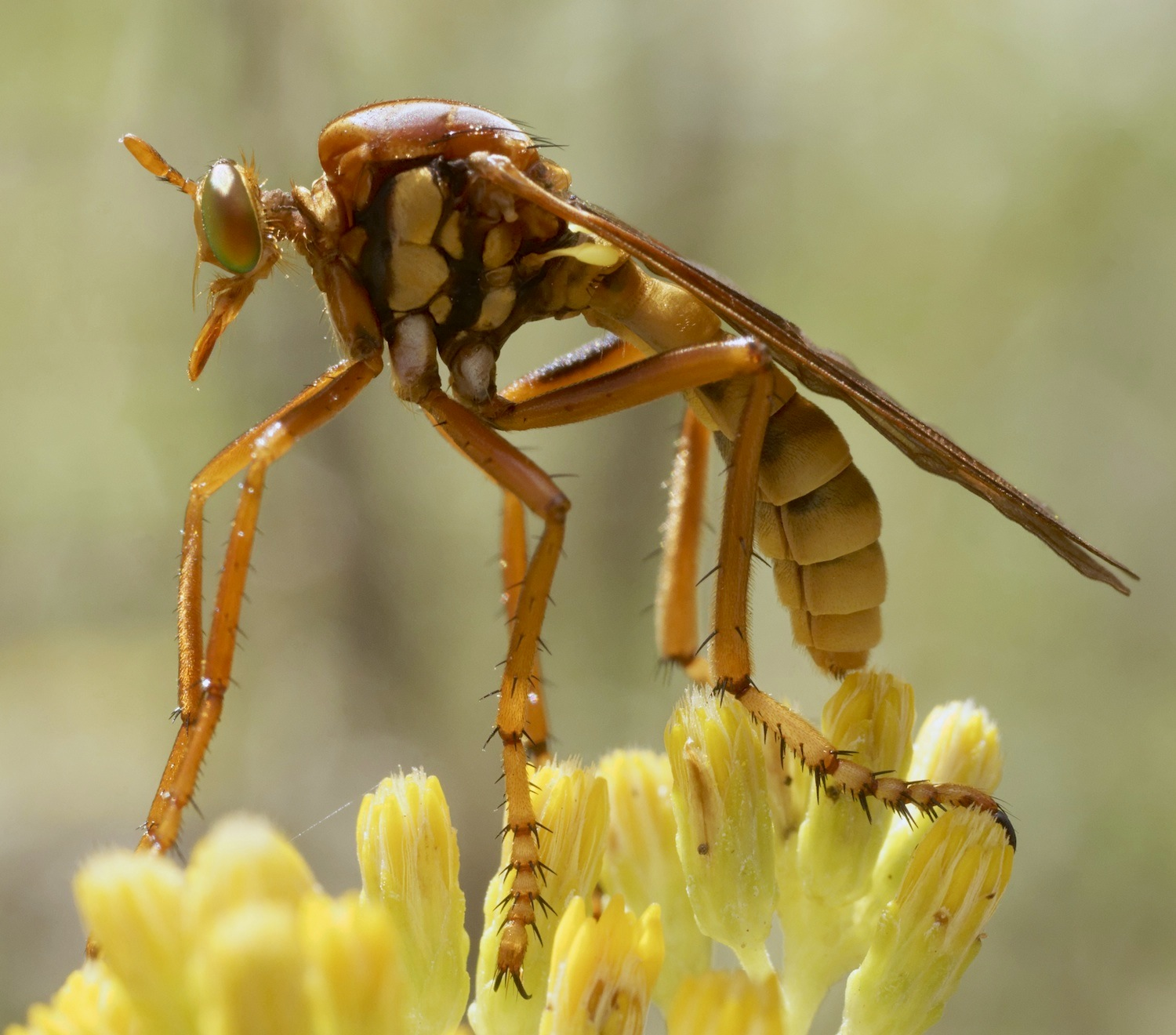
Blepharepium sonorensis, a robber fly that closely resembles Polistes paper wasp species such as P. apachus

A • B • C • D • E • F • G • H • I • J • K • L • M • N • O • P • Q • R • S • T • U • V • W • Y • Z

== List of species ==
=== Backomyia ===
- Backomyia anomala (Wilcox & Martin, 1957)
- Backomyia hannai (Wilcox & Martin, 1957)
- Backomyia limpidipennis (Wilcox, 1936)
- Backomyia schlingeri (Wilcox & Martin, 1957)
- Backomyia seminoensis (Lavigne, 1971)

=== Bamwardaria ===
- Bamwardaria josephi (Hradský, 1983)

=== Bana ===
- Bana apicida (Londt, 1992)

=== Bathropsis ===
- Bathropsis basalis (Curran, 1930)
- Bathropsis delgadoi (Kaletta, 1978)
- Bathropsis peruviana (Hermann, 1912)
- Bathropsis plazai (Kaletta, 1986)

=== Bathypogon ===
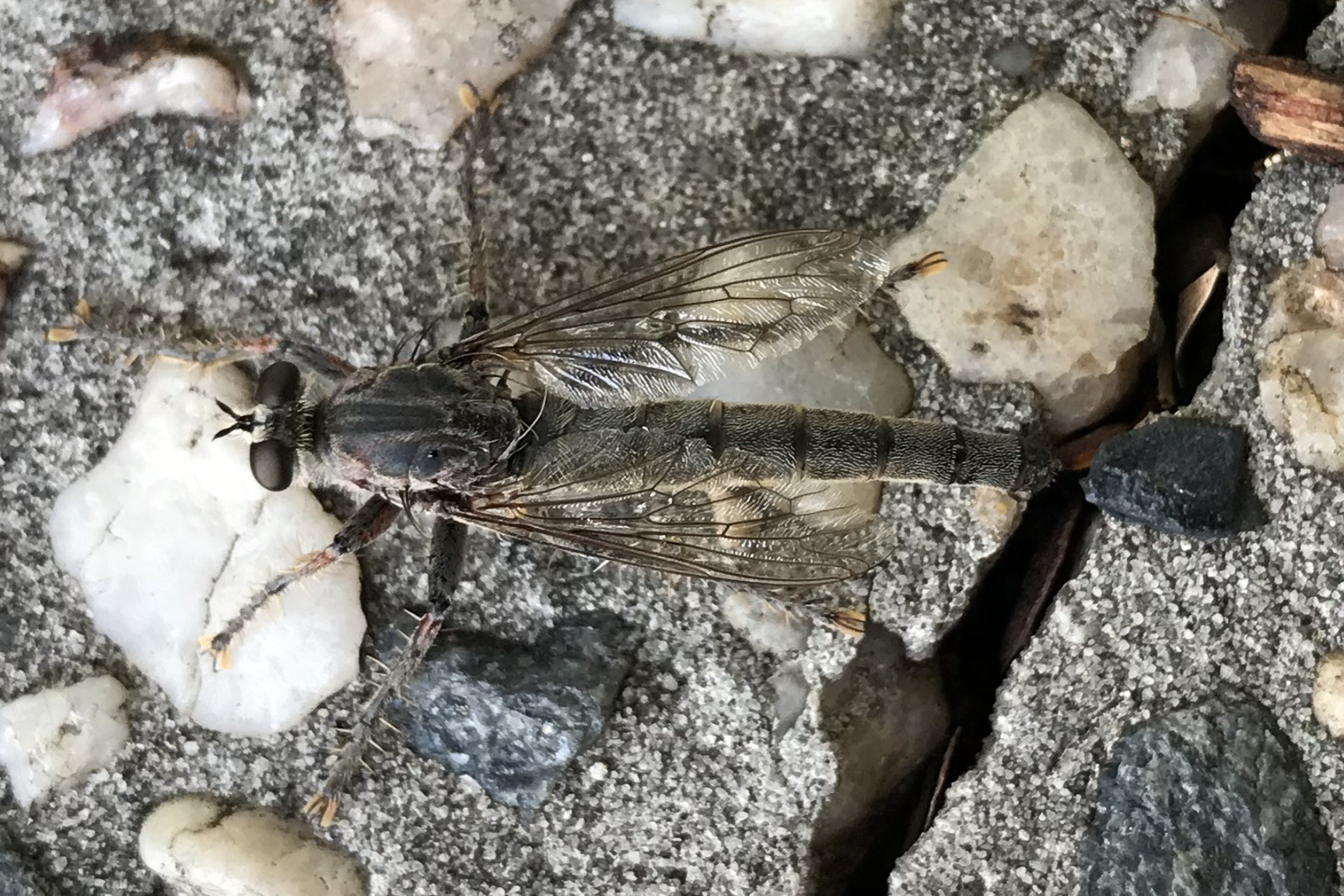
Bathypogon spp.

- Bathypogon aoris (Walker, 1849)
- Bathypogon asiliformis (Loew, 1851)
- Bathypogon bidentatus (Hull, 1958)
- Bathypogon boebius (Walker, 1849)
- Bathypogon brachypterus (Macquart, 1838)
- Bathypogon calabyi (Hull, 1958)
- Bathypogon chionthrix (Hull, 1958)
- Bathypogon cinereus (Hull, 1959)
- Bathypogon danielsi (Lavigne, 2006)
- Bathypogon douglasi (Hull, 1958)
- Bathypogon flavifemoratus (Hull, 1958)
- Bathypogon fulvus (Hull, 1956)
- Bathypogon griseus (Hull, 1956)
- Bathypogon hamaturus (Hull, 1956)
- Bathypogon ichthyurus (Hull, 1958)
- Bathypogon macrodonturus (Hull, 1959)
- Bathypogon maculipes (Bigot, 1879)
- Bathypogon magnus (Hull, 1956)
- Bathypogon microdonturus (Hull, 1958)
- Bathypogon mutilatus (Walker, 1855)
- Bathypogon nigrinus (Ricardo, 1912)
- Bathypogon nigrochaetus (Hull, 1956)
- Bathypogon nigrotibiatus (Hull, 1958)
- Bathypogon ochraceus (Hull, 1959)
- Bathypogon ophiurus (Hull, 1958)
- Bathypogon pedanus (Walker, 1849)
- Bathypogon posticus (Walker, 1855)
- Bathypogon robustus (Hull, 1956)
- Bathypogon rubellus (Hull, 1956)
- Bathypogon rubidapex (Hull, 1956)
- Bathypogon rufitarsus (Hull, 1958)
- Bathypogon testaceovittatus (Macquart, 1855)
- Bathypogon tristis (White, 1914)
- Bathypogon uncinatus (Hull, 1956)

=== Beameromyia ===
- Beameromyia bifida (Hardy, 1942)
- Beameromyia chrysops (Martin, 1957)
- Beameromyia dicrana (Scarbrough, 1997)
- Beameromyia disfascia (Martin, 1957)
- Beameromyia floridensis (Johnson, 1913)
- Beameromyia graminicola (Farr, 1963)
- Beameromyia incisuralis (Scarbrough & Perez-Gelabert, )
- Beameromyia insulara (Martin, 1957)
- Beameromyia kawiensis (Martin, 1957)
- Beameromyia lacinia (Martin, 1957)
- Beameromyia lunula (Martin, 1957)
- Beameromyia macula (Martin, 1957)
- Beameromyia melana (Scarbrough, 1997)
- Beameromyia monticola (Martin, 1957)
- Beameromyia occidentis (Hardy, 1942)
- Beameromyia prairiensis (Martin, 1957)
- Beameromyia punicea (Martin, 1957)
- Beameromyia quaterna (Scarbrough, 1997)
- Beameromyia silvacola (Martin, 1957)
- Beameromyia virginensis (Scarbrough, 1997)
- Beameromyia vulgaris (Martin, 1957)

=== Blepharepium ===
- Blepharepium auricinctum (Schiner, 1867)
- Blepharepium cajennensis (Fabricius, 1787)
- Blepharepium coarctatum (Perty, 1833)
- Blepharepium cunctabundum Papavero & Bernardi, 1973
- Blepharepium inca Curran, 1942
- Blepharepium luridum Rondani, 1848
- Blepharepium lynchi Carrera, 1949
- Blepharepium maculipennis (Macquart, 1855)
- Blepharepium priapus Papavero & Bernardi, 1973
- Blepharepium secabile (Walker, 1860)
- Blepharepium subcontractum (Walker, 1856)
- Blepharepium surumu Papavero & Bernardi, 1973
- Blepharepium sonorensis Papavero & Bernardi, 1973
- Blepharepium vorax Curran, 1942

=== Blepharotes ===
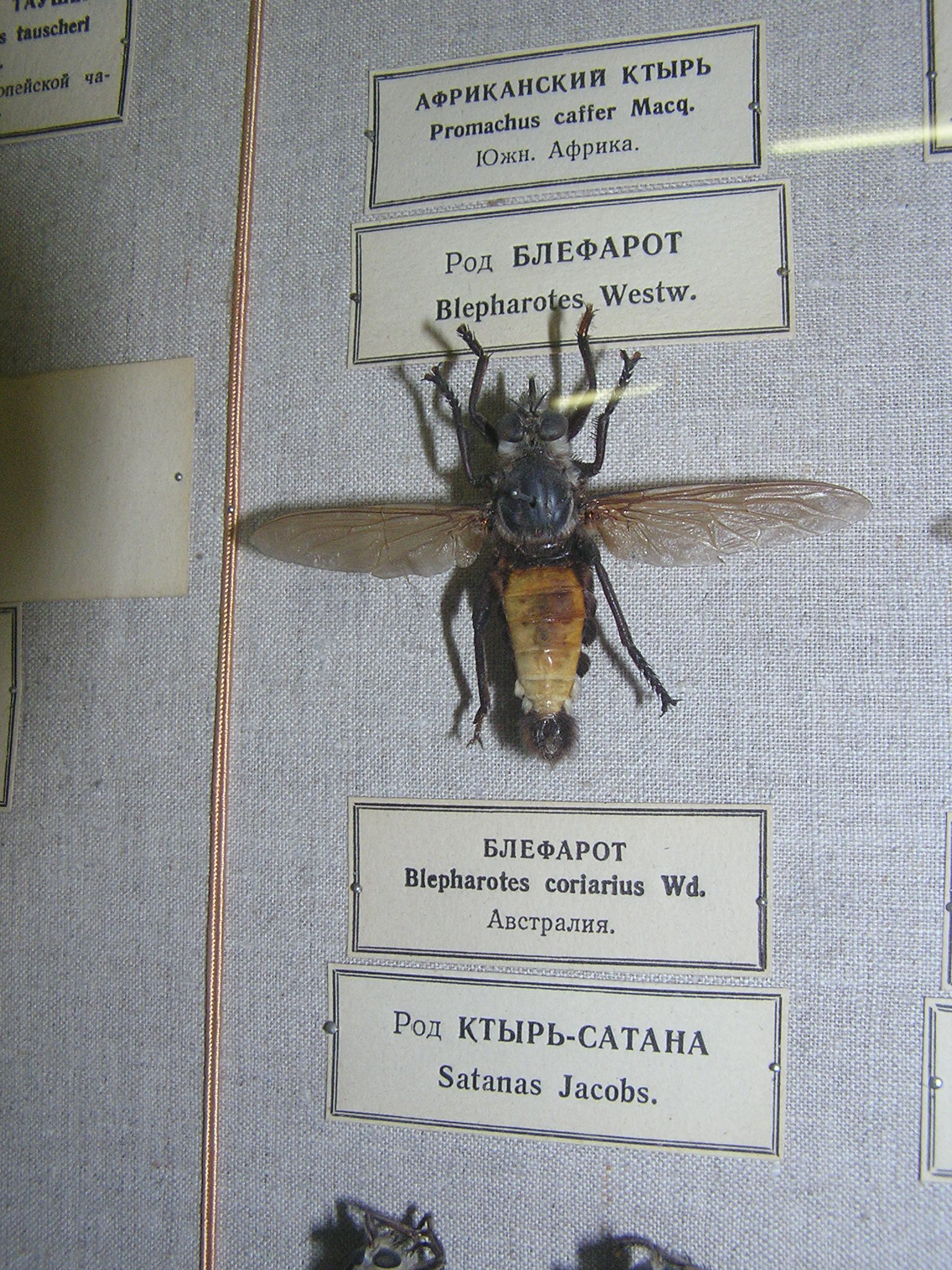
Blepharotes coriarius

- Blepharotes aterrimus (Hermann, 1907)
- Blepharotes coriarius (Wiedemann, 1830)
- Blepharotes rischbiethi (Lavigne & Young, 2009)
- Blepharotes vivax (Hermann, 1907)

=== Bohartia ===
- Bohartia bromleyi (Hull, 1958)
- Bohartia isabella (Adisoemarto & Wood, 1975)
- Bohartia martini (Adisoemarto & Wood, 1975)
- Bohartia munda (Adisoemarto & Wood, 1975)
- Bohartia nitor (Adisoemarto & Wood, 1975)
- Bohartia senecta (Adisoemarto & Wood, 1975)
- Bohartia tenuis (Adisoemarto & Wood, 1975)

=== Borapisma ===
- Borapisma chinai (Hull, 1957)

=== Brachyrhopala ===
- Brachyrhopala aurimaculata (Clements, 2000)
- Brachyrhopala danielsi (Clements, 2000)
- Brachyrhopala flava (Clements, 2000)
- Brachyrhopala nigra (Clements, 2000)
- Brachyrhopala ochracea (Clements, 2000)
- Brachyrhopala quadrata (Clements, 2000)
- Brachyrhopala rubrithorax (Clements, 2000)
- Brachyrhopala scutellata (Clements, 2000)
- Brachyrhopala semirufa (Hardy, 1929)
- Brachyrhopala soluta (Walker, 1861)

=== Brevirostrum ===
- Brevirostrum coei (Oldroyd, 1964)

=== Bromleyus ===
- Bromleyus flavidorsus (Hardy, 1944)

=== Bromotheres ===
- Bromotheres australis (Ricardo, 1913)
- Bromotheres culicivorus (White, 1918)

=== Broticosia ===
- Broticosia calabyi (Paramonov, 1964)
- Broticosia calignea (Daniels, 1975)
- Broticosia paramonovi (Hull, 1962)
- Broticosia rapax (Hull, 1958)

=== Burmapogon ===
- Burmapogon bruckschi (Dikow, 2014)
