= Nannocyrtopogon irvinei =

Scientific classification
- Domain: Eukaryota
- Kingdom: Animalia
- Phylum: Arthropoda
- Class: Insecta
- Order: Diptera
- Family: Asilidae
- Genus: Nannocyrtopogon
- Species: N. irvinei

Binomial name
- Nannocyrtopogon irvinei Wilcox & Martin, 1957

Species of fly

Nannocyrtopogon irvinei is a species of robber flies in the family Asilidae.
