= Ospriocerus aeacus =

Scientific classification
- Domain: Eukaryota
- Kingdom: Animalia
- Phylum: Arthropoda
- Class: Insecta
- Order: Diptera
- Family: Asilidae
- Genus: Ospriocerus
- Species: O. aeacus

Binomial name
- Ospriocerus aeacus (Wiedemann, 1828)

Synonyms
- Asilus abdominalis Say, 1824; Dasypogon aeacus Wiedemann, 1828; Ospriocerus aeacides Loew, 1866; Ospriocerus ventralis Coquillett, 1898

Species of fly

Ospriocerus aeacus is a species of robber flies (insects in the family Asilidae).
