= Blepharotes aterrimus =

Scientific classification
- Domain: Eukaryota
- Kingdom: Animalia
- Phylum: Arthropoda
- Class: Insecta
- Order: Diptera
- Family: Asilidae
- Genus: Blepharotes
- Species: B. aterrimus

Binomial name
- Blepharotes aterrimus (Hermann, 1907)

Species of fly

Blepharotes aterrimus is a species of assassin fly native to Indonesia.

== See also ==
- List of Asilidae species
