= Ospriocerus =

Scientific classification
- Domain: Eukaryota
- Kingdom: Animalia
- Phylum: Arthropoda
- Class: Insecta
- Order: Diptera
- Family: Asilidae
- Genus: Ospriocerus

Genus of flies

Ospriocerus is a genus of robber flies (insects in the family Asilidae). There are about 17 described species in Ospriocerus.

== Species ==
- Ospriocerus aeacidinus (Williston, 1886)
- Ospriocerus aeacus (Wiedemann, 1828)
- Ospriocerus arizonensis (Bromley, 193k7)
- Ospriocerus brevis Martin, 1968
- Ospriocerus ebyi (Bromley, 1937)
- Ospriocerus galadae Martin, 1968
- Ospriocerus latipennis (Loew, 1866)
- Ospriocerus longulus (Loew, 1866)
- Ospriocerus minos Osten Sacken, 1877
- Ospriocerus nitens (Coquillett, 1904)
- Ospriocerus parksi Bromley, 1934
- Ospriocerus pumilus Coquillett
- Ospriocerus rhadamanthus Loew, 1866
- Ospriocerus tenebrosus (Coquillett, 1904)
- Ospriocerus tequilae Martin, 1968
- Ospriocerus vallensis Martin, 1968
- Ospriocerus villus Martin, 1968
