= List of Asilidae species: G =

This article lists described species of the family Asilidae start with letter G.

A • B • C • D • E • F • G • H • I • J • K • L • M • N • O • P • Q • R • S • T • U • V • W • Y • Z

== List of species ==
=== Genus Galactopogon ===
- Galactopogon fumipennis (Janssens, 1961)
- Galactopogon hispidus (Engel, 1929)

=== Genus Gerrolasius ===
- Gerrolasius hermanni (Londt, 1988)
- Gerrolasius meridionalis (Hermann, 1920)
- Gerrolasius oldroydi (Londt, 1988)

=== Genus Gibbasilus ===
- Gibbasilus arenaceus (Londt, 1986)
- Gibbasilus brevicolis (Londt, 1990)
- Gibbasilus centrolobus (Londt, 1990)

=== Genus Glaphyropyga ===
- Glaphyropyga aristata (Carrera, 1950)
- Glaphyropyga attenuata (Hull, 1958)
- Glaphyropyga bolivari (Ayala, 1983)
- Glaphyropyga carrerai (Ayala, 1983)
- Glaphyropyga dryas (Fisher, 1982)
- Glaphyropyga himantocera (Wiedemann, 1828)
- Glaphyropyga pollinifera (Carrera, 1945)
- Glaphyropyga renatoi (Ayala, 1983)
- Glaphyropyga setosifemur (Enderlein, 1914)
- Glaphyropyga tachirensis (Ayala, 1983)
- Glaphyropyga tiarensis (Ayala, 1983)
- Glaphyropyga venezuelensis (Carrera & Machado-Allison, 1963)

=== Genus Glyphotriclis ===
- Glyphotriclis impulvinatus (Oldroyd, 1958)
- Glyphotriclis ornatus (Schiner, 1868)

=== Genus Goneccalypsis ===
- Goneccalypsis argenteoviridis (Hermann, 1907)
- Goneccalypsis gooti (Hradský & Geller-Grimm, 2000)
- Goneccalypsis lucida (Hermann, 1912)
- Goneccalypsis montanus (Londt, 1982)

=== Genus Gongromyia ===
- Gongromyia bulla (Londt, 2002)

=== Genus Gonioscelis ===
- Gonioscelis amnoni (Londt, 2004)
- Gonioscelis batyleon (Londt, 2004)
- Gonioscelis bykanistes (Londt, 2004)
- Gonioscelis ceresae (Oldroyd, 1974)
- Gonioscelis chloris (Londt, 2004)
- Gonioscelis congoensis (Oldroyd, 1970)
- Gonioscelis cuthbertsoni (Londt, 2004)
- Gonioscelis engeli (Londt, 2004)
- Gonioscelis exouros (Londt, 2004)
- Gonioscelis feijeni (Londt, 2004)
- Gonioscelis francoisi (Oldroyd, 1970)
- Gonioscelis genitalis (Ricardo, 1925)
- Gonioscelis hadrocantha (Londt, 2004)
- Gonioscelis haemorhous (Schiner, 1867)
- Gonioscelis iota (Londt, 2004)
- Gonioscelis kedros (Londt, 2004)
- Gonioscelis maculiventris (Bigot, 1879)
- Gonioscelis melas (Londt, 2004)
- Gonioscelis nigripennis (Ricardo, 1925)
- Gonioscelis occipitalis (Oldroyd, 1970)
- Gonioscelis phacopterus (Schiner, 1867)
- Gonioscelis pickeri (Londt, 2004)
- Gonioscelis pruinosus (Ricardo, 1925)
- Gonioscelis punctipennis (Engel, 1925)
- Gonioscelis scapularis (Macquart, 1838)
- Gonioscelis submaculatus (Speiser, 1910)
- Gonioscelis tomentosus (Oldroyd, 1970)
- Gonioscelis truncatus (Oldroyd, 1974)
- Gonioscelis whittingtoni (Londt, 2004)
- Gonioscelis xanthochaites (Londt, 2004)
- Gonioscelis zulu (Londt, 2004)

=== Genus Grajahua ===
- Grajahua lopesi (Artigas & Papavero, 1991)

=== Genus Graptostylus ===
- Graptostylus dolosus (Hull, 1962)

=== Genus Grypoctonus ===
- Grypoctonus engeli (Hradský & Geller-Grimm, 1999)
- Grypoctonus aino (Speiser, 1928)
- Grypoctonus lama (Speiser, 1928)

=== Genus Gymnotriclis ===
- Gymnotriclis coscaronorum (Artigas & Papavero, 1997)
