= Ospriocerus latipennis =

Scientific classification
- Domain: Eukaryota
- Kingdom: Animalia
- Phylum: Arthropoda
- Class: Insecta
- Order: Diptera
- Family: Asilidae
- Genus: Ospriocerus
- Species: O. latipennis

Binomial name
- Ospriocerus latipennis (Loew, 1866)

Synonyms
- Stenopogon consanguineus Loew, 1866; Stenopogon latipennis Loew, 1866

Species of fly

Ospriocerus latipennis is a species of robber flies (insects in the family Asilidae).
