= Nannocyrtopogon =

Scientific classification
- Domain: Eukaryota
- Kingdom: Animalia
- Phylum: Arthropoda
- Class: Insecta
- Order: Diptera
- Family: Asilidae
- Tribe: Stenopogonini
- Genus: Nannocyrtopogon; Wilcox & Martin, 1936

Genus of flies

Nannocyrtopogon is a genus of robber flies in the family Asilidae. There are at least 20 described species in Nannocyrtopogon.

== Species ==
These 28 species belong to the genus Nannocyrtopogon:

- Nannocyrtopogon antennatus Wilcox and Martin, 1957^{i c g}
- Nannocyrtopogon aristatus James, 1942^{i c g b}
- Nannocyrtopogon arnaudi Wilcox and Martin, 1957^{i c g}
- Nannocyrtopogon atripes Wilcox & Martin, 1936^{i c g b}
- Nannocyrtopogon bruneri Wilcox and Martin, 1957^{i c g}
- Nannocyrtopogon cerussatus (Osten Sacken, 1877)^{i c g}
- Nannocyrtopogon crumbi Wilcox and Martin, 1957^{i c g}
- Nannocyrtopogon deserti Wilcox and Martin, 1957^{i c g}
- Nannocyrtopogon howlandi Wilcox and Martin, 1957^{i c g}
- Nannocyrtopogon inyoi Wilcox & Martin, 1957^{i c g b}
- Nannocyrtopogon irvinei Wilcox & Martin, 1957^{i c g b}
- Nannocyrtopogon jbeameri Wilcox and Martin, 1957^{i g}
- Nannocyrtopogon lestomyiformis Wilcox and Martin, 1936^{i c g}
- Nannocyrtopogon mingusi Wilcox and Martin, 1957^{i c g}
- Nannocyrtopogon minutus Wilcox and Martin, 1936^{i c g}
- Nannocyrtopogon monrovia Wilcox and Martin, 1936^{i c g}
- Nannocyrtopogon neoculatus Wilcox and Martin, 1957^{i c g}
- Nannocyrtopogon nevadensis Wilcox and Martin, 1957^{i c g}
- Nannocyrtopogon nigricolor (Coquillett, 1904)^{i c g}
- Nannocyrtopogon nitidus Wilcox and Martin, 1957^{i c g}
- Nannocyrtopogon oculatus Wilcox and Martin, 1936^{i c g}
- Nannocyrtopogon richardsoni Wilcox and Martin, 1957^{i c g}
- Nannocyrtopogon sequoia Wilcox and Martin, 1957^{i g}
- Nannocyrtopogon stonei Wilcox and Martin, 1957^{i c g}
- Nannocyrtopogon timberlakei Wilcox and Martin, 1957^{i c g}
- Nannocyrtopogon tolandi Wilcox and Martin, 1957^{i c g}
- Nannocyrtopogon vanduzeei Wilcox & Martin, 1936^{i c g b}
- Nannocyrtopogon vandykei Wilcox and Martin, 1957^{i c g}

Data sources: i = ITIS, c = Catalogue of Life, g = GBIF, b = Bugguide.net
