= List of Asilidae species: R =

This article lists described species of the family Asilidae start with letter R.

A • B • C • D • E • F • G • H • I • J • K • L • M • N • O • P • Q • R • S • T • U • V • W • X • Y • Z

== List of species ==
=== Genus Rachiopogon ===
- Rachiopogon grantii (Newman, 1857)
- Rachiopogon rubescens (White, 1914)

=== Genus Reburrus ===
- Reburrus aquilonius (Daniels, 1987)
- Reburrus bancrofti (Hardy, 1935)
- Reburrus calcedonicae (Daniels, 1987)
- Reburrus macquarti (Bigot, 1860)
- Reburrus peninsularis (Daniels, 1987)

=== Genus Regasilus ===
- Regasilus strigarius (Curran, 1931)

=== Genus Remotomyia ===
- Remotomyia albosetatus (Hull, 1967)
- Remotomyia brunales (Londt, 1983)
- Remotomyia longipalpus (Londt, 1983)
- Remotomyia penrithae (Londt, 1983)

=== Genus Rhabdogaster ===
- Rhabdogaster atropalpus (Londt, 2006)
- Rhabdogaster bicolor (Londt, 2006)
- Rhabdogaster charma (Londt, 2006)
- Rhabdogaster cornuta (Londt, 2006)
- Rhabdogaster cuthbertsoni (Londt, 2006)
- Rhabdogaster eremia (Londt, 2006)
- Rhabdogaster etheira (Londt, 2006)
- Rhabdogaster glabra (Londt, 2006)
- Rhabdogaster kalyptos (Londt, 2006)
- Rhabdogaster karoo (Londt, 2006)
- Rhabdogaster kosmos (Londt, 2006)
- Rhabdogaster lindneri (Londt, 2006)
- Rhabdogaster maculipennis (Engel, 1929)
- Rhabdogaster major (Oldroyd, 1970)
- Rhabdogaster melas (Londt, 2006)
- Rhabdogaster nitida (Hull, 1967)
- Rhabdogaster nuda (Loew, 1858)
- Rhabdogaster nyx (Londt, 2006)
- Rhabdogaster oresbios (Londt, 2006)
- Rhabdogaster oribi (Londt, 2006)
- Rhabdogaster pedion (Londt, 2006)
- Rhabdogaster pellos (Londt, 2006)
- Rhabdogaster poa (Londt, 2006)
- Rhabdogaster pulverulentus (Loew, 1858)
- Rhabdogaster quasinuda (Londt, 2006)
- Rhabdogaster rustica (Oldroyd, 1974)
- Rhabdogaster sinis (Londt, 2006)
- Rhabdogaster tanylabis (Londt, 2006)
- Rhabdogaster theroni (Londt, 2006)
- Rhabdogaster xanthokelis (Londt, 2006)
- Rhabdogaster yeti (Londt, 2006)
- Rhabdogaster zebra (Londt, 2006)
- Rhabdogaster zilla (Londt, 2006)
- Rhabdogaster zopheros (Londt, 2006)

=== Genus Rhacholaemus ===
- Rhacholaemus artigasi (Londt, 1999)
- Rhacholaemus fisheri (Londt, 1999)
- Rhacholaemus grimmi (Londt, 1999)
- Rhacholaemus hradskyi (Londt, 1999)
- Rhacholaemus josephi (Londt, 1999)
- Rhacholaemus nelsoni (Londt, 1999)
- Rhacholaemus tsacasi (Londt, 1999)

=== Genus Rhadinus ===
- Rhadinus amicorum (Richter, 1966)
- Rhadinus khargaiensis (Efflatoun, 1937)
- Rhadinus laurae (Bezzi, 1922)
- Rhadinus mesasiaticus (Lehr, 1958)
- Rhadinus salinus (Lehr, 1984)
- Rhadinus socotrae (Geller-Grimm, 2002)
- Rhadinus tewfiki (Efflatoun, 1937)
- Rhadinus turkestanicus (Lehr, 1984)
- Rhadinus ungulinus (Loew, 1856)

=== Genus Rhadiurgus ===
- Rhadiurgus variabilis (Zetterstedt, [183)

=== Genus Rhipidocephala ===
- Rhipidocephala caffra (Macquart, 1846)
- Rhipidocephala congoiensis (Oldroyd, 1966)
- Rhipidocephala distincta (Oldroyd, 1966)
- Rhipidocephala divestita (Oldroyd, 1966)
- Rhipidocephala doornensis (Oldroyd, 1966)
- Rhipidocephala engeli (Oldroyd, 1966)
- Rhipidocephala fimbriata (Oldroyd, 1966)
- Rhipidocephala flavipes (Hermann, 1926)
- Rhipidocephala fulva (Oldroyd, 1966)
- Rhipidocephala insonspicua (Oldroyd, 1966)
- Rhipidocephala lambertoni (Bromley, 1942)
- Rhipidocephala manicata (Oldroyd, 1966)
- Rhipidocephala mirabilis (Hull, 1958)
- Rhipidocephala morio (Hermann, 1926)
- Rhipidocephala obscurata (Oldroyd, 1966)
- Rhipidocephala quadrifaria (Hermann, 1926)
- Rhipidocephala scutata (Oldroyd, 1966)
- Rhipidocephala signata (Hermann, 1907)
- Rhipidocephala speciosa (Oldroyd, 1966)
- Rhipidocephala tenera (Oldroyd, 1966)
- Rhipidocephala thoracica (Engel, 1946)
- Rhipidocephala tigrina (Janssens, 1953)
- Rhipidocephala umbripennis (Loew, 1858)
- Rhipidocephala zumpti (Oldroyd, 1966)

=== Genus Rhopalogaster ===
- Rhopalogaster albidus (Scarbrough & Perez-Gelabert, 2006)
- Rhopalogaster araujoi (Carrera, 1952)
- Rhopalogaster aurifer (Hermann, 1912)
- Rhopalogaster bella (Bromley, 1929)
- Rhopalogaster lineata (Hermann, 1912)
- Rhopalogaster longicornis (Wiedemann, 1828)
- Rhopalogaster micronyx (Tomasovic, 2002)
- Rhopalogaster niphardis (Hermann, 1912)

=== Genus Robertomyia ===
- Robertomyia lavignei (Londt, 1990)
