= List of Asilidae species: T =

This article lists described species of the family Asilidae start with letter T.

A • B • C • D • E • F • G • H • I • J • K • L • M • N • O • P • Q • R • S • T • U • V • W • Y • Z

== Genus Tanatchivia ==
- Tanatchivia chimaera (Hradský, 1983)
- Tanatchivia hradskyi (Tomasovic & Smets, 2007)

== Genus Taperigna ==
- Taperigna diogmitiformis (Artigas & Papavero, 1991)

== Genus Taracticus ==
- Taracticus aciculatus (Pritchard, 1938)
- Taracticus argentifacies (James, 1953)
- Taracticus contusus (Cockerell, 1910)
- Taracticus guerrerensis (Pritchard, 1938)
- Taracticus nigrimystaceus (Williston, 1901)
- Taracticus nigripes (Williston, 1901)
- Taracticus paulus (Pritchard, 1938)
- Taracticus renovatus (Cockerell, 1911)
- Taracticus ruficaudus (Curran, 1930)
- Taracticus rufipennis (Macquart, 1847)
- Taracticus similis (Williston, 1901)
- Taracticus vitripennis (Bellardi, 1861)

== Genus Taurhynchus ==
- Taurhynchus aurolineatus (Macquart, 1846)
- Taurhynchus barbiventris (Rondani, 1850)
- Taurhynchus bromleyi (Curran, 1931)
- Taurhynchus camposi (Curran, 1934)
- Taurhynchus cruentus (Lynch & Arribálzaga, 1880)
- Taurhynchus dina (Curran, 1934)
- Taurhynchus fervidus (Curran, 1934)
- Taurhynchus flavipennis (Macquart, 1846)
- Taurhynchus guianicus (Curran, 1934)
- Taurhynchus mystaceus (Macquart, 1846)
- Taurhynchus rubricornis (Macquart, 1838)
- Taurhynchus salti (Curran, 1934)
- Taurhynchus tibialis (Macquart, 1850)
- Taurhynchus vittatus (Lynch & Arribálzaga, 1880)
- Taurhynchus xanthopterus (Wiedemann, 1828)

== Genus Templasilus ==
- Templasilus bolivari (Arias, 1912)

== Genus Thallosia ==
- Thallosia congoicola (Oldroyd, 1970)

== Genus Theodoria ==
- Theodoria kimurai (Hradský & Hüttinger, 1984)

== Genus Thereutria ==
- Thereutria pulchra (Schiner, 1868)
- Thereutria pulchripes (White, 1918)
- Thereutria tesselata (Hardy, 1930)

== Genus Theromyia ==
- Theromyia nana (Pritchard, 1941)
- Theromyia pegnai (Artigas, 1970)

== Genus Theurgus ==
- Theurgus kerzneri (Lehr, 1974)
- Theurgus zimini (Richter, 1966)

== Genus Threnia ==
- Threnia acanthura (Wulp, 1898)
- Threnia carbonaria (Wiedemann, 1828)
- Threnia kelleri (Carrera, 1952)
- Threnia longipennis (Schiner, 1868)
- Threnia lugens (Schiner, 1868)
- Threnia microtelus (Wulp, 1898)
- Threnia rabelloi (Carrera, 1952)
- Threnia therimachus (Walker, 1851)

== Genus Tipulogaster ==
- Tipulogaster lancea (Tomasovic, 2002)

== Genus Tocantinia ==
- Tocantinia misera (Walker, 1854)

== Genus Tolmerus ==
- Tolmerus alamosae (Martin, 1975)
- Tolmerus albiceps (Becker, 1923)
- Tolmerus angustifrons (Loew, 1849)
- Tolmerus atripes (Loew, 1854)
- Tolmerus baezi (Hradský & Bosák, 2006)
- Tolmerus bolgaricus (Lehr, 1981)
- Tolmerus calvoides (Lehr, 1981)
- Tolmerus calvus (Lehr, 1972)
- Tolmerus costalis (Theodor, 1980)
- Tolmerus cowini (Hobby, 1946)
- Tolmerus cyrnaeus (Oldroyd, 1946)
- Tolmerus exiguus (Lehr, 1981)
- Tolmerus eximius (Becker, 1923)
- Tolmerus facialis (Becker, 1913)
- Tolmerus ferox (Becker, 1923)
- Tolmerus flavibarbatus (Becker, 1914)
- Tolmerus herbicola (Lehr, 1967)
- Tolmerus hermonensis (Theodor, 1980)
- Tolmerus hisamatsui (Tagawa, 1981)
- Tolmerus illucens (Becker, 1923)
- Tolmerus impiger (Becker, 1923)
- Tolmerus incommunis (Becker, 1923)
- Tolmerus inhonestus (Lehr, 1972)
- Tolmerus jacutensis (Lehr, 1975)
- Tolmerus katharinae (Theodor, 1980)
- Tolmerus lesinensis (Palm, 1876)
- Tolmerus lhassae (Tomasovic, 2005)
- Tolmerus maculipes (Lehr, 1972)
- Tolmerus major (Becker, 1907)
- Tolmerus maximus (Schiner, 1868)
- Tolmerus micans (Meigen, 1820)
- Tolmerus mirandus (Lehr, 1981)
- Tolmerus mongolicus (Moucha & Hradský, 1966)
- Tolmerus novarensis (Schiner, 1868)
- Tolmerus oromii (Hradský & Bosák, 2006)
- Tolmerus pamirensis (Lehr, 1981)
- Tolmerus pauper (Becker, 1923)
- Tolmerus pawaneeae (Martin, 1975)
- Tolmerus perfectus (Becker, 1923)
- Tolmerus poecilogaster (Loew, 1849)
- Tolmerus richterae (Lehr, 1981)
- Tolmerus rufescens (Lehr, 1975)
- Tolmerus rufostriatus (Theodor, 1980)
- Tolmerus shachristanicus (Lehr, 1981)
- Tolmerus socotrae (Geller-Grimm, 2002)
- Tolmerus strandi (Duda, 1940)
- Tolmerus strymonicus (Tsacas, 1960)
- Tolmerus tesselatus (Loew, 1849)
- Tolmerus tivonensis (Theodor, 1980)
- Tolmerus trifissilis (Séguy, 1929)
- Tolmerus vadimi (Lehr, 1981)
- Tolmerus ventriculus (Becker, 1923)
- Tolmerus vividus (Lehr, 1981)
- Tolmerus weinbergae (Hradský & Bosák, 2006)
- Tolmerus wraniki (Geller-Grimm, 2002)

== Genus Torasilus ==
- Torasilus solus (Londt, 2005)

== Genus Torebroma ==
- Torebroma gymnops (Hull, 1957)

== Genus Townsendia ==
- Townsendia albomacula (Martin, 1966)
- Townsendia araguensis (Kaletta, 1976)
- Townsendia arenicola (Scarbrough, 1995)
- Townsendia argyrata (Curran, 1926)
- Townsendia dilata (Martin, 1966)
- Townsendia fiebrigii (Bezzi, 1909)
- Townsendia gracilis (Martin, 1966)
- Townsendia minuta (Williston, 1895)
- Townsendia nemacula (Martin, 1966)
- Townsendia podexargenteus (Enderlein, 1914)
- Townsendia pulcherrima (Back, 1909)
- Townsendia triangulata (Martin, 1966)

== Genus Tricella ==
- Tricella calcar (Daniels, 1975)

== Genus Trichardis ==
- Trichardis afanasievae (Lehr, 1964)
- Trichardis apicalis (Oldroyd, 1974)
- Trichardis cinctella (Séguy, 1934)
- Trichardis cribrata (Loew, 1858)
- Trichardis katangaensis (Oldroyd, 1970)
- Trichardis lucifer (Oldroyd, 1974)
- Trichardis mongolica (Richter, 1972)
- Trichardis nigrescens (Ricardo, 1903)
- Trichardis picta (Hermann, 1906)
- Trichardis pohli (Geller-Grimm, 2002)
- Trichardis terminalis (Oldroyd, 1974)
- Trichardis turneri (Oldroyd, 1974)

== Genus Trichardopsis ==
- Trichardopsis dolicharista (Lehr, 1963)

== Genus Trichomachimus ==
- Trichomachimus angustus (Shi, 1992)
- Trichomachimus arnaudi (Joseph & Parui, 1997)
- Trichomachimus baratovi (Lehr, 1989)
- Trichomachimus basalis (Oldroyd, 1964)
- Trichomachimus conjugus (Shi, 1992)
- Trichomachimus curtusus (Lehr, 1989)
- Trichomachimus dontus (Shi, 1992)
- Trichomachimus elongatus (Shi, 1992)
- Trichomachimus excelsus (Ricardo, 1922)
- Trichomachimus grandis (Shi, 1992)
- Trichomachimus himachali (Parui & Kaur & Kapoor, 1994)
- Trichomachimus hirsutus (Bromley, 1935)
- Trichomachimus inundatus (Lehr, 1989)
- Trichomachimus kashmirensis (Oldroyd, 1964)
- Trichomachimus klapperichi (Moucha & Hradský, 1964)
- Trichomachimus lobus (Shi, 1992)
- Trichomachimus maculatus (Shi, 1992)
- Trichomachimus marginis (Shi, 1992)
- Trichomachimus nigricornis (Shi, 1992)
- Trichomachimus nigritarsus (Shi, 1992)
- Trichomachimus nigrus (Shi, 1992)
- Trichomachimus obliquus (Shi, 1992)
- Trichomachimus oldroydi (Moucha & Hradský, 1964)
- Trichomachimus omani (Parui & Joseph, 1994)
- Trichomachimus opulentus (Walker, 1851)
- Trichomachimus orientalis (Ricardo, 1922)
- Trichomachimus pallipes (Ricardo, 1922)
- Trichomachimus paludicola (Lehr, 1967)
- Trichomachimus pubescens (Ricardo, 1922)
- Trichomachimus quinlani (Oldroyd, 1964)
- Trichomachimus rubisetosus (Oldroyd, 1964)
- Trichomachimus rufus (Shi, 1992)
- Trichomachimus tenuis (Shi, 1992)
- Trichomachimus tubus (Shi, 1992)

== Genus Trichoura ==
- Trichoura krugeri (Londt, 1994)
- Trichoura mesochora (Londt, 1994)
- Trichoura pardeos (Londt and Dikow, 2016)
- Trichoura proctomeces (Londt, 1994)
- Trichoura tankwa (Londt, 1994)
- Trichoura torynopoda (Londt, 1994)
- Trichoura tyligma (Londt, 1994)

== Genus Triclioscelis ==
- Triclioscelis perfecta (Curran, 1934)
- Triclioscelis salti (Curran, 1931)

== Genus Triclis ==
- Triclis octodecimnotatus (Costa, 1893)
- Triclis rufescens (Austen, 1914)

== Genus Trigonomima ==
- Trigonomima anmaliensis (Joseph & Parui, 1997)
- Trigonomima apipes (Enderlein, 1914)
- Trigonomima argentea (Shi, 1992)
- Trigonomima canifrons (Enderlein, 1914)
- Trigonomima cyanella (Osten-Sacken, 1882)
- Trigonomima fuscopoda (Joseph & Parui, 1997)
- Trigonomima gibbera (Shi, 1992)
- Trigonomima nigra (Shi, 1992)
- Trigonomima penecyanella (Tomosovic, 2005)
- Trigonomima pennipes (Hermann, 1914)

== Genus Triorla ==
- Triorla parastriola (Pamplona & Cima & Aires, 1999)
- Triorla spinosa (Tomasovic, 2002)
- Triorla trichinus (Tomasovic, 2002)

== Genus Tsacasia ==
- Tsacasia wagneri (Artigas & Papavero, 1995)

== Genus Tsacasiella ==
- Tsacasiella debilis (Tsacas, 1969)
- Tsacasiella exilis (Tsacas, 1969)
- Tsacasiella inornata (Londt, 2002)
- Tsacasiella instabilis (Tsacas, 1969)
- Tsacasiella kivuensis (Tsacas, 1969)

== Genus Tuberculefferia ==
- Tuberculefferia producta (Hine, 1919)
- Tuberculefferia setigera (Wilcox, 1966)
- Tuberculefferia spiniventris (Hine, 1919)
- Tuberculefferia tuberculata (Coquillett, 1904)
- Tuberculefferia tucsoni (Wilcox, 1966)

== Genus Turkiella ==
- Turkiella nudus (Lehr, 1996)
- Turkiella zaitzevi (Lehr, 1996)
