= Burmapogon =

Burmapogon Temporal range: Cenomanian

Scientific classification
- Kingdom: Animalia
- Phylum: Arthropoda
- Class: Insecta
- Order: Diptera
- Family: Asilidae
- Genus: †Burmapogon; Dikow & Grimaldi, 2014

Type species
- Burmapogon bruckschi Dikow & Grimaldi, 2014

Extinct genus of flies

Burmapogon bruckschi is an extinct species of carnivorous assassin fly found in Burmese amber. The species is around 100 million years old.

== See also ==
- List of Asilidae species
