= Nannocyrtopogon inyoi =

Scientific classification
- Domain: Eukaryota
- Kingdom: Animalia
- Phylum: Arthropoda
- Class: Insecta
- Order: Diptera
- Family: Asilidae
- Genus: Nannocyrtopogon
- Species: N. inyoi

Binomial name
- Nannocyrtopogon inyoi Wilcox & Martin, 1957

Species of fly

Nannocyrtopogon inyoi is a species of robber flies in the family Asilidae.
