= List of Asilidae species: Y =

This article lists described species of the family Asilidae start with letter Y.

A • B • C • D • E • F • G • H • I • J • K • L • M • N • O • P • Q • R • S • T • U • V • W • Y • Z

== List of species ==
=== Genus Yksdarhus ===
- Yksdarhus lyneborgi (Hradský & Hüttinger, 1983)
