= Ospriocerus longulus =

Scientific classification
- Domain: Eukaryota
- Kingdom: Animalia
- Phylum: Arthropoda
- Class: Insecta
- Order: Diptera
- Family: Asilidae
- Genus: Ospriocerus
- Species: O. longulus

Binomial name
- Ospriocerus longulus (Loew, 1866)

Synonyms
- Stenopogon longulus Loew, 1866; Stenopogon tinkhami Bromley, 1951

Species of fly

Ospriocerus longulus is a species of robber flies (insects in the family Asilidae).
