= List of Asilidae species: K =

This article lists described species of the family Asilidae start with letter K.

A • B • C • D • E • F • G • H • I • J • K • L • M • N • O • P • Q • R • S • T • U • V • W • Y • Z

== List of species ==
=== Genus Katharma ===
- Katharma sanguinaria (Oldroyd, 1960)

=== Genus Katharmacercus ===
- Katharmacercus flagellatus (Oldroyd, 1960)
- Katharmacercus matilei (Menier & Tsacas, 2001)

=== Genus Ktyr ===
- Ktyr callarus Lehr, 1981
- Ktyr caucasicus (Richter, 1963)
- Ktyr elegans Lehr, 1972
- Ktyr junctus (Becker, 1923)
- Ktyr kazenasi Lehr, 1981
- Ktyr kerzhneri (Lehr, 1972)
- Ktyr normalis Lehr, 1981
- Ktyr protensis Lehr, 1981

=== Genus Ktyrimisca ===
- Ktyrimisca griseicolor (Lehr, 1964)
- Ktyrimisca rava (Lehr, 1967)
- Ktyrimisca setifemur (Lehr, 1967)
- Ktyrimisca stackelbergi (Lehr, 1967)
