= List of Asilidae species: U =

This article lists described species of the family Asilidae start with letter U.

A • B • C • D • E • F • G • H • I • J • K • L • M • N • O • P • Q • R • S • T • U • V • W • Y • Z

== List of species ==
=== Genus Udenopogon ===
- Udenopogon inscriptus (Becker, 1913)

=== Genus Ujguricola ===
- Ujguricola pergrisea (Lehr, 1970)
