= List of Asilidae species: W =

This article lists described species of the family Asilidae start with letter W.

A • B • C • D • E • F • G • H • I • J • K • L • M • N • O • P • Q • R • S • T • U • V • W • Y • Z

== List of species ==
=== Genus Wilcoxia ===
- Wilcoxia cinerea (James, 1941)
- Wilcoxia martinorum (Wilcox, 1972)
- Wilcoxia monae (Wilcox, 1972)
- Wilcoxia painteri (Wilcox, 1972)
- Wilcoxia pollinosa (Wilcox, 1972)

=== Genus Wilcoxius ===
- Wilcoxius acutulus (Martin, 1975)
- Wilcoxius caputitis (Scarbrough & Perez-Gelabert, 2005)
- Wilcoxius crenus (Martin, 1975)
- Wilcoxius juventus (Scarbrough & Perez-Gelabert, 2005)
- Wilcoxius planus (Scarbrough & Perez-Gelabert, 2005)
- Wilcoxius similis (Scarbrough & Perez-Gelabert, 2005)
- Wilcoxius truncus (Martin, 1975)
- Wilcoxius tumidus (Scarbrough & Perez-Gelabert, 2005)

=== Genus Wygodasilus ===
- Wygodasilus pulchripes (Bromley, 1928)

=== Genus Wyliea ===
- Wyliea chrysauges (Osten-Sacken, 1887)
