= List of Asilidae species: I =

This article lists described species of the family Asilidae start with letter I.

A • B • C • D • E • F • G • H • I • J • K • L • M • N • O • P • Q • R • S • T • U • V • W • Y • Z

== List of species ==
=== Genus Ichneumolaphria ===
- Ichneumolaphria fascipennis (Hermann, 1912)
- Ichneumolaphria schachti (Geller-Grimm, 1997)
- Ichneumolaphria zikani (Carrera, 1951)

=== Genus Illudium ===
- Illudium hibernum (Richter, 1962)

=== Genus Iranopogon ===
- Iranopogon brandti (Timon-David, 1955)
- Iranopogon gaspari (Tomasovic, 1999)

=== Genus Irwinomyia ===
- Irwinomyia argentea (Londt, 1994)
- Irwinomyia aurea (Londt, 1994)

=== Genus Ischiolobos ===
- Ischiolobos mesotopos (Londt, 2005)
- Ischiolobos notios (Londt, 2005)

=== Genus Itolia ===
- Itolia atripes (Wilcox, 1949)
- Itolia fascia (Martin, 1966)
- Itolia maculata (Wilcox, 1936)
- Itolia pilosa (Martin, 1966)
- Itolia timberlakei (Wilcox, 1949)
