= List of Asilidae species: Z =

This article lists described species of the family Asilidae start with letter Z.

A • B • C • D • E • F • G • H • I • J • K • L • M • N • O • P • Q • R • S • T • U • V • W • Y • Z

== List of species ==
=== Genus Zabrops ===
- Zabrops janiceae (Fisher, 1977)
- Zabrops thologaster (Fisher, 1977)
- Zabrops wilcoxi (Fisher, 1977)

=== Genus Zabrotica ===
- Zabrotica clarkei (Hull, 1958)

=== Genus Zelamyia ===
- Zelamyia alyctus (Londt, 2005)

=== Genus Zosteria ===
- Zosteria affinis (Daniels, 1987)
- Zosteria alpina (Daniels, 1987)
- Zosteria caesariata (Daniels, 1987)
- Zosteria calignea (Daniels, 1987)
- Zosteria claudiana (Daniels, 1987)
- Zosteria clausum (Daniels, 1987)
- Zosteria clivosa (Daniels, 1987)
- Zosteria eastwoodi (Daniels, 1987)
- Zosteria hispida (Daniels, 1987)
- Zosteria illingworthi (Hardy, 1922)
- Zosteria lineata (Daniels, 1987)
- Zosteria longiceps (Daniels, 1987)
- Zosteria montana (Daniels, 1987)
- Zosteria murina (Macquart, 1838)
- Zosteria nigrifemorata (Daniels, 1987)
- Zosteria novazealandica (Daniels, 1987)
- Zosteria punicea (Daniels, 1987)
- Zosteria queenslandi (Daniels, 1987)
- Zosteria rosevillensis (Hardy, 1935)
- Zosteria rubens (Daniels, 1987)
- Zosteria ruspata (Daniels, 1987)
- Zosteria suda (Daniels, 1987)
- Zosteria varia (Daniels, 1987)
- Zosteria venator (Daniels, 1987)

=== Genus Zoticus ===
- Zoticus fitzroyi (Artigas, 1974)
- Zoticus toconaoensis (Artigas, 1970)
