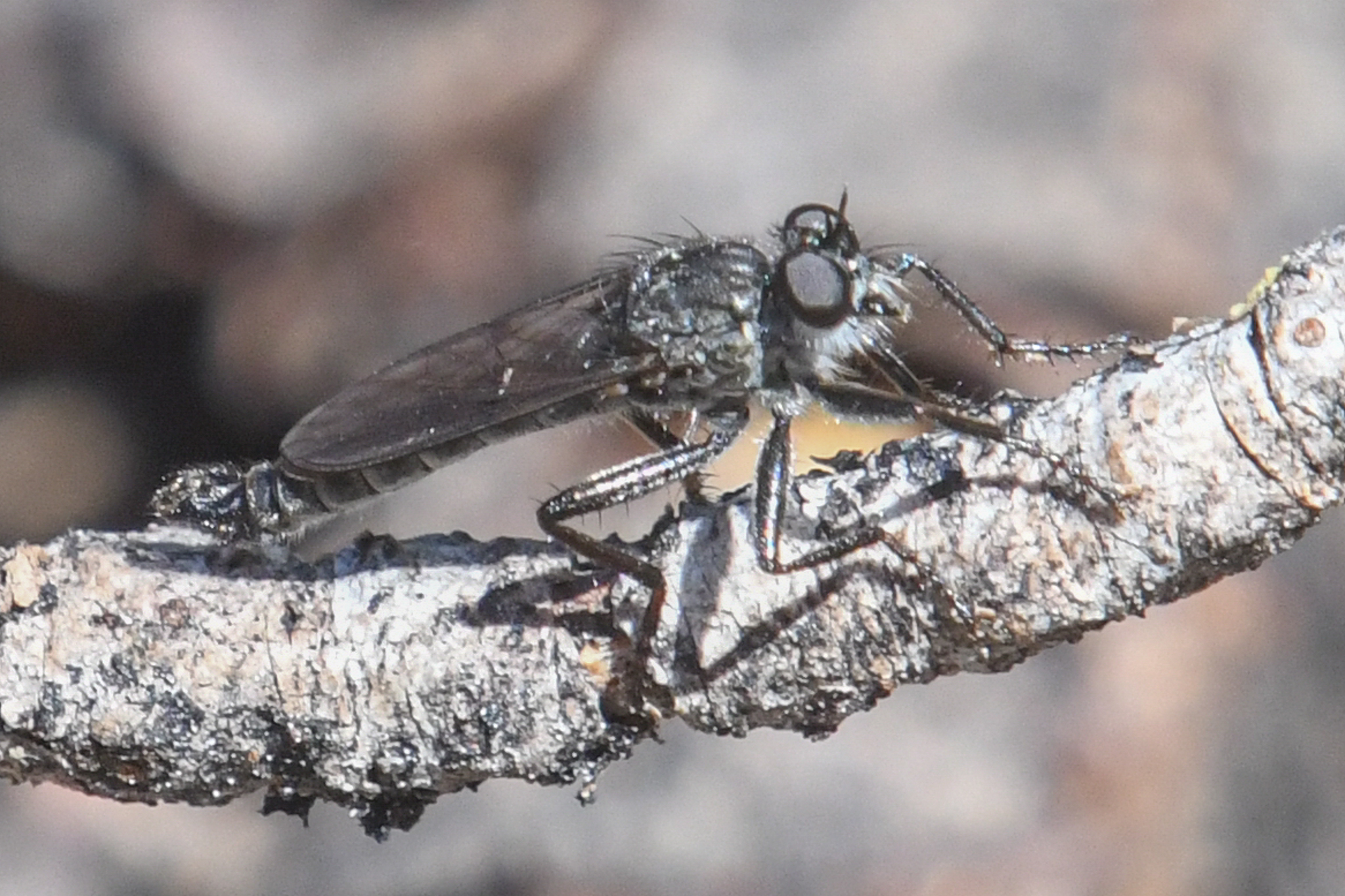

Scientific classification
- Kingdom: Animalia
- Phylum: Arthropoda
- Clade: Pancrustacea
- Class: Insecta
- Order: Diptera
- Family: Asilidae
- Genus: Rhadiurgus
- Species: R. variabilis

Binomial name
- Rhadiurgus variabilis (Zetterstedt [1838])

= Rhadiurgus variabilis =

Species of fly

Rhadiurgus variabilis is a species of robber fly in the family Asilidae found in the Holarctic region. It is a small, grey asilid (up to 12 mm.) Difficult to distinguish from other Rhadiurgus and some Machimus. Wolff, Gebel and Geller-Grimm (2021), Majer (1997), van den Broek (1979), and Stubbs and Drake (2001) all provide keys, descriptions and illustrations. Older works are also useful, e.g., Seguy (1920) and Oldroyd (1969).
