= List of Asilidae species: Q =

This article lists described species of the family Asilidae start with letter Q.

A • B • C • D • E • F • G • H • I • J • K • L • M • N • O • P • Q • R • S • T • U • V • W • Y • Z

== List of species ==
=== Genus Questopogon ===
- Questopogon affinis (Daniels, 1976)
- Questopogon clarkii (Dakin & Fordham, 1922)
- Questopogon guttatus (Daniels, 1976)
- Questopogon lineatus (Daniels, 1976)
