= Nannocyrtopogon aristatus =

Scientific classification
- Kingdom: Animalia
- Phylum: Arthropoda
- Class: Insecta
- Order: Diptera
- Family: Asilidae
- Genus: Nannocyrtopogon
- Species: N. aristatus

Binomial name
- Nannocyrtopogon aristatus James, 1942

Species of fly

Nannocyrtopogon aristatus is a species of robber flies in the family Asilidae.
