= Nannocyrtopogon atripes =

Scientific classification
- Domain: Eukaryota
- Kingdom: Animalia
- Phylum: Arthropoda
- Class: Insecta
- Order: Diptera
- Family: Asilidae
- Genus: Nannocyrtopogon
- Species: N. atripes

Binomial name
- Nannocyrtopogon atripes Wilcox & Martin, 1936

Species of insect

Nannocyrtopogon atripes is a species of robber flies in the family Asilidae.
