= List of Asilidae species: F =

This article lists described species of the family Asilidae start with letter F.

A • B • C • D • E • F • G • H • I • J • K • L • M • N • O • P • Q • R • S • T • U • V • W • Y • Z

== List of species ==
=== Genus Filiolus ===
- Filiolus alenkae (Lehr, 1995)
- Filiolus baratovi (Lehr, 1995)
- Filiolus kamkalensis (Lehr, 1995)
- Filiolus lopatini (Lehr, 1967)
- Filiolus serkovae (Lehr, 1995)
- Filiolus tarbagataicus (Lehr, 1995)
- Filiolus tchernovi (Lehr, 1995)
- Filiolus tugajorum (Lehr, 1961)

=== Genus Furcilla ===
- Furcilla dorothyae (Martin, 1975)
- Furcilla petila (Martin, 1975)
