= List of Asilidae species: V =

This article lists described species of the family Asilidae start with letter V.

A • B • C • D • E • F • G • H • I • J • K • L • M • N • O • P • Q • R • S • T • U • V • W • Y • Z

== List of species ==
=== Genus Valiraptor ===
- Valiraptor montanus (Londt, 2002)
- Valiraptor namibiensis (Londt, 2002)
- Valiraptor silvestris (Londt, 2002)
- Valiraptor vittatus (Londt, 2002)
