= Ospriocerus brevis =

Scientific classification
- Domain: Eukaryota
- Kingdom: Animalia
- Phylum: Arthropoda
- Class: Insecta
- Order: Diptera
- Family: Asilidae
- Genus: Ospriocerus
- Species: O. brevis

Binomial name
- Ospriocerus brevis Martin, 1968

Species of fly

Ospriocerus brevis is a species of robber flies (insects in the family Asilidae).
