= List of Asilidae species: J =

This article lists described species of the family Asilidae start with letter J.

A • B • C • D • E • F • G • H • I • J • K • L • M • N • O • P • Q • R • S • T • U • V • W • Y • Z

== List of species ==
=== Genus Joartigasia ===
- Joartigasia anceps (Hermann, 1912)
- Joartigasia rubriventris (Hermann, 1912)
- Joartigasia ruficaudis (Hermann, 1912)

=== Genus Jothopogon ===
- Jothopogon leucomallus (Loew, 1871)
- Jothopogon niveicolor (Lehr, 1972)

=== Genus Juxtasilus ===
- Juxtasilus capensis (Londt, 1979)
