= Gertrude Ricardo =

British entomologist and taxonomist

- Born: 11 September 1862; Gatcombe Park, UK
- Died: 31 October 1950 (aged 88); Pilton, Somerset, UK
- Occupation: Entomologist Taxonomist
- Scientific career
- Workplaces: British Museum (Natural History)

Gertrude Ricardo (11 September 1862 - 31 October 1950) was a British entomologist and taxonomist who specialised in Diptera, particularly the families Asilidae (assassin flies) and Tabanidae (horseflies and deerflies).

== Biography ==
Gertrude Ricardo was born at Gatcombe Park House in Gloucestershire on 11 September 1862 and baptised on 15 October 1862 as Ellen Gertrude Ricardo at Minchinhampton church, Gloucestershire. Her parents were Henry David Ricardo (1833–1873) and his wife Ellen (née Crawley, 1839–1902). Ricardo's grandfather was the Liberal Member of Parliament David Ricardo the younger (1803–1864) and her great-grandfather was the economist and Whig Member of Parliament David Ricardo (1772–1823).

Ricardo was one of 11 siblings. The early education of the Ricardo children was at home, by a governess from Jersey named Julia Le Couteur.

Gertrude's father Henry David Ricardo died at the age of 39 in 1873 and her older brother Henry George Ricardo (1860–1940) inherited Gatcombe Park, though it was held in trust for Henry George until he reached majority.

In 1895 Ricardo was living at number 25 Cleveland Square, Hyde Park, a house that was the residence of her mother Ellen. Ricardo was listed as an Associate of The Sanitary Institute; she had also passed examination to become an Inspector of Nuisance - this role would have involved trying to protect the public from sources of disease and contaminated food and was a precursor to the modern role of Public Health Inspector.

By the early 1900s Ricardo lived at 12 Cottesmore Gardens in Kensington with her sister Katharine Cecil Ricardo (1865-1957); both were listed as registered to vote in local elections, which had become legal for property-owning women after the Local Government Act 1894.

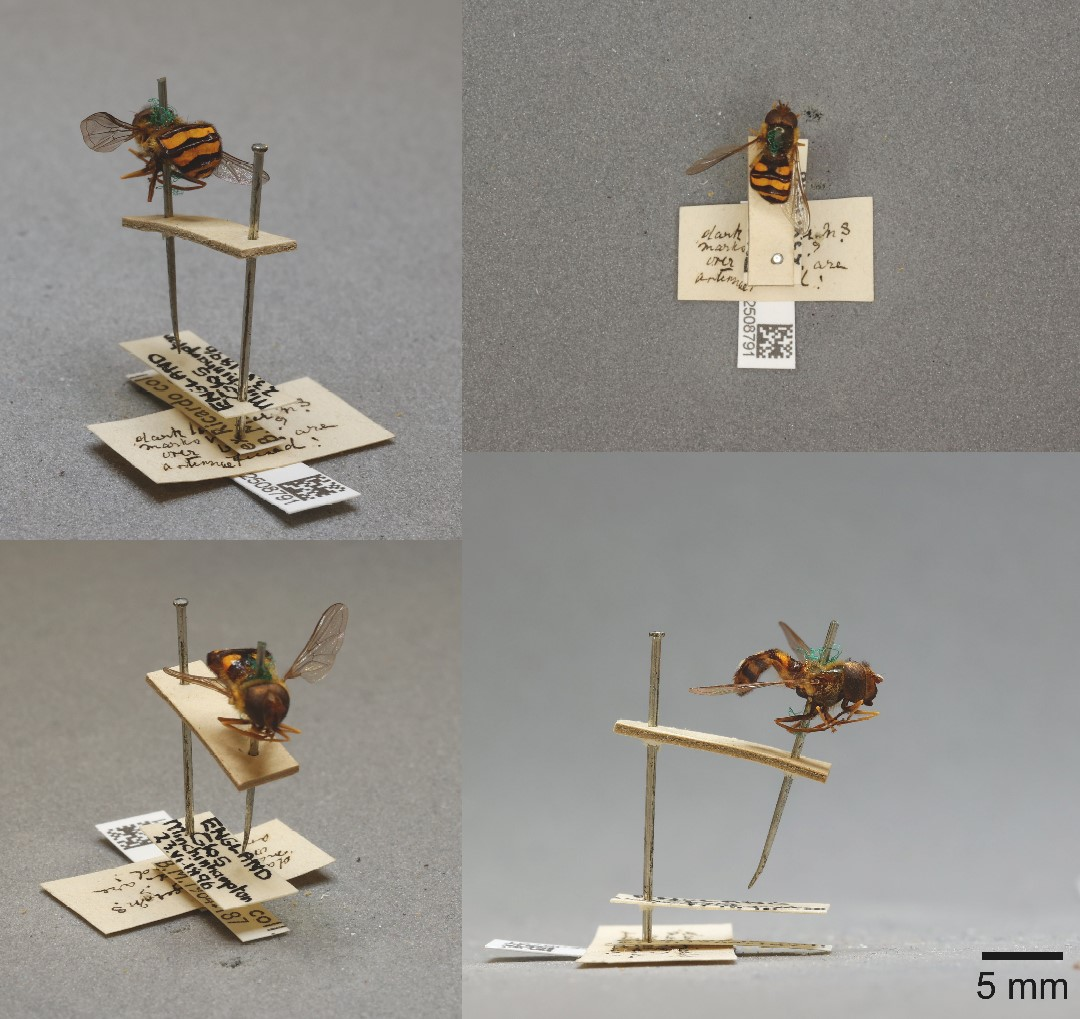
four views of a specimen of the hoverfly species Eupeodes nitens (Zetterstedt, 1843) collected by Gertrude Ricardo on 23 June 1896 at Minchinhampton, Gloucestershire (NHMUK012508791)

From 1900 Ricardo began to publish taxonomy research papers based upon her studies of Diptera in the collection of the British Museum (Natural History). Some of Ricardo's work included examining flies collected in South Africa by William Lucas Distant and working with Pangoniinae material from the Budapest Museum which had been loaned to her by Kálmán Kertész so that she could compare them with Types from the collection of Francis Walker. In 1906 George Henry Verrall allowed Ricardo to borrow material from his private collection for her work on the genus Haematopota. Ricardo also worked on Tabanid flies from Algeria collected by Alfred Edwin Eaton. Ricardo was associated with the British Museum until 1927, and during her time working there she described many new Diptera species (see selected list below). The British Museum's Keeper of Entomology Norman Denbigh Riley (1890–1979) summed up Ricardo's work like this in 1964: "she broke new ground, but left it very rough."

Ricardo's brother William Crawley Ricardo (1864–1946) had emigrated to North America in 1895 with the intention of working as a ranchman, later becoming resident in the Vernon area of British Columbia, Canada. In 1901 William was managing a farm at Vernon and living with another Ricardo sister, Arabel Mary Ricardo (later Hodges, 1868–1954). In 1902 Gertrude Ricardo traveled to Canada, including a visit to the area where her siblings lived, and she would later send a collection she had made of Canadian Hymenoptera to Charles Thomas Bingham at the British Museum. Bees collected by Ricardo at Vernon and Calgary were examined in 1912 by Theodore D. A. Cockerell, from which he described two new species: Stelis ricardonis (Cockerell, 1912) named in Ricardo's honour (originally named as Chelynia ricardonis, also known as Ricardo's Cuckoo Carder bee), and Megachile vernonensis Cockerell, 1912.

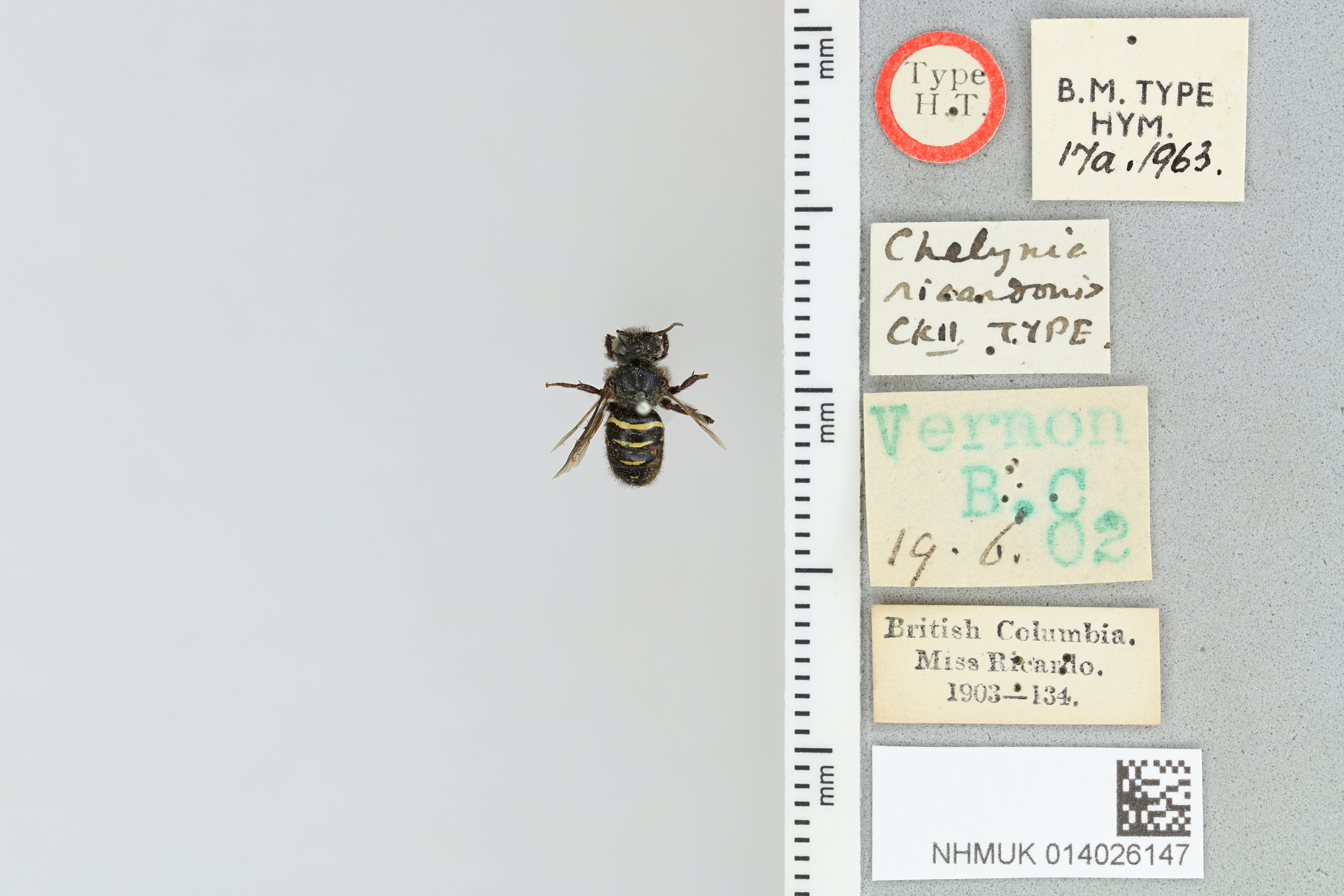
Holotype specimen of the bee species Stelis ricardonis (Cockerell, 1912), collected by Gertrude Ricardo at Vernon, British Columbia, on 19 June 1902 (NHMUK014026147)

In 1938 Ricardo was presented with a medal bearing an image of King Leopold III of Belgium for her work on material from Leopold III's tour of the Far East in 1928–1929.

In later life Ricardo lived at Phelps House, Castle Cary, Somerset, with her sisters Katharine Cecil Ricardo and Rachel Bertha Ricardo (1870–1961): all three women were described in 1939 as living by independent financial means and supported by two domestic servants. In the 1940s Ricardo occasionally opened Phelps House garden to the public as part of a scheme to raise money for local nursing charities. In February 1946 Ricardo enquired of Norman Denbigh Riley at the British Museum as to how to best divest her personal library of books about Diptera; Riley's reply suggesting that she donate them to the Museum survives in the NHM Archives.

Ricardo died at Springfield House, Pilton, Somerset, on 31 October 1950 at the age of 88.

Ricardo's own Diptera collection was gifted to the British Museum (Natural History) by her sister Rachel Bertha Ricardo.

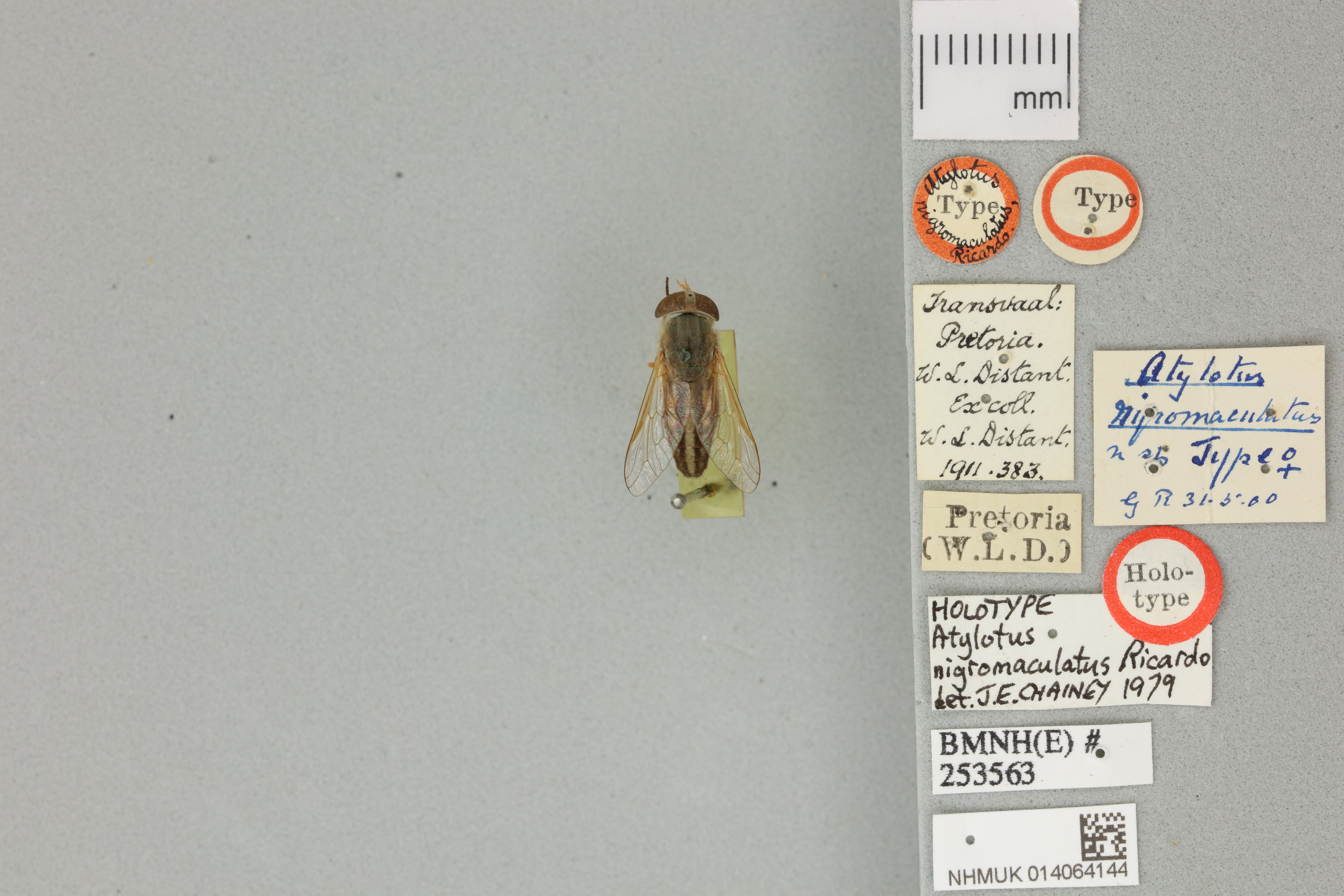
Holotype specimen of Atylotus nigromaculatus, collected by William Lucas Distant at Pretoria, South Africa and described by Gertrude Ricardo in 1900 (NHMUK014064144, NHMUK253563)

== Selected species described by Gertrude Ricardo ==
Current taxonomic status is listed, if known (checked on Systema Dipterorum).

=== Diptera: Family Asilidae ===
- Alcimus brevipennis Ricardo, 1922 [valid]
- Alcimus cinerascens Ricardo, 1900 [valid as combination Philodicus cinerascens (Ricardo, 1900)]
- Alcimus nigrescens Ricardo, 1922 [valid]
- Asilus montanus Ricardo, 1922 [homonym, valid as Orophotus montanus (Ricardo, 1922)]
- Asilus orientalis Ricardo, 1922 [valid as combination Trichomachimus orientalis (Ricardo, 1922)]
- Asilus pulcher Ricardo, 1922
- Dysmachus robustus Ricardo, 1922 [valid as combination Neolophonotus robustus (Ricardo, 1922)]
- Heligmonevra trisignata Ricardo, 1922 [valid as combination Neomochtherus trisignatus (Ricardo, 1922)]
- Laparus albicinctus Ricardo, 1900 [valid as combination Pegesimallus albicinctus (Ricardo, 1900)]
- Laphria aureopilosa Ricardo, 1900 [valid]
- Lophonotus albofasciatus Ricardo, 1900 [valid as combination Neolophonotus albofasciatus (Ricardo, 1900)]
- Machimus assamensis Ricardo, 1919 [valid]
- Machimus chinensis Ricardo, 1919 [valid]
- Machimus excelsus Ricardo, 1922 [valid as combination Trichomachimus excelsus (Ricardo, 1922)]
- Machimus pallipes Ricardo, 1922 [valid]
- Machimus pubescens Ricardo, 1922 [valid as combination Trichomachimus pubescens (Ricardo, 1922)]
- Machimus rufipes Ricardo, 1922 [valid]
- Microstylum elegans Ricardo, 1900 [junior synonym of Microstylum lituratum Loew, 1863]
- Microstylum glabrum Ricardo, 1900 [junior synonym of Microstylum gulosum Loew, 1858]
- Microstylum nigrescens Ricardo, 1900 [valid]
- Ommatius fuscovittatua Ricardo, 1900 [valid as combination Longibeccus fuscovittatua (Ricardo, 1900)]
- Philodicus dubius Ricardo, 1921 [valid]
- Philodicus femoralis Ricardo, 1921 [valid]
- Philodicus fuscipes Ricardo, 1921 [valid]
- Philodicus grandissimus Ricardo, 1921 [valid]
- Philodicus meridionalis Ricardo, 1921 [valid]
- Philodicus nigrescens Ricardo, 1921 [valid]
- Philodicus pallidipennis Ricardo, 1921 [valid]
- Philodicus thoracicus Ricardo 1921 [valid as Philodicus thoracinus Ricardo, 1921]
- Philodicus umbripennis Ricardo, 1921 [junior synonym of Philodicus cinerascens (Ricardo, 1900)]
- Promachus abdominalis Ricardo, 1920 [valid]
- Promachus adamsi Ricardo, 1920 [valid]
- Promachus albicinctus Ricardo, 1900 [valid]
- Promachus beesoni Ricardo, 1921 [valid]
- Promachus bicolor Ricardo, 1900 [junior synonym of Promachus amastrus (Walker, 1849)]
- Promachus breviventris Ricardo, 1920 [valid]
- Promachus obscuripes Ricardo, 1920 [valid]
- Promachus pallidus Ricardo, 1921 [valid]
- Promachus rufescens Ricardo, 1920 [valid]
- Promachus simpsoni Ricardo, 1920 [valid]
- Promachus sokotrae Ricardo, 1903 in ed. Forbes, 1903 [valid]
- Promachus ugandiensis Ricardo, 1920 [valid]
- Scylaticus rufescens Ricardo, 1900 [valid]
- Tolmerus angularis Ricardo, 1922 [valid as combination Machimus angularis (Ricardo, 1922)]
- Tolmerus hirsutus Ricardo, 1922 [valid as combination Machimus hirsutus (Ricardo, 1922)]
- Tolmerus nigripes Ricardo, 1922 [valid as combination Machimus nigripes (Ricardo, 1922)]
- Tolmerus parvus Ricardo, 1922 [junior synonym of Machimus retrospectus Oldroyd, 1975]
- Tolmerus rubripes Ricardo, 1922 [valid as combination Heligmonevra rubripes (Ricardo, 1922)]

=== Diptera: Family Bombyliidae ===
- Exoprosopa basalis Ricardo, 1901 [valid as combination Litorhina basalis (Ricardo, 1901)]
- Exoprosopa elongata Ricardo, 1901 [valid]
- Exoprosopa major Ricardo, 1901 [valid]
- Exoprosopa nova Ricardo, 1901
- Exoprosopa nyasae Ricardo, 1901 [valid as combination Litorhina nyasae (Ricardo, 1901)]
- Exoprosopa parva Ricardo, 1901 [junior primary homonym with Exoprosopa parvula Bezzi, 1921]
- Exoprosopa unifasciata Ricardo, 1901 [valid]
- Hyperalonia vittata Ricardo, 1901 [valid as combination Ligyra vittata (Ricardo, 1901)]
- Lomatia nigrescens Ricardo, 1901 [valid as combination Notolomatia nigrescens (Ricardo, 1901)]

=== Diptera: Family Rhagionidae ===
- Pelecorhynchus aurantiacus Ricardo 1900 [junior synonym of Pelecorhynchus vulpes (Macquart, 1850)].
- Pelecorhynchus darwini Ricardo 1900 [junior synonym of Pelecorhynchus elegans (Philippi, 1865)].

=== Diptera: Family Tabanidae ===
- Atylotus nigromaculatus Ricardo, 1900 [valid]
- Cadicera nigrescens Ricardo, 1900 [junior synonym of Philoliche (Phara) rubramarginata (Macquart, 1855)]
- Chrysops brasiliensis Ricardo, 1901 [junior synonym of Chrysops incisus Macquart, 1846]
- Chrysops flavocinctus Ricardo, 1902 [valid]
- Chrysops fuscipennis Ricardo, 1902 [valid]
- Chrysops indianus Ricardo, 1902 [valid]
- Chrysops madagascarensis Ricardo, 1902 [valid]
- Corizoneura distincta Ricardo, 1908 [valid as combination Philoliche (Stenophara) distincta (Ricardo, 1908)]
- Corizoneura obscura Ricardo, 1908 [junior synonym: junior secondary homonym with Philoliche (Phara) ricardoae Chainey & Oldroyd, 1980]
- Corizoneura pallidipennis Ricardo, 1900 [junior synonym of Philoliche (Philoliche) rondani (Bertoloni, 1861)]
- Corizoneura umbratipennis Ricardo, 1900 [valid as combination Philoliche (Philoliche) umbratipennis (Ricardo, 1900)]
- Diatomineura longipennis Ricardo, 1902 [valid as combination Pseudoscione longipennis (Ricardo, 1902)]
- Diatomineura minima Ricardo, 1900 [junior synonym of Scaptia (Scaptia) subcana Walker]
- Diatomineura leucothorax Ricardo, 1900 [changed rank / combination, accepted as Sixtomyia leucothorax, Philippi]
- Diatomineura seminigra Ricardo, 1902 [valid as combination Lepmia seminigra (Ricardo, 1902)]
- Erephrosis aureohirta Ricardo, 1900 [valid as combination Copidapha aureohirta (Ricardo, 1900)]
- Erephrosis fulvitibialis Ricardo, 1900
- Erephrosis fuscus Ricardo, 1902
- Erephrosis niger Ricardo, 1900
- Erephrosis rufescens Ricardo, 1900 [accepted as Scione rufescens (Ricardo, 1900)]
- Erephrosis rufopilosus Ricardo 1900
- Haematopota bipunctata Ricardo, 1906 [valid]
- Haematopota brevis Ricardo, 1906 [valid]
- Haematopota brunnescens Ricardo, 1906 [valid]
- Haematopota brunnipennis Ricardo, 1906 [valid]
- Haematopota cingalensis Ricardo, 1906 [valid]
- Haematopota distincta Ricardo, 1906 [valid]
- Haematopota hindostani Ricardo, 1917 [valid]
- Haematopota lata Ricardo, 1906
- Haematopota longa Ricardo, 1906 [valid]
- Haematopota montanus Ricardo, 1917 [accepted as Haematopota montana Ricardo, 1917]
- Haematopota nigrescens Ricardo, 1906 [junior synonym of Haematopota hirta Ricardo, 1906]
- Haematopota rubida Ricardo, 1906 [valid]
- Haematopota similis Ricardo, 1906 [valid]
- Haematopota singularis Ricardo, 1908 [valid]
- Haematopota tessellata Ricardo, 1906 [valid]
- Haematopota ugandae Ricardo, 1906 [valid]
- Haematopota unicolor Ricardo, 1906 [valid]
- Haematopota unizonata Ricardo, 1906 [valid]
- Pangonia elongata Ricardo, 1908 [valid as combination Philoliche (Ommatiosteres) elongata (Ricardo, 1908)]
- Pangonia flavescens Ricardo, 1900 [junior synonym of Esenbeckia (Esenbeckia) vulpes (Wiedemann, 1828)]
- Pangonia semiviridis Ricardo, 1900
- Scione claripennis Ricardo, 1900 [valid]
- Scione flavohirta Ricardo, 1902 [valid]
- Scione fulva Ricardo, 1902 [valid]
- Scione fuscus Ricardo, 1900 [accepted as Scione fusca Ricardo, 1900]
- Tabanus nigrohirtus Ricardo, 1900 [junior synonym of Tabanus conformis Walker, 1848]
- Tabanus nyasae Ricardo, 1900 [valid]

== Selected publications ==
1900: Notes on the Pangoninae of the Family Tabanidae in the British Museum Collection: The Annals and Magazine of Natural History, series 7: volume 5: issue 25, pgs 98-121 and series 7: volume 5: issue 26, pgs 167–182.

1900-1901: Notes on Diptera from South Africa (Tabanidae and Asilidae): The Annals and Magazine of Natural History, series 7: volume 6: issue 32, pgs 161-178 and series 7: volume 7: issue 37, pgs 89-110

1900: Description of Five new Species of Pangoninae from South America: The Annals and Magazine of Natural History, series 7: volume 6: issue 33, pgs 291-194

1901-1902: Further notes on the Pangoninae of the family Tabanidae in the British Museum collection: The Annals and Magazine of Natural History, Series 7: volume 8: pgs 286–315, Series 7: volume 9: pgs 366-381 and Series 7: volume 9 pgs 424–438.

1903: [with F V Theobald]: Insecta: Diptera: in The Natural History of Sokotra and Abd-el-Kuri (Special Bulletin of the Liverpool Museums), ed. Forbes, Henry O., pgs 357-379

1905: Notes on the Tabani from the Palearctic Region in the British Museum Collection: The Annals and Magazine of Natural History: Series 7: volume 16: issue 92, pgs 196-202

1906: Notes on the genus Haematopota of the family Tabanidae in the British Museum collection: The Annals and Magazine of Natural History: Series 7: volume 18: issue 104, pgs 94-127

1908: Descriptions of some new Tabanidae, with notes on some Haematopota: The Annals and Magazine of Natural History: Series 8: volume : issue 1: pgs 54-60

1908: Descriptions of thirty new species of Tabani from Africa and Madagascar: The Annals and Magazine of Natural History: Series 8: volume 1: issue 3: pgs 268-278 and Series 8: volume 1: issue 4: pgs 311-333

1909: [with J.M.R. Surcouf]: Etude monographique des Tabanides d'Afrique (Groupe des Tabanus): Paris, Masson et Cie, Éditeurs.

1909: Four new Tabanus Species from India and Assam: The Annals and Magazine of Natural History: Series 8: volume 3: issue 19: pgs 487-491

1910: A Revision of the Genus Pelecorhynchus of the Family Tabanidae: The Annals and Magazine of Natural History: Series 8: volume 5: issue 29: pgs 402-409

1911: A Revision of the Species of Tabanus from the Oriental Region, Including Notes on Species from Surrounding Countries: Records of the Indian Museum: Volume 4: pgs 111-255

1912-1914: A Revision of the Asilidae from Australasia: The Annals and Magazine of Natural History: Series 8: volume 9: issue 52: pgs 473–488, Series 8: volume 9: issue 53: pgs 585-594, Series 8: volume 10: issue 55: pgs 142–160, Series 8: volume 10: issue 57: pgs 350–360, Series 8: volume 11: issue 61: pgs 147-166

1915: Notes on the Tabanidae of the Australian Region: The Annals and Magazine of Natural History: Series 8: volume 14: issue 83: pgs 387–397, Series 8: volume 15: issue 87: pgs 270–291, Series 8: volume 16: issue 91: pgs 16-40 and Series 8: volume 16: issue 94: pgs 259-286

1917: New Species of Tabanidae from Australia and the Fiji Islands: The Annals and Magazine of Natural History: Series 8: volume 19: issue 110: pgs 207-224

1917: New Species of Haematopota from India: The Annals and Magazine of Natural History: Series 8: volume 19: issue 110: pgs 225-226

1918: Further Notes on the Asilidae of Australia: The Annals and Magazine of Natural History: Series 9: volume 1: issue 1: pgs 57-66

1919-1920: Notes on the Asilidae: Sub-division Asilinae: The Annals and Magazine of Natural History: Series 9: volume 3: pgs 44-79 and series 9: volume 5: issues 26, pgs 169-185

1921-1922: Notes on the Asilinae of the South African and Oriental regions: The Annals and Magazine of Natural History: Series 9: volume 8: issue 44, pgs 175-192 and Series 9: volume 10: issue 55, pgs 36-73

1925: New species of Asilidae from South Africa: The Annals and Magazine of Natural History: Series 9: volume 15: issue 86: pgs 234-282
