= List of Asilidae species: S =

This article lists described species of the family Asilidae start with letter S.

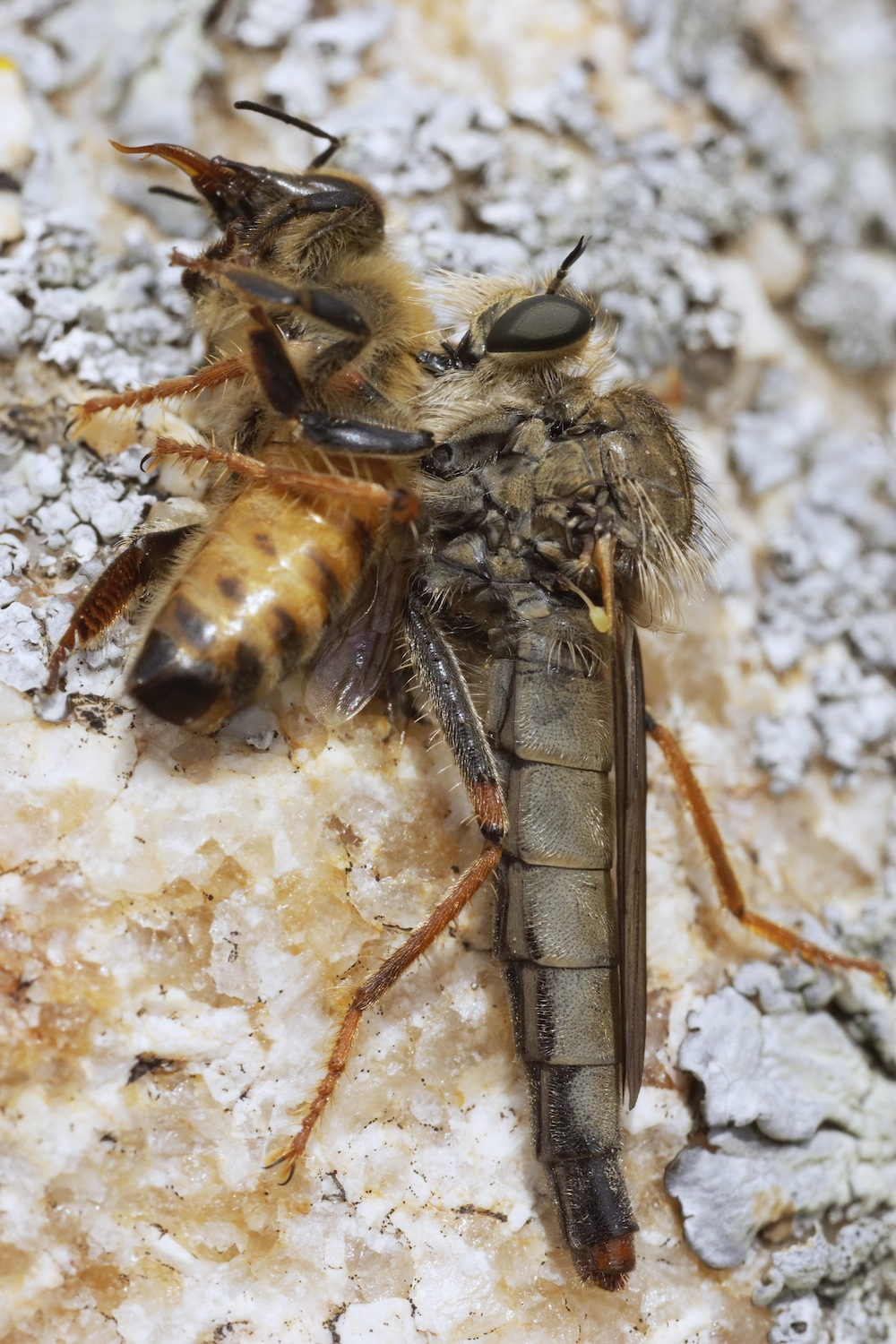
Female Stenopogon martini feeding on a honeybee

A • B • C • D • E • F • G • H • I • J • K • L • M • N • O • P • Q • R • S • T • U • V • W • Y • Z

== List of species ==
=== Genus Saropogon ===
- Saropogon aberrans (Loew, 1857)
- Saropogon albicans (Janssens, 1961)
- Saropogon albifrons (Back, 1904)
- Saropogon alternatus (Loew, 1873)
- Saropogon antipodus (Schiner, 1868)
- Saropogon aretalogus (Séguy, 1953)
- Saropogon atricolor (Loew, 1837)
- Saropogon aurifrons (Macquart, 1850)
- Saropogon axillaris (Loew, 1851)
- Saropogon beckeri (Villeneuve, 1922)
- Saropogon bijani (Abbassian-Lintzen, 1964)
- Saropogon birdi (Curran, 1931)
- Saropogon bryanti (Wilcox, 1966)
- Saropogon castaneicornis (Macquart, 1838)
- Saropogon chathamensis (Hutton, 1901)
- Saropogon clarkii (Hutton, 1901)
- Saropogon coquilletti (Back, 1909)
- Saropogon dasynotus (Loew, 1871)
- Saropogon discus (Walker, 1849)
- Saropogon dispar (Coquillett, 1902)
- Saropogon dissimulans (White, 1918)
- Saropogon distinctus (Becker, 1906)
- Saropogon dubiosus (Theodor, 1980)
- Saropogon ehrenbergii (Loew, 1851)
- Saropogon elbaiensis (Efflatoun, 1937)
- Saropogon eucerus (Loew, 1847)
- Saropogon extenuatus (Hutton, 1901)
- Saropogon flavicinctus (Wiedemann, 1820)
- Saropogon flavofacialis (Hull, 1956)
- Saropogon fletcheri (Bromley, 1934)
- Saropogon fracipes (Hutton, 1901)
- Saropogon frontalis (Loew, 1869)
- Saropogon fucatus (Loew, 1869)
- Saropogon fugiens (Hutton, 1901)
- Saropogon fulvus (Theodor, 1980)
- Saropogon galilaeus (Theodor, 1980)
- Saropogon geniculatus (Loew, 1869)
- Saropogon gigas (Becker, 1913)
- Saropogon greatheadi (Londt, 1997)
- Saropogon hudsoni (Hutton, 1901)
- Saropogon hulli (Joseph & Parui, 1997)
- Saropogon hyalinus (Coquillett, 1904)
- Saropogon hypomelas (Loew, 1866)
- Saropogon incisuratus (Wulp, 1899)
- Saropogon kenyensis (Londt, 1997)
- Saropogon lamperti (Becker, 1906)
- Saropogon laparoides (Bromley, 1951)
- Saropogon leucogenus (Séguy, 1953)
- Saropogon lhoti (Séguy, 1938)
- Saropogon limbinervis (Macquart, 1855)
- Saropogon londti (Parui, 1999)
- Saropogon longicornis (Macquart, 1838)
- Saropogon maculipennis (Brunetti, 1928)
- Saropogon maroccanus (Séguy, 1930)
- Saropogon meghalayensis (Parui, 1999)
- Saropogon megriensis (Richter, 1966)
- Saropogon melanophrus (Bigot, 1878)
- Saropogon mellipes (Bromley, 1934)
- Saropogon mofidii (Abbassian-Lintzen, 1964)
- Saropogon mohawki (Wilcox, 1966)
- Saropogon monachus (Janssens, 1960)
- Saropogon nepalensis (Parui, 1999)
- Saropogon nigritarsus (Hull, 1956)
- Saropogon nitidus (Wilcox, 1966)
- Saropogon notatus (Loew, 1869)
- Saropogon olivierii (Macquart, 1838)
- Saropogon perlatus (Costa, 1884)
- Saropogon philocalus (Séguy, 1941)
- Saropogon pittoproctus (Loew, 1873)
- Saropogon platynotus (Loew, 1847)
- Saropogon pollinosus (Loew, 1869)
- Saropogon pritchardi (Bromley, 1934)
- Saropogon proximus (Hutton, 1901)
- Saropogon pseudojugulum (Theodor, 1980)
- Saropogon pulcherrimus (Williston, 1901)
- Saropogon pulverulentus (Wulp, 1899)
- Saropogon purus (Curran, 1930)
- Saropogon revivensis (Theodor, 1980)
- Saropogon rubiventris (Wulp, 1899)
- Saropogon rubricosus (Bezzi, 1916)
- Saropogon rufipes (Gimmerthal, 1847)
- Saropogon scalaris (Bigot, 1878)
- Saropogon sculleni (Wilcox, 1966)
- Saropogon semirubra (Meijere, 1914)
- Saropogon semiustus (Coquillett, 1904)
- Saropogon solus (Bromley, 1951)
- Saropogon specularis (Bezzi, 1916)
- Saropogon srilankaensis (Joseph & Parui, 1995)
- Saropogon subauratus (Walker, 1854)
- Saropogon tassilaensis (Séguy, 1953)
- Saropogon thailandensis (Tomosovic & Grootaert, 2003)
- Saropogon tiberiadis (Theodor, 1980)
- Saropogon tigris (Parui, 1999)
- Saropogon treibensis (Theodor, 1980)
- Saropogon trispiculum (Tomosovic, 2005)
- Saropogon varians (Bigot, 1888)
- Saropogon velutinus (Carrera & Papavero, 1962)
- Saropogon verticalis (Oldroyd, 1958)
- Saropogon viduus (Walker, 1849)
- Saropogon villosus (Janssens, 1961)
- Saropogon wilcoxi (Papavero, 1971)
- Saropogon zinidi (Londt, 1997)
- Saropogon zopheropterus (Janssens, 1969)

=== Genus Satanas ===
- Satanas agha (Engel, 1934)
- Satanas fuscanipennis (Macquart, 1855)
- Satanas gigas (Eversmann, 1855)
- Satanas minor (Portschinsky, 1887)
- Satanas niveus (Macquart, 1838)
- Satanas testaceicornis (Macquart, 1855)

=== Genus Schildia ===
- Schildia alphus (Martin, 1975)
- Schildia guatemalae (Martin, 1975)
- Schildia jamaicensis (Farr, 1962)
- Schildia microthorax (Aldrich, 1923)
- Schildia ocellata (Martin, 1975)
- Schildia zonae (Martin, 1975)

=== Genus Scleropogon ===
- Scleropogon bradleyi (Bromley, 1937)
- Scleropogon cinerascens (Back, 1909)
- Scleropogon coyote (Bromley, 1931)
- Scleropogon dispar (Bromley, 1937)
- Scleropogon duncani (Bromley, 1937)
- Scleropogon floridensis (Bromley, 1951)
- Scleropogon haigi (Wilcox, 1971)
- Scleropogon helvolus (Loew, 1874)
- Scleropogon huachucanus (Hardy, 1942)
- Scleropogon indistinctus (Bromley, 1937)
- Scleropogon kelloggi (Wilcox, 1937)
- Scleropogon neglectus (Bromley, 1931)
- Scleropogon oaxacensis (Martin, 1968)
- Scleropogon petilus (Martin, 1968)
- Scleropogon similis (Jones, 1907)
- Scleropogon texanus (Bromley, 1931)

=== Genus Scylaticina ===
- Scylaticina tucumana (Artigas & Papavero, 1991)

=== Genus Scylaticodes ===
- Scylaticodes carrascoi (Artigas, 1974)
- Scylaticodes cuneigaster (Artigas, 1970)

=== Genus Scylaticus ===
- Scylaticus albofasciatus (Engel, 1932)
- Scylaticus braunsi (Londt, 1992)
- Scylaticus bromleyi (Londt, 1992)
- Scylaticus bunohippus (Londt, 1992)
- Scylaticus callimus (Londt, 1992)
- Scylaticus camptus (Londt, 1992)
- Scylaticus ceratitus (Londt, 1992)
- Scylaticus chrysotus (Londt, 1992)
- Scylaticus cruciger (Hermann, 1921)
- Scylaticus cuthbertsoni (Londt, 1992)
- Scylaticus danus (Londt, 1992)
- Scylaticus degener (Schiner, 1868)
- Scylaticus elamiensis (Abbassian-Lintzen, 1964)
- Scylaticus engeli (Bromley, 1947)
- Scylaticus entrichus (Londt, 1992)
- Scylaticus godavariensis (Joseph & Parui, 1997)
- Scylaticus gongocerus (Londt, 1992)
- Scylaticus gymnosternum (Londt, 1992)
- Scylaticus hadromedus (Londt, 1992)
- Scylaticus indicus (Bromley, 1939)
- Scylaticus iota (Londt, 1992)
- Scylaticus irwini (Londt, 1992)
- Scylaticus laevinus (Walker, 1849)
- Scylaticus loewi (Londt, 1992)
- Scylaticus lutescens (Hermann, 1914)
- Scylaticus marginatus (Engel, 1932)
- Scylaticus melanus (Londt, 1992)
- Scylaticus midas (Londt, 1992)
- Scylaticus miniatus (Becker, 1915)
- Scylaticus namibiensis (Londt, 1992)
- Scylaticus palestinensis (Theodor, 1980)
- Scylaticus pardalotus (Londt, 1992)
- Scylaticus phaeus (Londt, 1992)
- Scylaticus quadrifasciatus (Engel & Cuthbertson, 1934)
- Scylaticus ricardoae (Londt, 1992)
- Scylaticus ruficauda (Bigot, 1878)
- Scylaticus sayano (Nagatomi, 1983)
- Scylaticus semizonatus (Becker, 1906)
- Scylaticus suranganiensis (Parui & Kaur & Kapoor, 1994)
- Scylaticus thecarus (Londt, 1992)
- Scylaticus tigrinus (Londt, 1992)
- Scylaticus trophus (Londt, 1992)
- Scylaticus tyligmus (Londt, 1992)
- Scylaticus whiteheadi (Londt, 1992)
- Scylaticus zirconius (Londt, 1992)

=== Genus Scytomedes ===
- Scytomedes palaestinus (Theodor, 1980)

=== Genus Senobasis ===
- Senobasis almeidai (Carrera, 1946)
- Senobasis bromleyana (Carrera, 1949)
- Senobasis clavigeroides (Papavero, 1975)
- Senobasis corsair (Bromley, 1951)
- Senobasis flukei (Carrera, 1952)
- Senobasis frosti (Bromley, 1951)
- Senobasis lenkoi (Papavero, 1975)
- Senobasis mendax (Curran, 1934)

=== Genus Senoprosopis ===
- Senoprosopis diardii (Macquart, 1838)

=== Genus Sinopsilonyx ===
- Sinopsilonyx tibialis (Hsia, 1949)

=== Genus Sintoria ===
- Sintoria cazieri (Wilcox, 1972)
- Sintoria cyanea (Wilcox, 1972)
- Sintoria emeralda (Hull, 1962)
- Sintoria lagunae (Wilcox, 1972)
- Sintoria mojavae (Wilcox, 1972)
- Sintoria pappi (Wilcox, 1972)
- Sintoria rossi (Wilcox, 1972)

=== Genus Sisyrnodytes ===
- Sisyrnodytes apicalis (Oldroyd, 1957)
- Sisyrnodytes aterrimus (Engel, 1929)
- Sisyrnodytes brevis (Macquart, 1838)
- Sisyrnodytes curtus (Wiedemann, 1819)
- Sisyrnodytes defusus (Oldroyd, 1974)
- Sisyrnodytes diplocus (Oldroyd, 1974)
- Sisyrnodytes engeddensis (Theodor, 1980)
- Sisyrnodytes erebus (Oldroyd, 1957)
- Sisyrnodytes irwini (Oldroyd, 1974)
- Sisyrnodytes luscinius (Walker, 1849)
- Sisyrnodytes niveipilosus (Ricardo, 1925)
- Sisyrnodytes sericeus (Oldroyd, 1974)
- Sisyrnodytes subater (Oldroyd, 1957)
- Sisyrnodytes vestitus (Oldroyd, 1974)

=== Genus Smeryngolaphria ===
- Smeryngolaphria bicolorala (Tomasovic, 2003)
- Smeryngolaphria bromleyi (Londt, 1989)
- Smeryngolaphria gorayebi (Artigas & Papavero & Pimentel, 1988)
- Smeryngolaphria gurupi (Artigas & Papavero & Pimentel, 1988)
- Smeryngolaphria malanura (Wiedemann., 1828)
- Smeryngolaphria pallida (Bromley, 1935)
- Smeryngolaphria seabrai (Carrera, 1960)
- Smeryngolaphria taperignae (Artigas & Papavero & Pimentel, 1988)

=== Genus Sphagomyia ===
- Sphagomyia botswana (Londt, 2002)
- Sphagomyia kenya (Londt, 2002)

=== Genus Stackelberginia ===
- Stackelberginia gracilis (Lehr, 1964)
- Stackelberginia tsharykulievi (Lehr, 1964)

=== Genus Stenasilus ===
- Stenasilus brasiliensis (Schiner, 1867)
- Stenasilus impendens (Wiedemann, 1828)
- Stenasilus varipes (Schiner, 1867)

=== Genus Stenommatius ===
- Stenommatius formosanus (Matsumura, 1916)

=== Genus Stenopogon ===
- Stenopogon abdulrassuli (Lehr, 1984)
- Stenopogon adelantae (Wilcox, 1971)
- Stenopogon albalulus (Martin, 1968)
- Stenopogon albibasis (Bigot, 1878)
- Stenopogon albociliatus (Engel, 1929)
- Stenopogon ambryon (Walker, 1849)
- Stenopogon antoniae (Wilcox, 1971)
- Stenopogon aphrices (Walker, 1849)
- Stenopogon arnaudi (Martin, 1968)
- Stenopogon avus (Loew, 1874)
- Stenopogon bakeri (Wilcox, 1971)
- Stenopogon bartonae (Wilcox, 1971)
- Stenopogon blaisdelli (Wilcox, 1971)
- Stenopogon boharti (Bromley, 1951)
- Stenopogon breviusculoides (Bromley, 1937)
- Stenopogon breviusculus (Loew, 1872)
- Stenopogon bromleyi (Wilcox, 1971)
- Stenopogon brookmani (Wilcox, 1971)
- Stenopogon californioides (Bromley, 1937)
- Stenopogon callosus (Pallas, 1818)
- Stenopogon cazieri (Brookman, 1941)
- Stenopogon cervinus (Loew, 1861)
- Stenopogon cinchonaensis (Joseph & Parui, 1997)
- Stenopogon cinereus (Engel, 1940)
- Stenopogon colimae (Martin, 1968)
- Stenopogon coracinus (Loew, 1847)
- Stenopogon costatus (Loew, 1871)
- Stenopogon cressius (Tomasovic, 2005)
- Stenopogon damias (Walker, 1849)
- Stenopogon diablae (Wilcox, 1971)
- Stenopogon dorothyae (Martin, 1968)
- Stenopogon echelus (Walker, 1849)
- Stenopogon elizabethae (Martin, 1968)
- Stenopogon elongatissimus (Efflatoun, 1937)
- Stenopogon engelhardti (Bromley, 1937)
- Stenopogon englandi (Wilcox, 1971)
- Stenopogon felis (Bromley, 1931)
- Stenopogon festae (Bezzi, 1925)
- Stenopogon figueroae (Wilcox, 1971)
- Stenopogon flavotibialis (Martin, 1968)
- Stenopogon fulvus (Meigen, 1838)
- Stenopogon galbinus (Martin, 1968)
- Stenopogon hamus (Martin, 1968)
- Stenopogon heteroneurus (Macquart, 1838)
- Stenopogon hiemalis (Martin, 1968)
- Stenopogon hradskyi (Lehr, 1963)
- Stenopogon imbrex (Walker, 1849)
- Stenopogon inermipes (Strobl, 1909)
- Stenopogon inyae (Wilcox, 1971)
- Stenopogon iphippus (Séguy, 1932)
- Stenopogon iphis (Séguy, 1932)
- Stenopogon ischyrus (Séguy, 1932)
- Stenopogon jubatoides (Bromley, 1937)
- Stenopogon jurupae (Wilcox, 1971)
- Stenopogon kaltenbachi (Engel, 1929)
- Stenopogon kherai (Joseph & Parui, 1997)
- Stenopogon kirkwoodi (Wilcox, 1971)
- Stenopogon kocheri (Timon-David, 1951)
- Stenopogon kolenati (Gimmerthal, 1847)
- Stenopogon koreanus (Young, 2005)
- Stenopogon kozlovi (Lehr, 1963)
- Stenopogon lehri (Londt, 1999)
- Stenopogon linsleyi (Wilcox, 1971)
- Stenopogon loewi (Joseph & Parui, 1997)
- Stenopogon lomae (Wilcox, 1971)
- Stenopogon macswaini (Wilcox, 1971)
- Stenopogon manii (Joseph & Parui, 1997)
- Stenopogon manipurensisi (Joseph & Parui, 1997)
- Stenopogon marikovskii (Lehr, 1963)
- Stenopogon martini (Bromley, 1937)
- Stenopogon mediterraneus (Lehr, 1963)
- Stenopogon melanderi (Wilcox, 1971)
- Stenopogon milvus (Loew, 1847)
- Stenopogon mojavae (Wilcox, 1971)
- Stenopogon mollis (Loew, 1868)
- Stenopogon mysorensis (Joseph & Parui, 1997)
- Stenopogon nataliae (Richter, 1963)
- Stenopogon nathani (Joseph & Parui, 1997)
- Stenopogon neojubatus (Wilcox & Martin, 1945)
- Stenopogon nigritulus (Coquillett, 1904)
- Stenopogon nigriventris (Loew, 1868)
- Stenopogon nigrofasciatus (Brunetti, 1928)
- Stenopogon nigrolimbatus (Martin, 1968)
- Stenopogon obispae (Wilcox, 1971)
- Stenopogon obliteratus (Richter, 1963)
- Stenopogon occlusus (Theodor, 1980)
- Stenopogon ochraceus (Wulp, 1870)
- Stenopogon ochripes (Loew, 1861)
- Stenopogon oldroydi (Joseph & Parui, 1997)
- Stenopogon ortegai (Martin, 1968)
- Stenopogon ozenae (Wilcox, 1971)
- Stenopogon peregrinus (Séguy, 1932)
- Stenopogon piceus (von Roeder, 1883)
- Stenopogon pinyonae (Wilcox, 1971)
- Stenopogon porcus (Loew, 1871)
- Stenopogon povolnyi (Hradský, 1985)
- Stenopogon powelli (Wilcox, 1971)
- Stenopogon pradhani (Joseph & Parui, 1976)
- Stenopogon propinquus (Bromley, 1937)
- Stenopogon pseudosabaudus (Lehr, 1963)
- Stenopogon pulverifer (Walker, 1851)
- Stenopogon rafaelae (Wilcox, 1971)
- Stenopogon raven (Bromley, 1938)
- Stenopogon roederii (Bezzi, 1895)
- Stenopogon roonwali (Joseph & Parui, 1997)
- Stenopogon rossi (Martin, 1968)
- Stenopogon rufescens (Theodor, 1980)
- Stenopogon rufibarbis (Bromley, 1931)
- Stenopogon rufibarboides (Bromley, 1937)
- Stenopogon rufipilus (Loew, 1873)
- Stenopogon schisticolor (Gerstaecker, 1862)
- Stenopogon setosus (Bezark, 1984)
- Stenopogon silaceus (Martin, 1968)
- Stenopogon solsolacearum (Lehr, 1963)
- Stenopogon stackelbergi (Lehr, 1963)
- Stenopogon stonei (Bromley, 1937)
- Stenopogon subtus (Bromley, 1935)
- Stenopogon surrufus (Martin, 1968)
- Stenopogon taboarde (Strobl, 1909)
- Stenopogon tolandi (Wilcox, 1971)
- Stenopogon tristis (Meigen, 1820)
- Stenopogon truquii (Bellardi, 1861)
- Stenopogon utahensis (Bromley, 1951)
- Stenopogon variabilis (Lehr, 1963)
- Stenopogon werneri (Engel, 1933)
- Stenopogon wilcoxi (Bromley, 1937)
- Stenopogon williamsi (Wilcox, 1971)
- Stenopogon xochimilcae (Martin, 1968)
- Stenopogon zebra (Martin, 1968)
- Stenopogon zimini (Lehr, 1963)
- Stenopogon zinovievi (Lehr, 1963)

=== Genus Stichopogon ===
- Stichopogon abdominalis (Back, 1909)
- Stichopogon aequetinctus (Becker, 1910)
- Stichopogon albellus (Loew, 1856)
- Stichopogon albimystax (Joseph & Parui, 1997)
- Stichopogon ammophilus (Lehr, 1975)
- Stichopogon angustifrons (Theodor, 1980)
- Stichopogon araxicola (Richter, 1979)
- Stichopogon arenicola (Wilcox, 1936)
- Stichopogon argenteus (Say, 1823)
- Stichopogon auctus (Bezzi, 1912)
- Stichopogon aurigerum (Lehr, 1984)
- Stichopogon auritinctus (Abbassian-Lintzen, 1964)
- Stichopogon bancrofti (Hardy, 1934)
- Stichopogon barbiellinii (Bezzi, 1910)
- Stichopogon barbistrellus (Loew, 1854)
- Stichopogon basiti (Joseph & Parui, 1997)
- Stichopogon bedae (Hradský & Geller-Grimm, 1996)
- Stichopogon bengalensis (Joseph & Parui, 1997)
- Stichopogon biharilali (Joseph & Parui, 1997)
- Stichopogon callidus (Richter, 1966)
- Stichopogon canariensis (Becker, 1908)
- Stichopogon canus (Séguy, 1932)
- Stichopogon caucasicus (Bezzi, 1910)
- Stichopogon colei (Bromley, 1934)
- Stichopogon coquilletti (Bezzi, 1910)
- Stichopogon deserti (Theodor, 1980)
- Stichopogon dorsatus (Becker, 1915)
- Stichopogon dubiosus (Villeneuve, 1920)
- Stichopogon eluruensis (Joseph & Parui, 1997)
- Stichopogon fragilis (Back, 1909)
- Stichopogon gracilifemur (Nagatomi, 1983)
- Stichopogon gussakovskii (Lehr, 1975)
- Stichopogon gymnurus (Oldroyd, 1948)
- Stichopogon inaequalis (Loew, 1847)
- Stichopogon inconstans (Wiedemann, 1828)
- Stichopogon indicus (Joseph & Parui, 1997)
- Stichopogon infuscatus (Bezzi, 1910)
- Stichopogon irwini (Londt, 1979)
- Stichopogon kerteszi (Bezzi, 1910)
- Stichopogon kerzhneri (Lehr, 1975)
- Stichopogon mahatoi (Joseph & Parui, 1997)
- Stichopogon marinus (Efflatoun, 1937)
- Stichopogon maritima (Hardy, 1934)
- Stichopogon menoni (Joseph & Parui, 1997)
- Stichopogon meridionalis (Oldroyd, 1948)
- Stichopogon minor (Hardy, 1934)
- Stichopogon mitjaevi (Lehr, 1975)
- Stichopogon modestus (Lehr, 1975)
- Stichopogon molkovskii (Lehr, 1964)
- Stichopogon moremiensis (Londt, 1979)
- Stichopogon mukherjeei (Joseph & Parui, 1997)
- Stichopogon muticus (Bezzi, 1910)
- Stichopogon nartshukae (Lehr, 1975)
- Stichopogon nigritus (Paramonov, 1930)
- Stichopogon obscurus (Hardy, 1928)
- Stichopogon ocrealis (Rondani, 1863)
- Stichopogon oldroydi (Joseph & Parui, 1997)
- Stichopogon parvipulvillatus (Lehr, 1975)
- Stichopogon peregrinus (Osten-Sacken, 1882)
- Stichopogon pholipteron (Richter, 1973)
- Stichopogon pritchardi (Bromley, 1951)
- Stichopogon punctiferus (Bigot, 1878)
- Stichopogon ramakrishnai (Joseph & Parui, 1997)
- Stichopogon rivulorum (Lehr, 1975)
- Stichopogon rubzovi (Lehr, 1975)
- Stichopogon salinus (Melander, 1924)
- Stichopogon schnusei (Bezzi, 1910)
- Stichopogon selenginus (Lehr, 1984)
- Stichopogon septemcinctus (Becker, 1908)
- Stichopogon sogdianus (Lehr, 1975)
- Stichopogon stackelbergi (Lehr, 1975)
- Stichopogon surcoufi (Villeneuve, 1920)
- Stichopogon tomentosus (Oldroyd, 1948)
- Stichopogon tridactylophagus (Lehr, 1975)
- Stichopogon umkomaasensis (Oldroyd, 1974)
- Stichopogon unicolor (Ricardo, 1925)
- Stichopogon venustus (Richter, 1963)
- Stichopogon vernaculus (White, 1918)
- Stichopogon villiersi (Séguy, 1955)

=== Genus Stilpnogaster ===
- Stilpnogaster argonautica (Janssens, 1955)
- Stilpnogaster stabilis (Zeller, 1840)

=== Genus Stiphrolamyra ===
- Stiphrolamyra albibarbis (Engel, 1928)
- Stiphrolamyra annae (Londt, 1983)
- Stiphrolamyra apicalis (Curran, 1927)
- Stiphrolamyra bipunctata (Loew, 1858)
- Stiphrolamyra comans (Hobby, 1939)
- Stiphrolamyra diaxantha (Hermann, 1907)
- Stiphrolamyra hermanni (Londt, 1983)
- Stiphrolamyra rubicunda (Oldroyd, 1947)
- Stiphrolamyra schoemani (Londt, 1983)
- Stiphrolamyra sinaitica (Theodor, 1980)
- Stiphrolamyra vincenti (Londt, 1983)
- Stiphrolamyra vitai (Hradský & Geller-Grimm, 1997)

=== Genus Stizochymus ===
- Stizochymus salinator (Walker, 1849)

=== Genus Stizolestes ===
- Stizolestes atribarbis (Artigas, 1970)
- Stizolestes aureomaculatus (Bromley, 1932)
- Stizolestes mayi (Edwards, 1932)
- Stizolestes modellus (Bromley, 1932)
- Stizolestes nigriventris (Philippi, 1865)
- Stizolestes pamponeroides (Edwards, 1932)

=== Genus Storthyngomerus ===
- Storthyngomerus minor (Lindner, 1955)
- Storthyngomerus potanodrilus (Londt, 1998)
- Storthyngomerus toroensis (Oldroyd, 1970)

=== Genus Strombocodia ===
- Strombocodia elegans (Hermann, 1912)

=== Genus Strophipogon ===
- Strophipogon bromleyi (Hull, 1958)

=== Genus Synolcus ===
- Synolcus acrobaptus (Wiedemann, 1828)
- Synolcus amnoni (Londt, 1990)
- Synolcus argentius (Londt, 1990)
- Synolcus griseus (Engel, 1927)
- Synolcus incisuralis (Macquart, 1838)
- Synolcus malawi (Londt, 1990)
- Synolcus minor (Bromley, 1947)
- Synolcus spinosus (Londt, 1980)

=== Genus Systellogaster ===
- Systellogaster alba (Martin, 1975)
- Systellogaster breviventris (Rondani, 1848)
- Systellogaster fascipennis (Schiner, 1867)
- Systellogaster parva (Martin, 1975)

=== Genus Systropalpus ===
- Systropalpus aurivulpes (Hull, 1962)
