= List of Saropogon species =

This is a list of 126 species in Saropogon, a genus of robber flies in the family Asilidae.

== Saropogon species ==
- Saropogon abbreviatus Johnson, 1903^{i g b}
- Saropogon aberrans Loew, 1857^{c g}
- Saropogon albicans Janssens, 1961^{c g}
- Saropogon albifrons Back, 1904^{i c g}
- Saropogon alternatus Loew, 1873^{c g}
- Saropogon antipodus Schiner, 1868^{c g}
- Saropogon aretalogus Seguy, 1953^{c g}
- Saropogon atricolor Loew, 1857^{c g}
- Saropogon aurifrons (Macquart, 1849)^{c g}
- Saropogon axillaris Loew, 1851^{c g}
- Saropogon beckeri Villeneuve, 1922^{c g}
- Saropogon bijani Abbassian-Lintzen, 1964^{c g}
- Saropogon birdi Curran, 1931^{i c g}
- Saropogon bryanti Wilcox, 1966^{i c g b}
- Saropogon castaneicornis (Macquart, 1838)^{c g}
- Saropogon celaenopterus Janssens, 1968^{c g}
- Saropogon chathamensis Hutton, 1901^{c g}
- Saropogon clarkii Hutton, 1901^{c g}
- Saropogon clausus Becker, 1906^{c g}
- Saropogon combustus Loew, 1874^{i c g}
- Saropogon comosus Loew, 1869^{c g}
- Saropogon coquilletti Back, 1909^{c g b}
- Saropogon coquillettii Back, 1909^{i}
- Saropogon dasynotus Loew, 1871^{c g}
- Saropogon discus (Walker, 1849)^{c g}
- Saropogon dispar Coquillett, 1902^{i c g b}
- Saropogon dissimulans White, 1918^{c g}
- Saropogon distinctus Becker, 1906^{c g}
- Saropogon dubiosus Theodor, 1980^{c g}
- Saropogon ehrenbergii Loew, 1851^{c g}
- Saropogon elbaiensis Efflatoun, 1937^{c g}
- Saropogon eucerus (Loew, 1847)^{c g}
- Saropogon extenuatus Hutton, 1901^{c g}
- Saropogon fascipes Hutton, 1902^{c g}
- Saropogon flavicinctus (Wiedemann, 1820)^{c g}
- Saropogon flavofacialis Hull, 1956^{c g}
- Saropogon fletcheri Bromley, 1934^{i c g}
- Saropogon frontalis Loew, 1869^{c g}
- Saropogon fucatus Loew, 1869^{c g}
- Saropogon fugiens Hutton, 1901^{c g}
- Saropogon fulvicornis (Macquart, 1850)^{c}
- Saropogon fulvus Theodor, 1980^{c g}
- Saropogon galilaeus Theodor, 1980^{c g}
- Saropogon geniculatus Loew, 1869^{c g}
- Saropogon gigas Becker & Stein, 1913^{c g}
- Saropogon greatheadi Londt, 1997^{c g}
- Saropogon hispanicus Strobl, 1906^{c g}
- Saropogon hudsoni Hutton, 1901^{c g}
- Saropogon hulli Joseph & Parui, 1981^{c g}
- Saropogon hyalinus Coquillett, 1904^{i c g}
- Saropogon hypomelas (Loew, 1866)^{i c g b}
- Saropogon incisuratus Wulp, 1899^{c g}
- Saropogon jucundus (Wulp, 1872)^{c g}
- Saropogon jugulum (Loew, 1847)^{c g}
- Saropogon kenyensis Londt, 1997^{c g}
- Saropogon lamperti Becker, 1906^{c g}
- Saropogon laparoides Bromley, 1951^{i c g}
- Saropogon latecinctus Becker, 1906^{c g}
- Saropogon leucocephalus (Meigen, 1820)^{c g}
- Saropogon leucogenus Seguy, 1953^{c g}
- Saropogon lhoti Seguy, 1938^{c g}
- Saropogon limbinevris (Macquart, 1855)^{c g}
- Saropogon londti Parui, 1999^{c g}
- Saropogon longicornis (Macquart, 1838)^{c g}
- Saropogon luctuosus (Wiedemann, 1820)^{c g}
- Saropogon luteus Coquillett, 1904^{i c g b}
- Saropogon maculipennis (Brunetti, 1928)^{c g}
- Saropogon maroccanus Seguy, 1930^{c g}
- Saropogon meghalayensis Parui, 1999^{c g}
- Saropogon megriensis Richter, 1966^{c g}
- Saropogon melampygus (Loew, 1851)^{c g}
- Saropogon melanophrus Bigot, 1878^{c g}
- Saropogon mellipes Bromley, 1934^{c g}
- Saropogon mofidii Abbassian-Lintzen, 1964^{c g}
- Saropogon mohawki Wilcox, 1966^{i c g b}
- Saropogon monachus Janssens, 1960^{c g}
- Saropogon nepalensis Parui, 1999^{c g}
- Saropogon nigritarsus Hull, 1956^{c g}
- Saropogon nigriventris Frey, 1958^{c g}
- Saropogon nigronasutum Bigot, 1878^{c g}
- Saropogon nitidus Wilcox, 1966^{i c g b}
- Saropogon notatus Loew, 1869^{c g}
- Saropogon obesulus Loew, 1869^{c g}
- Saropogon obscuripennis (Macquart, 1849)^{c g}
- Saropogon olivierii (Macquart, 1838)^{c}
- Saropogon perlatus Costa, 1884^{c g}
- Saropogon philocalus Seguy, 1941^{c g}
- Saropogon pittoproctus Loew, 1873^{c g}
- Saropogon platynotus (Loew, 1847)^{c g}
- Saropogon pollinosus Loew, 1869^{c g}
- Saropogon pritchardi Bromley, 1934^{i c g b}
- Saropogon proximus Hutton, 1901^{c g}
- Saropogon pseudojugulum Theodor, 1980^{c g}
- Saropogon pulcherimus Williston, 1901^{c g}
- Saropogon pulverulentus Wulp, 1899^{c g}
- Saropogon punctipennis Frey, 1958^{c g}
- Saropogon purus Curran, 1930^{i c g b}
- Saropogon revivensis Theodor, 1980^{c g}
- Saropogon rubricosus Bezzi, 1916^{c g}
- Saropogon rubriventris Wulp, 1899^{c g}
- Saropogon rufipes (Gimmerthal, 1847)^{c g}
- Saropogon scalaris Bigot, 1878^{c g}
- Saropogon semirubra Meijere, 1914^{c g}
- Saropogon semiustus Coquillett, 1904^{i c g}
- Saropogon senex Osten Sacken, 1887^{i c g}
- Saropogon sodalis Loew, 1869^{c g}
- Saropogon solus Bromley, 1951^{i c g}
- Saropogon specularis Bezzi, 1916^{c g}
- Saropogon srilankaensis Joseph & Parui, 1995^{c g}
- Saropogon subauratus (Walker, 1854)^{c g}
- Saropogon tassilaensis Seguy, 1953^{c g}
- Saropogon thailandensis Tomasovic & Grootaert, 2003^{c g}
- Saropogon tiberiadis Theodor, 1980^{c g}
- Saropogon ticinense Bezzi, 1892^{c g}
- Saropogon tigris Parui, 1999^{c g}
- Saropogon treibensis Theodor, 1980^{c g}
- Saropogon trispiculum Tomasovic, 2005^{c g}
- Saropogon varians Bigot, 1888^{c g}
- Saropogon velutinus Carrera & Papavero, 1962^{c g}
- Saropogon verticalis Oldroyd, 1958^{c g}
- Saropogon vestitus (Wiedemann, 1828)^{c g}
- Saropogon viduus (Walker, 1849)^{c g}
- Saropogon weissi Bezzi, 1910^{c g}
- Saropogon wilcoxi Papavero, 1971^{c g}
- Saropogon zinidi Londt, 1997^{c g}
- Saropogon zopheropterus Janssens, 1969^{c g}

Data sources: i = ITIS, c = Catalogue of Life, g = GBIF, b = Bugguide.net
