= List of Stenopogon species =

This is a list of 206 species in Stenopogon, a genus of robber flies in the family Asilidae.

== Stenopogon species ==
- Stenopogon abdulrassuli Lehr, 1984^{c g}
- Stenopogon adelantae Wilcox, 1971^{i c g}
- Stenopogon aeacidinus Williston, 1886^{c g}
- Stenopogon aeacus (Wiedemann, 1828)^{c g}
- Stenopogon alamoensis (Martin, 1968)^{c g}
- Stenopogon albalulus Martin, 1968^{c g}
- Stenopogon albibasis Bigot, 1878^{i c g}
- Stenopogon albociliatus Hermann, 1929^{c g}
- Stenopogon ambryon (Walker, 1849)^{c g}
- Stenopogon antigenes (Walker, 1849)^{c g}
- Stenopogon antoniae Wilcox, 1971^{i c g}
- Stenopogon aphrices (Walker, 1849)^{c g}
- Stenopogon arabicus (Macquart, 1838)^{c}
- Stenopogon arizonensis Bromley, 1937^{c g}
- Stenopogon armatus Oldroyd, 1974^{c g}
- Stenopogon arnaudi Martin, 1968^{c g}
- Stenopogon atrox Oldroyd, 1974^{c g}
- Stenopogon avus (Loew, 1874)^{c g}
- Stenopogon bakeri Wilcox, 1971^{i c g}
- Stenopogon bartonae Wilcox, 1971^{i c g}
- Stenopogon blaisdelli Wilcox, 1971^{i c g}
- Stenopogon boharti Bromley, 1951^{i c g}
- Stenopogon braunsi Oldroyd, 1974^{c g}
- Stenopogon brevipennis (Wiedemann, 1820)^{c}
- Stenopogon brevis Martin, 1968^{c g}
- Stenopogon breviusculoides Bromley, 1937^{i c g b}
- Stenopogon breviusculus Loew, 1872^{i c g b}
- Stenopogon bromleyi Wilcox, 1971^{i c g}
- Stenopogon brookmani Wilcox, 1971^{i c g}
- Stenopogon californiae (Walker, 1849)^{i c g b}
- Stenopogon californioides Bromley, 1937^{i c g}
- Stenopogon callosus (Pallas, 1818)^{c g}
- Stenopogon carbonarius Hermann, 1929^{c g}
- Stenopogon cazieri Brookman, 1941^{i c g b}
- Stenopogon cervinus Loew, 1861^{c g}
- Stenopogon cinchonaensis Joseph & Parui, 1981^{c g}
- Stenopogon cinereus Engel, 1940^{c g}
- Stenopogon colimae Martin, 1968^{c g}
- Stenopogon confrontus Oldroyd, 1974^{c g}
- Stenopogon coracinus (Loew, 1847)^{c g}
- Stenopogon costatus Loew, 1871^{c g}
- Stenopogon cressius Tomasovic, 2005^{c g}
- Stenopogon csikii Strobl, 1901^{c g}
- Stenopogon damias (Walker, 1849)^{c g}
- Stenopogon diablae Wilcox, 1971^{i c g}
- Stenopogon dilutus (Walker, 1851)^{c g}
- Stenopogon diversus (Williston, 1901)^{c g}
- Stenopogon dorothyae Martin, 1968^{c g}
- Stenopogon duncani Bromley, 1937^{c g}
- Stenopogon ebyi Bromley, 1937^{c g}
- Stenopogon echelus (Walker, 1849)^{c g}
- Stenopogon elizabethae Martin, 1968^{c g}
- Stenopogon elongatissimus Efflatoun, 1937^{c g}
- Stenopogon elongatus (Meigen, 1804)^{c g}
- Stenopogon engelhardti Bromley, 1937^{i c g b}
- Stenopogon englandi Wilcox, 1971^{i c g}
- Stenopogon escalarae Strobl, 1906^{c g}
- Stenopogon escorialensis Strobl, 1906^{c g}
- Stenopogon evansi (Martin, 1968)^{c g}
- Stenopogon felis Bromley, 1931^{i c g}
- Stenopogon festae Bezzi, 1925^{c g}
- Stenopogon figueroae Wilcox, 1971^{i c g}
- Stenopogon flavibarbis Enderlein, 1934^{c g}
- Stenopogon flavotibialis Martin, 1968^{c g}
- Stenopogon fulvus (Meigen, 1838)^{c g}
- Stenopogon fuscolimbatus Bigot, 1878^{c g}
- Stenopogon galadae Martin, 1968^{c g}
- Stenopogon galbinus Martin, 1968^{c g}
- Stenopogon gracilis (Macquart, 1838)^{c}
- Stenopogon gratus Loew, 1872^{i c g}
- Stenopogon gruenbergi Becker, 1911^{c g}
- Stenopogon hamus Martin, 1968^{c g}
- Stenopogon harpax Loew, 1868^{c g}
- Stenopogon heteroneurus (Macquart, 1838)^{c}
- Stenopogon hiemalis Martin, 1968^{c g}
- Stenopogon hradskyi Lehr, 1963^{c g}
- Stenopogon imbrex (Walker, 1849)^{c g}
- Stenopogon indistinctus Bromley, 1937^{c g}
- Stenopogon inermipes Strobl, 1909^{c g}
- Stenopogon inquinatus Loew, 1866^{i c g b}
- Stenopogon inyae Wilcox, 1971^{i c g}
- Stenopogon iphippus Seguy, 1932^{c g}
- Stenopogon iphis Seguy, 1932^{c g}
- Stenopogon ischyrus Seguy, 1932^{c g}
- Stenopogon jubatoides Bromley, 1937^{i c g}
- Stenopogon jubatus (Coquillett, 1904)^{i c g}
- Stenopogon junceus (Wiedemann, 1820)^{c g}
- Stenopogon jurupae Wilcox, 1971^{i c g}
- Stenopogon kaltenbachi Engel, 1929^{c g}
- Stenopogon kherai Joseph & Parui, 1976^{c g}
- Stenopogon kirkwoodi Wilcox, 1971^{i c g}
- Stenopogon kocheri Timon-David, 1951^{c g}
- Stenopogon kolenati (Gimmerthal, 1847)^{c g}
- Stenopogon koreanus Young, 2005^{c g}
- Stenopogon kozlovi Lehr, 1963^{c g}
- Stenopogon laevigatus (Loew, 1851)^{c g}
- Stenopogon languidus Hradsky, 1962^{c g}
- Stenopogon latipennis Loew, 1866^{c g}
- Stenopogon lehri Londt, 1999^{c g}
- Stenopogon linsleyi Wilcox, 1971^{i c g}
- Stenopogon loewi Joseph & Parui, 1984^{c g}
- Stenopogon lomae Wilcox, 1971^{i c g b}
- Stenopogon longulus Loew, 1866^{c g}
- Stenopogon lugubris (Williston, 1901)^{c g}
- Stenopogon macilentus Loew, 1861^{c g}
- Stenopogon macswaini Wilcox, 1971^{i c g}
- Stenopogon manii Joseph & Parui, 1981^{c g}
- Stenopogon manipurensis Joseph & Parui, 1976^{c g}
- Stenopogon marikovskii Lehr, 1963^{c g}
- Stenopogon martini Bromley, 1937^{i c g}
- Stenopogon mediterraneus Lehr, 1963^{c g}
- Stenopogon melanderi Wilcox, 1971^{i c g}
- Stenopogon melanostolus Loew, 1868^{c g}
- Stenopogon milvoides Engel, 1929^{c g}
- Stenopogon milvus (Loew, 1847)^{c g}
- Stenopogon minos (Osten Sacken, 1887)^{c g}
- Stenopogon mojavae Wilcox, 1971^{i c g}
- Stenopogon mollis Loew, 1868^{c g}
- Stenopogon mongolicus Lehr, 1963^{c g}
- Stenopogon mydon Engel, 1930^{c g}
- Stenopogon mysorensis Joseph & Parui, 1981^{c g}
- Stenopogon nataliae Richter, 1963^{c g}
- Stenopogon nathani Joseph & Parui, 1976^{c g}
- Stenopogon neojubatus Wilcox and Martin, 1945^{i c g}
- Stenopogon nigripes Engel, 1940^{c g}
- Stenopogon nigritulus Coquillett, 1904^{i c g}
- Stenopogon nigriventris Loew, 1868^{c g}
- Stenopogon nigrofasciatus Brunetti, 1928^{c g}
- Stenopogon nigrolimbatus Martin, 1968^{c g}
- Stenopogon nitens Coquillett, 1904^{c g}
- Stenopogon oaxacensis Martin, 1968^{c g}
- Stenopogon obispae Wilcox, 1971^{i c g b}
- Stenopogon obliteratus Richter, 1963^{c g}
- Stenopogon obscuriventris Loew, 1872^{i c g}
- Stenopogon occidentalis Lehr, 1963^{c g}
- Stenopogon occlusus Theodor, 1980^{c g}
- Stenopogon ochraceus (Wulp, 1870)^{c g}
- Stenopogon ochripes Loew, 1861^{c g}
- Stenopogon oldroydi Joseph & Parui, 1976^{c g}
- Stenopogon orientalis Lehr, 1963^{c g}
- Stenopogon ortegai Martin, 1968^{c g}
- Stenopogon ozenae Wilcox, 1971^{i c g}
- Stenopogon painterorum (Martin, 1968)^{c g}
- Stenopogon parksi Bromley, 1934^{c g}
- Stenopogon peregrinus Seguy, 1932^{c g}
- Stenopogon petilus Martin, 1968^{c g}
- Stenopogon piceus (von Roder, 1893)^{c g}
- Stenopogon pinyonae Wilcox, 1971^{i c g}
- Stenopogon porcus Loew, 1871^{c g}
- Stenopogon povolnyi Hradsky, 1985^{c g}
- Stenopogon powelli Wilcox, 1971^{i c g}
- Stenopogon pradhani Joseph & Parui, 1976^{c g}
- Stenopogon propinquus Bromley, 1937^{i c g}
- Stenopogon pseudosabaudus Lehr, 1963^{c g}
- Stenopogon pulverifer (Walker, 1851)^{c g}
- Stenopogon pumilus Coquillett, 1904^{c g}
- Stenopogon pyrrhomus (Wiedemann, 1818)^{c g}
- Stenopogon pyrrhus Loew, 1871^{c g}
- Stenopogon rafaelae Wilcox, 1971^{i c g}
- Stenopogon raven (Bromley, 1938)^{c g}
- Stenopogon rhadamanthus Loew, 1866^{c g}
- Stenopogon rionegrensis Lamas, 1971^{c g}
- Stenopogon roederii Bezzi, 1895^{c g}
- Stenopogon roonwali Joseph & Parui, 1993^{c g}
- Stenopogon rossi Martin, 1968^{c g}
- Stenopogon rufescens Theodor, 1980^{c g}
- Stenopogon rufibarbis Bromley, 1931^{i c g b}
- Stenopogon rufibarboides Bromley, 1937^{i c g}
- Stenopogon ruficauda Engel, 1929^{c g}
- Stenopogon sabaudus (Fabricius, 1794)^{c g}
- Stenopogon schisticolor Gerstaecker, 1861^{c g}
- Stenopogon sciron (Loew, 1873)^{c g}
- Stenopogon setosus Bezark, 1984^{c g}
- Stenopogon silaceus Martin, 1968^{c g}
- Stenopogon sinaloensis (Martin, 1968)^{c g}
- Stenopogon solsolacearum Lehr, 1963^{c g}
- Stenopogon stackelbergi Lehr, 1963^{c g}
- Stenopogon stonei Bromley, 1937^{c g}
- Stenopogon strataegus Gerstaecker, 1861^{c g}
- Stenopogon subtus (Bromley, 1935)^{c g}
- Stenopogon superbus (Portschinsky, 1873)^{c g}
- Stenopogon surufus Martin, 1968^{c g}
- Stenopogon taboarde Strobl, 1909^{c g}
- Stenopogon tenebrosus Coquillett, 1904^{c g}
- Stenopogon tequilae (Martin, 1968)^{c g}
- Stenopogon texanus Bromley, 1931^{c g}
- Stenopogon theodori Lehr, 1984^{c g}
- Stenopogon tolandi Wilcox, 1971^{i c g}
- Stenopogon tristis (Meigen, 1820)^{c g}
- Stenopogon trivialis Oldroyd, 1974^{c g}
- Stenopogon truquii (Bellardi, 1861)^{c g}
- Stenopogon utahensis Bromley, 1951^{i c g}
- Stenopogon vallensis Martin, 1968^{c g}
- Stenopogon variabilis Theodor, 1980^{c g}
- Stenopogon villus Martin, 1968^{c g}
- Stenopogon werneri Engel, 1933^{c g}
- Stenopogon wilcoxi Bromley, 1937^{i c g}
- Stenopogon williamsi Wilcox, 1971^{i c g}
- Stenopogon wolfi Mik, 1887^{c g}
- Stenopogon xanthomelas Loew, 1868^{c g}
- Stenopogon xanthotrichus (Brulle, 1833)^{c g}
- Stenopogon xochimilcae Martin, 1968^{c g}
- Stenopogon youngi (Martin, 1968)^{c g}
- Stenopogon zebra Martin, 1968^{c g}
- Stenopogon zimini Lehr, 1963^{c g}
- Stenopogon zinovievi Lehr, 1963^{c g}

Data sources: i = ITIS, c = Catalogue of Life, g = GBIF, b = Bugguide.net
