= List of Stichopogon species =

This is a list of 105 species in Stichopogon, a genus of robber flies in the family Asilidae.

== Stichopogon species ==
- Stichopogon abdominalis Back, 1909^{i c g b}
- Stichopogon aedon (Walker, 1849)^{c g}
- Stichopogon aequetinctus Becker, 1910^{c g}
- Stichopogon agustifrons Theodor, 1980^{c g}
- Stichopogon albellus Loew, 1856^{c g}
- Stichopogon albimystax Joseph & Parui, 1988^{c g}
- Stichopogon albofasciatus (Meigen, 1820)^{c g}
- Stichopogon ammophilus Lehr, 1975^{c g}
- Stichopogon angustifrons Theodor, 1980^{c g}
- Stichopogon araxicola Richter, 1979^{c g}
- Stichopogon arenicolus Wilcox, 1936^{i c g}
- Stichopogon argenteus (Say, 1823)^{i c g b}
- Stichopogon auctus Bezzi, 1912^{c g}
- Stichopogon aurigerum Lehr, 1984^{c g}
- Stichopogon auritinctus Abbassian-Lintzen, 1964^{c g}
- Stichopogon bancrofti Hardy, 1934^{c g}
- Stichopogon barbiellinii Bezzi, 1910^{c g}
- Stichopogon barbistrellus Loew, 1854^{c g}
- Stichopogon basiti Joseph & Parui, 1993^{c g}
- Stichopogon beckeri Bezzi, 1910^{c g}
- Stichopogon bedae Hradsky & Geller-Grimm, 1996^{c g}
- Stichopogon biharilali Joseph & Parui, 1993^{c g}
- Stichopogon caffer Hermann, 1907^{c g}
- Stichopogon californica Barnes, 2013
- Stichopogon callidus Richter, 1966^{c g}
- Stichopogon canariensis Becker, 1908^{c g}
- Stichopogon candidus Becker, 1902^{c g}
- Stichopogon canus Seguy, 1932^{c g}
- Stichopogon catulus Osten Sacken, 1887^{i c g b}
- Stichopogon caucasicus Bezzi, 1910^{c g}
- Stichopogon chrysostoma Schiner, 1867^{c g}
- Stichopogon colei Bromley, 1934^{i c g b}
- Stichopogon conjungens Bezzi, 1910^{c g}
- Stichopogon coquillettii (Bezzi, 1910)^{i c g}
- Stichopogon deserti Theodor, 1980^{c g}
- Stichopogon dorsatus Becker, 1915^{c g}
- Stichopogon dubiosus Villeneuve, 1920^{c g}
- Stichopogon elegantulus (Wiedemann, 1820)^{c g}
- Stichopogon engeli Lindner, 1973^{c g}
- Stichopogon flaviventris Efflatoun, 1937^{c g}
- Stichopogon fragilis Back, 1909^{i c g b}
- Stichopogon gracilifemur Nagatomi, 1983^{c g}
- Stichopogon gussakovskii Lehr, 1975^{c g}
- Stichopogon gymnurus Oldroyd, 1948^{c g}
- Stichopogon hermanni Bezzi, 1910^{c g}
- Stichopogon inaequalis (Loew, 1847)^{c g}
- Stichopogon inconstana (Wiedemann, 1828)^{c g}
- Stichopogon indicus Joseph & Parui, 1984^{c g}
- Stichopogon infuscatus Bezzi, 1910^{c g}
- Stichopogon irwini Londt, 1979^{c g}
- Stichopogon kerteszi Bezzi, 1910^{c g}
- Stichopogon kerzhmeri Lehr, 1975^{c g}
- Stichopogon krueperi Bezzi, 1910^{c g}
- Stichopogon maculipennis Engel & Cuthbertson, 1939^{c g}
- Stichopogon mahatoi Joseph & Parui, 1999^{c g}
- Stichopogon malkovskii (Lehr, 1964)^{c}
- Stichopogon marinus Efflatoun, 1937^{c g}
- Stichopogon maritima (Hardy, 1934)^{c g}
- Stichopogon maroccanus (Becker, 1913)^{c g}
- Stichopogon meridionalis Oldroyd, 1948^{c g}
- Stichopogon minor Hardy, 1934^{c g}
- Stichopogon mitjaevi Lehr, 1975^{c g}
- Stichopogon modestus Lehr, 1975^{c g}
- Stichopogon moremiensis Londt, 1979^{c g}
- Stichopogon mukherjeei Joseph & Parui, 1999^{c g}
- Stichopogon muticus Bezzi, 1910^{c g}
- Stichopogon nartshuakae Lehr, 1975^{c g}
- Stichopogon nartshukae Lehr^{g}
- Stichopogon nigritus (Paramonov, 1930)^{c g}
- Stichopogon obscurellus Lehr, 1975^{c g}
- Stichopogon obscurus (Hardy, 1928)^{c g}
- Stichopogon ocrealis (Rondani, 1863)^{c g}
- Stichopogon oldroydi Joseph & Parui, 1993^{c g}
- Stichopogon orientalis Lehr, 1975^{c g}
- Stichopogon parvipulvillatus Lehr, 1975^{c g}
- Stichopogon parvulus (Bigot, 1859)^{c}
- Stichopogon peregrinus Osten Sacken, 1882^{c g}
- Stichopogon pholipteron Richter, 1973^{c g}
- Stichopogon pritchardi Bromley, 1951^{i c g}
- Stichopogon punctiferus Bigot, 1878^{c g}
- Stichopogon punctus Loew, 1851^{c g}
- Stichopogon pusio (Macquart, 1849)^{c g}
- Stichopogon pygmaeus (Macquart, 1849)^{c g}
- Stichopogon ramakrishnai Joseph & Parui, 1988^{c g}
- Stichopogon rivulorum Lehr, 1975^{c g}
- Stichopogon rubzovi Lehr, 1975^{c g}
- Stichopogon salinus (Melander, 1924)^{i c g}
- Stichopogon scaliger Loew, 1847^{c g}
- Stichopogon schineri Koch, 1872^{c g}
- Stichopogon schnusei (Bezzi, 1910)^{c g}
- Stichopogon selenginus Lehr, 1984^{c g}
- Stichopogon septemcinctus Becker, 1908^{c g}
- Stichopogon sogdianus Lehr, 1975^{c g}
- Stichopogon stackelbergi Lehr, 1975^{c g}
- Stichopogon surcoufi Villeneuve, 1920^{c g}
- Stichopogon tomentosus Oldroyd, 1948^{c g}
- Stichopogon tridactylophagus Lehr, 1975^{c g}
- Stichopogon trifasciatus (Say, 1823)^{i c g b} (three-banded robber fly)
- Stichopogon umkomaasensis Oldroyd, 1974^{c g}
- Stichopogon unicolor Ricardo, 1925^{c g}
- Stichopogon variabilis Lehr, 1975^{c g}
- Stichopogon venezuelanus Kaletta, 1976^{c g}
- Stichopogon venustus Richter, 1963^{c g}
- Stichopogon vernaculus (White, 1918)^{c g}
- Stichopogon villiersi Seguy, 1955^{c g}

Data sources: i = ITIS, c = Catalogue of Life, g = GBIF, b = Bugguide.net
