= Sintoria =

Scientific classification
- Domain: Eukaryota
- Kingdom: Animalia
- Phylum: Arthropoda
- Class: Insecta
- Order: Diptera
- Family: Asilidae
- Subfamily: Stenopogoninae
- Genus: Sintoria; Hull, 1962

Genus of flies

Sintoria is a genus of robber flies (insects in the family Asilidae). There are about six described species in Sintoria.

== Species ==
These six species belong to the genus Sintoria:

- Sintoria cazieri Wilcox, 1972^{i c g}
- Sintoria cyanea Wilcox, 1972^{i c g b}
- Sintoria emeralda Hull, 1962^{c g}
- Sintoria lagunae Wilcox, 1972^{c g}
- Sintoria pappi Wilcox, 1972^{i c g b}
- Sintoria rossi Wilcox, 1972^{c g}

Data sources: i = ITIS, c = Catalogue of Life, g = GBIF, b = Bugguide.net
