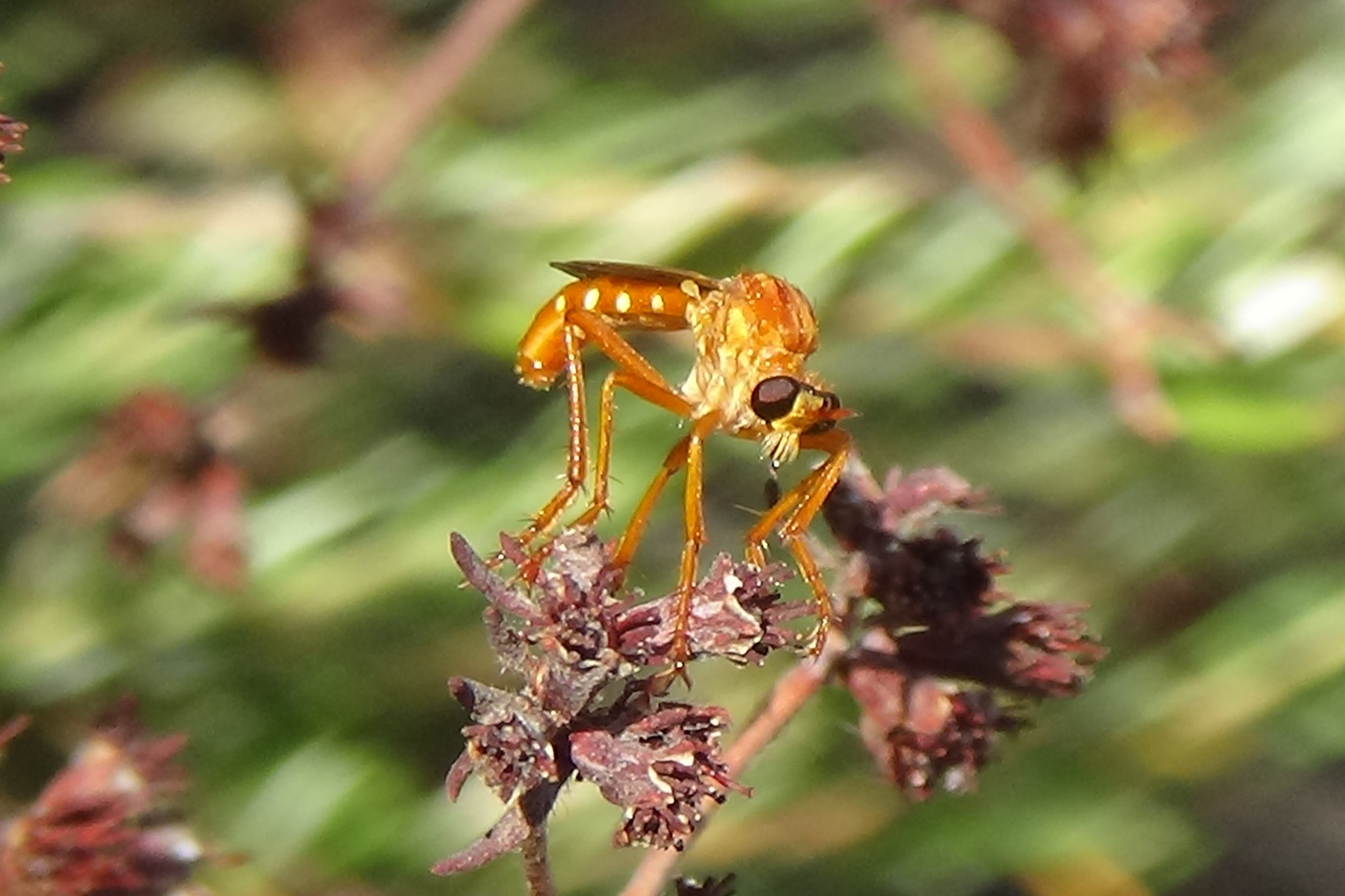
- Saropogon luteus, California

Scientific classification
- Domain: Eukaryota
- Kingdom: Animalia
- Phylum: Arthropoda
- Class: Insecta
- Order: Diptera
- Family: Asilidae
- Genus: Saropogon
- Species: S. luteus

Binomial name
- Saropogon luteus Coquillett, 1904

Synonyms
- Saropogon rufus Back, 1904

= Saropogon luteus =

Species of fly

Saropogon luteus is a species of robber flies (insects in the family Asilidae).
