= Stenopogon inquinatus =

Scientific classification
- Domain: Eukaryota
- Kingdom: Animalia
- Phylum: Arthropoda
- Class: Insecta
- Order: Diptera
- Family: Asilidae
- Genus: Stenopogon
- Species: S. inquinatus

Binomial name
- Stenopogon inquinatus Loew, 1866

Synonyms
- Stenopogon modestus Loew, 1866; Stenopogon morosus Loew, 1874

Species of fly

Stenopogon inquinatus is a species of robber flies, insects in the family Asilidae.
