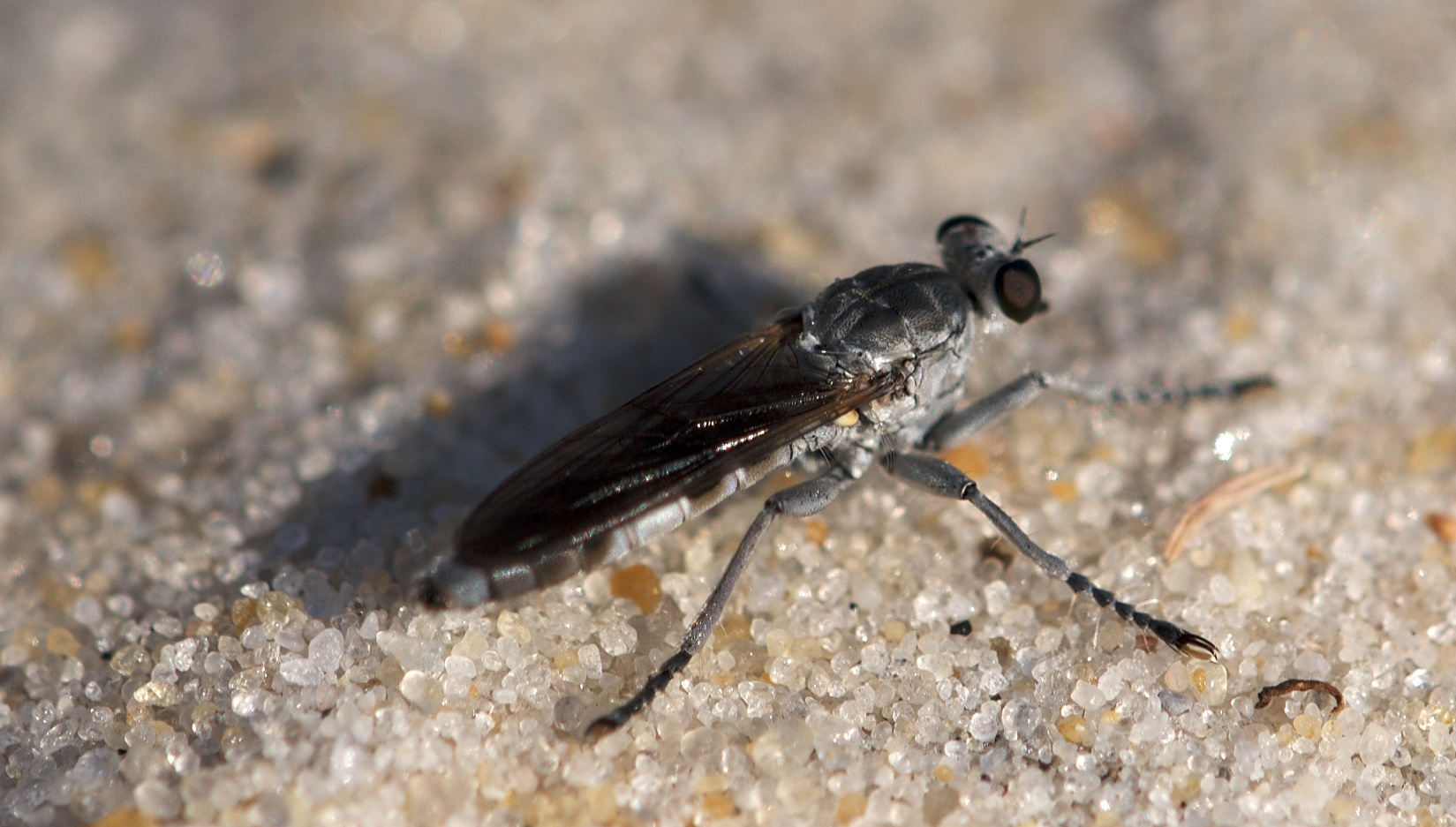

Scientific classification
- Domain: Eukaryota
- Kingdom: Animalia
- Phylum: Arthropoda
- Class: Insecta
- Order: Diptera
- Family: Asilidae
- Genus: Stichopogon
- Species: S. trifasciatus

Binomial name
- Stichopogon trifasciatus (Say, 1823)

Synonyms
- Dasypogon gelascens Walker, 1860; Dasypogon trifasciatus Say, 1823; Stichopogon snowii Bezzi, 1910; Thereva plagiata Walker, 1848

= Stichopogon trifasciatus =

Species of fly

Stichopogon trifasciatus, the three-banded robber fly, is a species of robber flies, insects in the family Asilidae.
