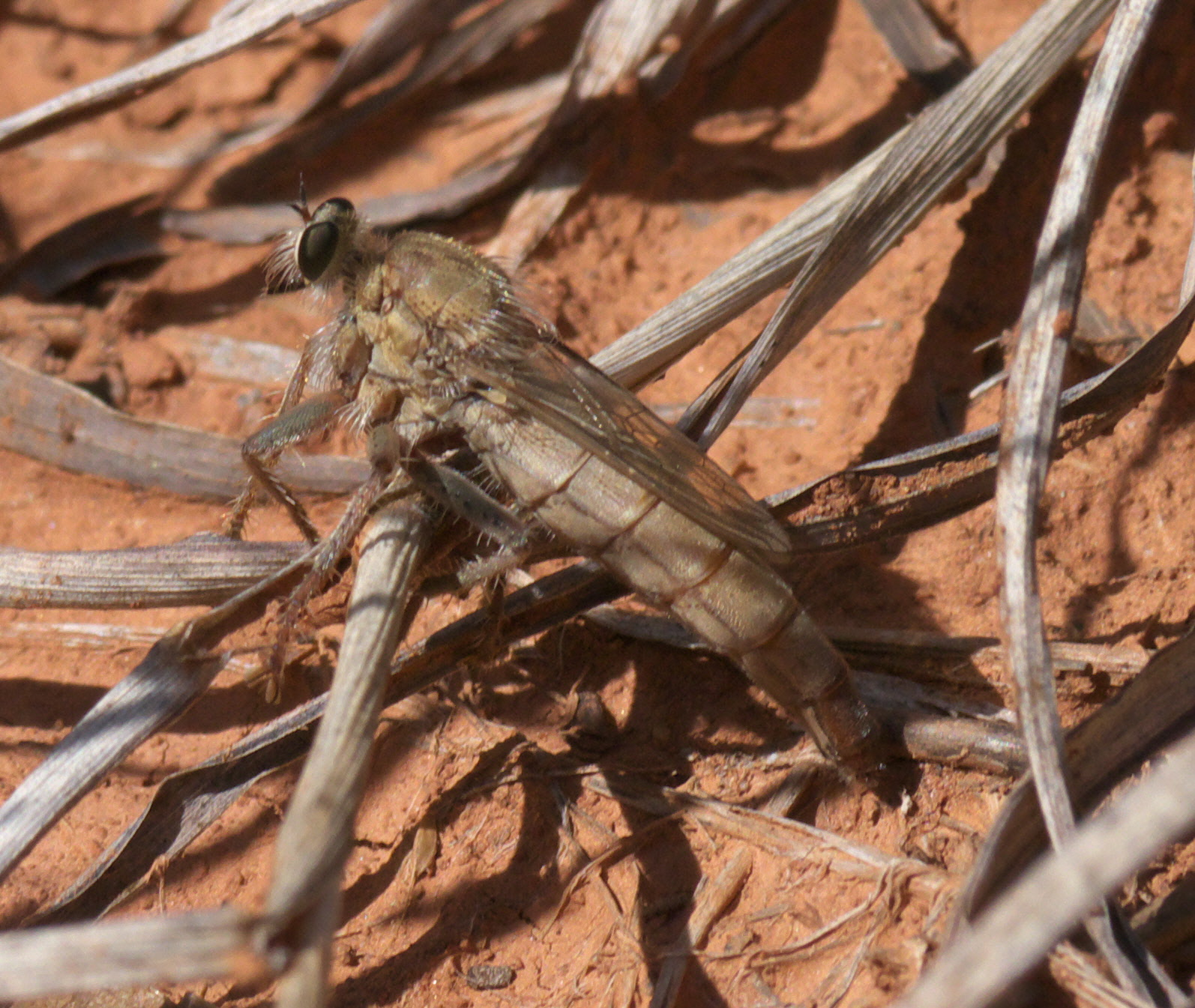
- Scleropogon helvolus

Scientific classification
- Domain: Eukaryota
- Kingdom: Animalia
- Phylum: Arthropoda
- Class: Insecta
- Order: Diptera
- Family: Asilidae
- Subfamily: Stenopogoninae
- Genus: Scleropogon; Loew, 1866

= Scleropogon (fly) =

Genus of flies

Scleropogon is a genus of robber flies (insects in the family Asilidae). There are about 17 described species in Scleropogon.

== Species ==
These 17 species belong to the genus Scleropogon:

- Scleropogon bradleyi (Bromley, 1937)^{i c g b}
- Scleropogon cinerascens (Back, 1909)^{i c g}
- Scleropogon coyote (Bromley, 1931)^{i c g}
- Scleropogon dispar (Bromley, 1937)^{i c g}
- Scleropogon duncani (Bromley, 1937)^{i b}
- Scleropogon floridensis (Bromley, 1951)^{i c g}
- Scleropogon haigi Wilcox, 1971^{i c g b}
- Scleropogon helvolus Loew, 1874^{i c g b}
- Scleropogon huachucanus (Hardy, 1942)^{i c g}
- Scleropogon indistinctus (Bromley, 1937)^{i}
- Scleropogon kelloggi (Wilcox, 137)^{i c g b}
- Scleropogon neglectus (Bromley, 1931)^{i c g}
- Scleropogon picticornis Loew, 1866^{i c g b}
- Scleropogon similis Jones, 1907^{i c g}
- Scleropogon subulatus (Wiedemann, 1828)^{i c g b}
- Scleropogon texanus (Bromley, 1931)^{i b}
- Scleropogon uhleri (Banks, 1920)^{i g}

Data sources: i = ITIS, c = Catalogue of Life, g = GBIF, b = Bugguide.net
