= Scleropogon subulatus =

Scientific classification
- Domain: Eukaryota
- Kingdom: Animalia
- Phylum: Arthropoda
- Class: Insecta
- Order: Diptera
- Family: Asilidae
- Genus: Scleropogon
- Species: S. subulatus

Binomial name
- Scleropogon subulatus (Wiedemann, 1828)

Synonyms
- Dasypogon subulatus Wiedemann, 1828

Species of fly

Scleropogon subulatus is a species of robber flies (insects in the family Asilidae).
