= Saropogon abbreviatus =

Scientific classification
- Domain: Eukaryota
- Kingdom: Animalia
- Phylum: Arthropoda
- Class: Insecta
- Order: Diptera
- Family: Asilidae
- Genus: Saropogon
- Species: S. abbreviatus

Binomial name
- Saropogon abbreviatus Johnson, 1903

Synonyms
- Saropogon bicolor Johnson, 1903

Species of fly

Saropogon abbreviatus is a species of robber flies (insects in the family Asilidae).
