= Stenopogon californiae =

Scientific classification
- Kingdom: Animalia
- Phylum: Arthropoda
- Class: Insecta
- Order: Diptera
- Family: Asilidae
- Genus: Stenopogon
- Species: S. californiae

Binomial name
- Stenopogon californiae (Walker, 1849)

Synonyms
- Dasypogon californiae Walker, 1849

Species of fly

Stenopogon californiae is a species of robber flies, insects in the family Asilidae.
