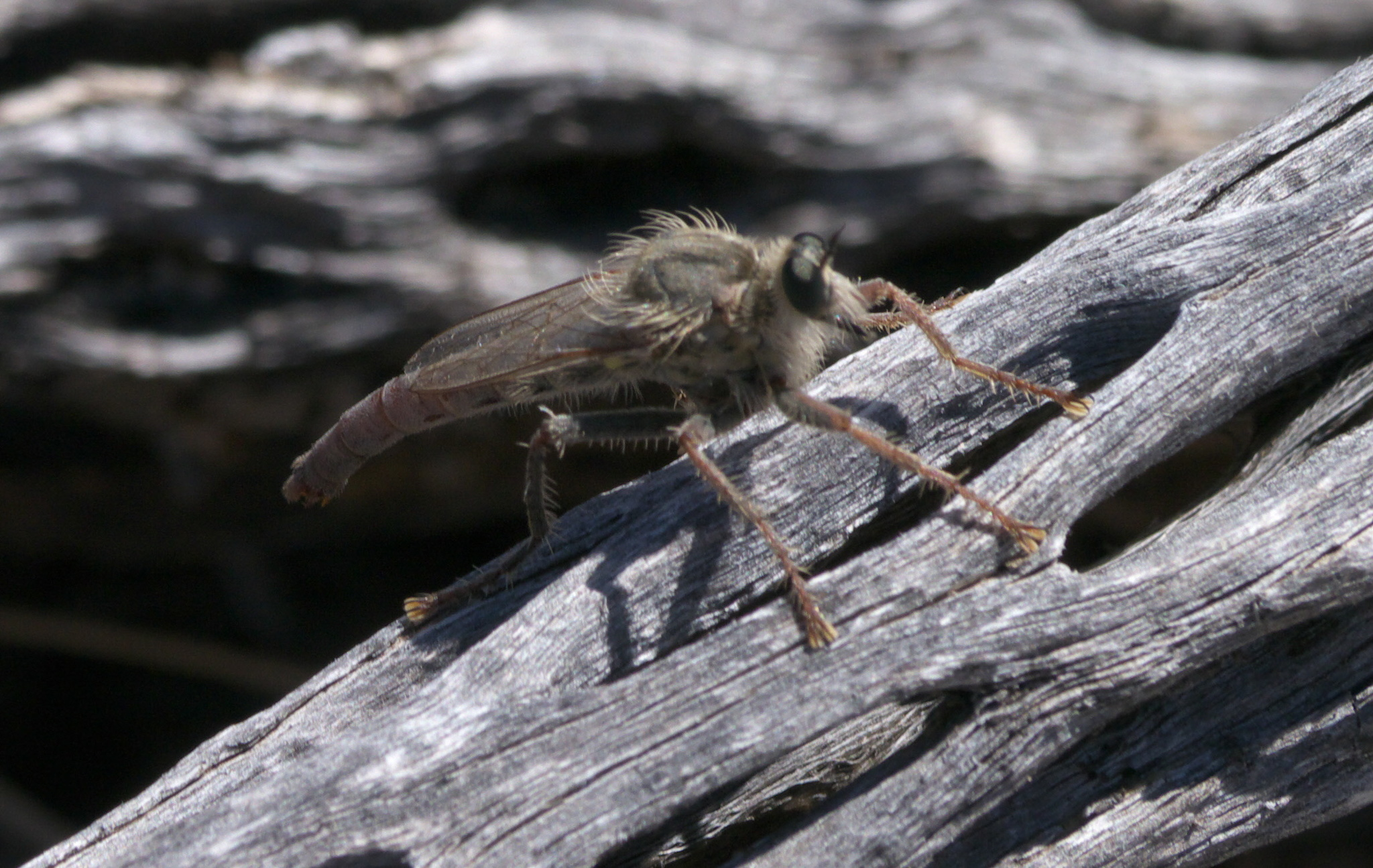
- Scleropogon picticornis, Oklahoma

Scientific classification
- Domain: Eukaryota
- Kingdom: Animalia
- Phylum: Arthropoda
- Class: Insecta
- Order: Diptera
- Family: Asilidae
- Genus: Scleropogon
- Species: S. picticornis

Binomial name
- Scleropogon picticornis Loew, 1866

= Scleropogon picticornis =

Species of fly

Scleropogon picticornis is a species of robber flies (insects in the family Asilidae).
