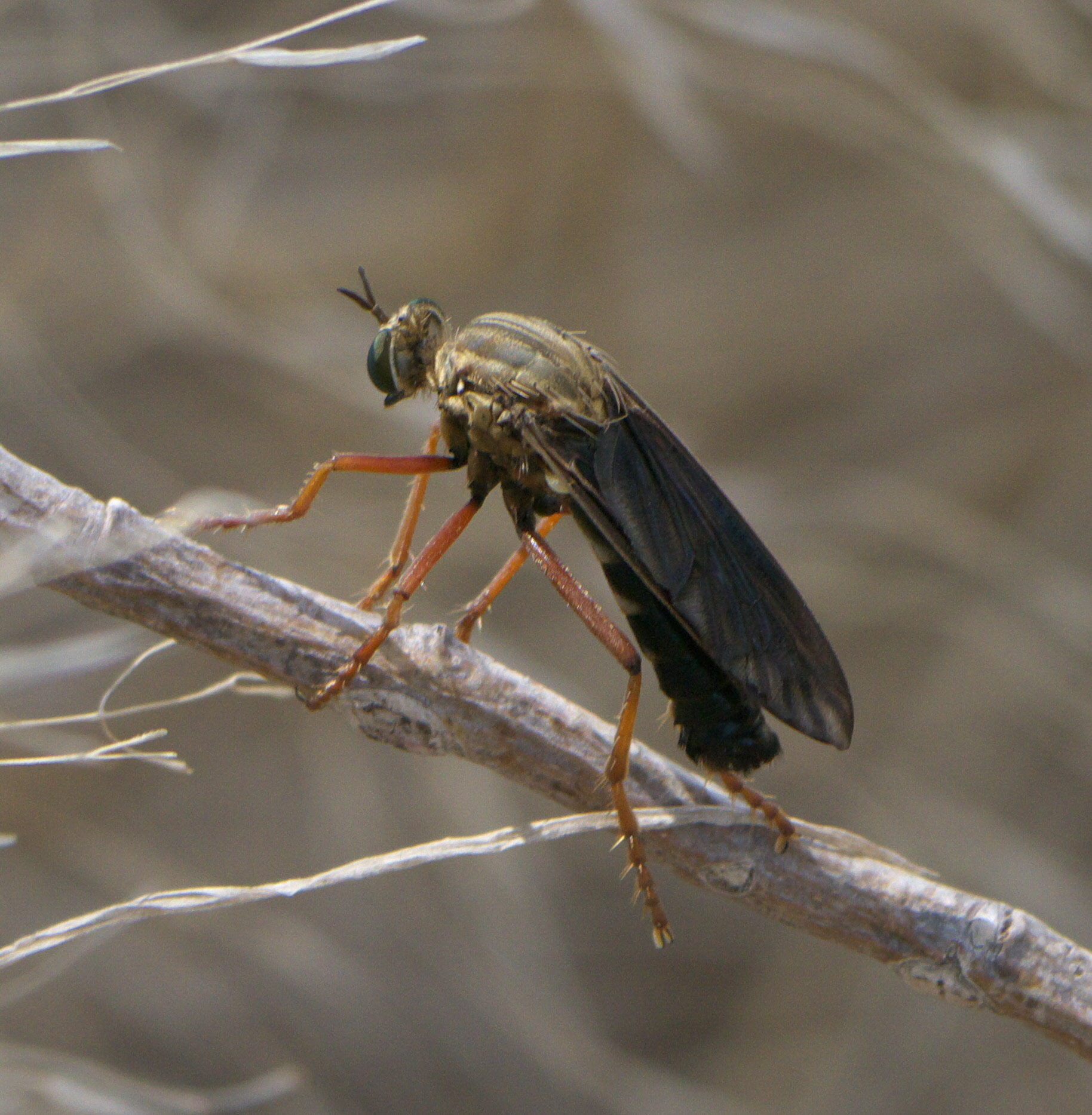

Scientific classification
- Domain: Eukaryota
- Kingdom: Animalia
- Phylum: Arthropoda
- Class: Insecta
- Order: Diptera
- Family: Asilidae
- Genus: Saropogon
- Species: S. pritchardi

Binomial name
- Saropogon pritchardi Bromley, 1934

= Saropogon pritchardi =

Species of fly

Saropogon pritchardi is a species of robber flies (insects in the family Asilidae).

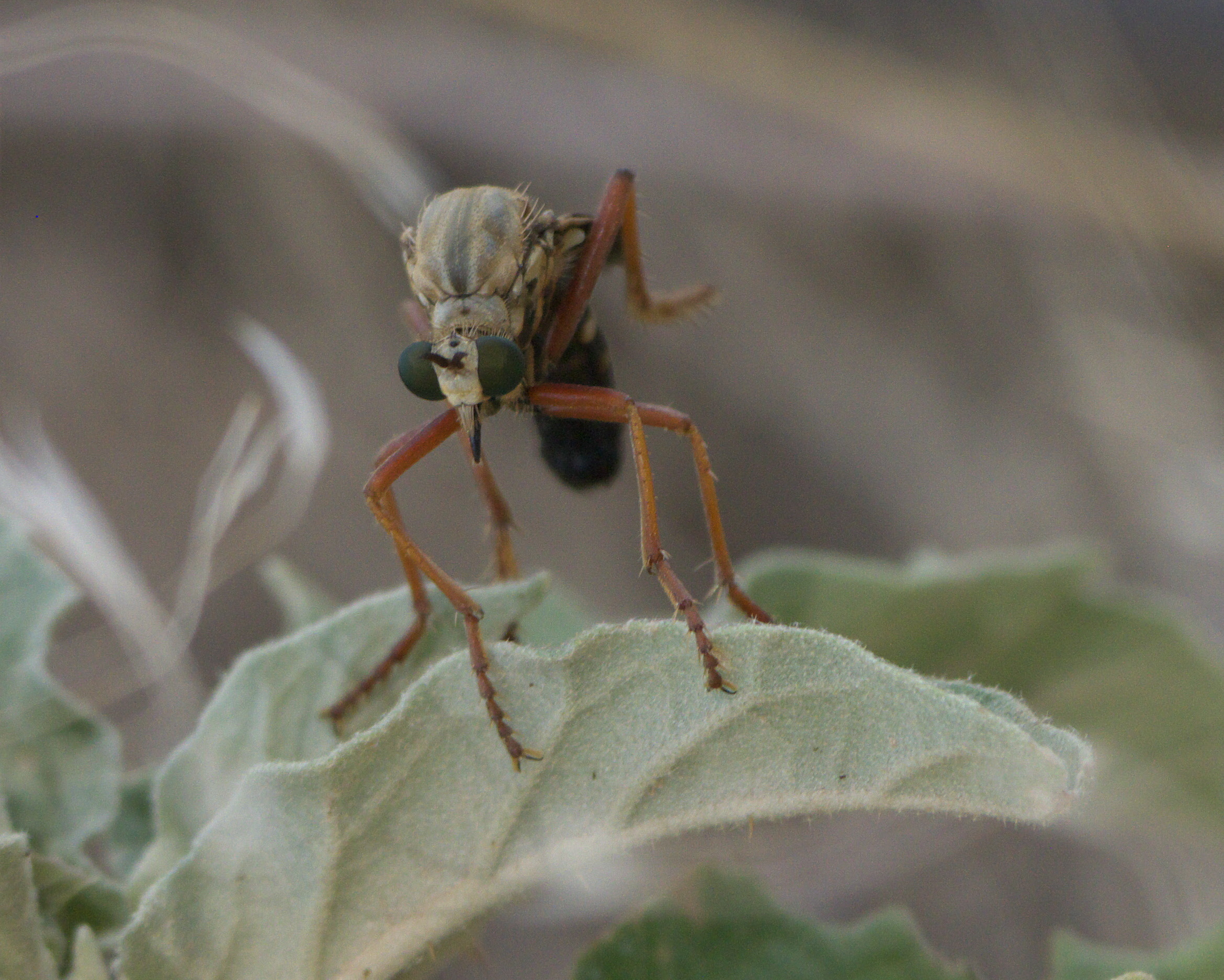

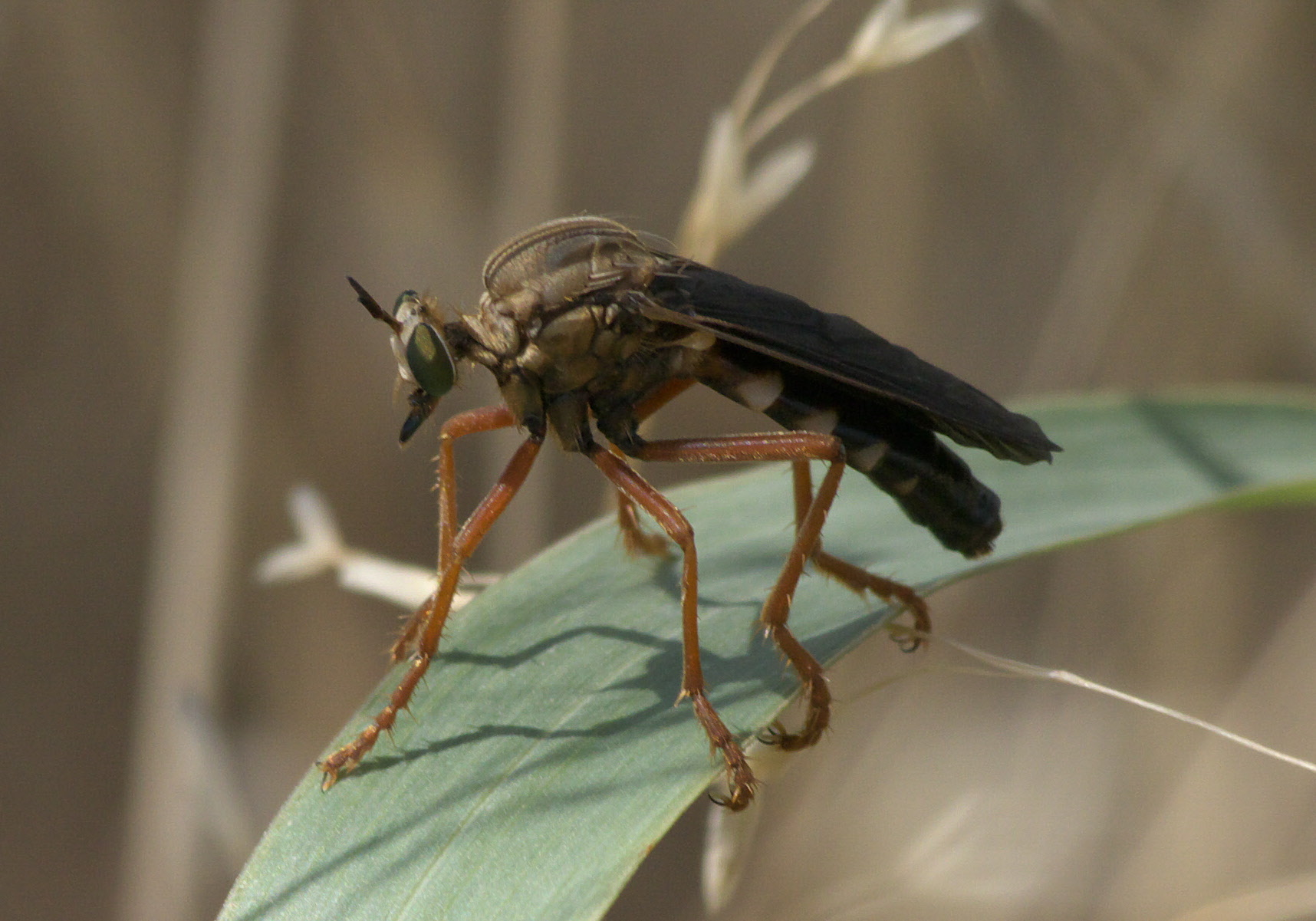
