= Saropogon hypomelas =

Scientific classification
- Domain: Eukaryota
- Kingdom: Animalia
- Phylum: Arthropoda
- Class: Insecta
- Order: Diptera
- Family: Asilidae
- Genus: Saropogon
- Species: S. hypomelas

Binomial name
- Saropogon hypomelas (Loew, 1866)

Synonyms
- Diogmites hypomelas Loew, 1866

Species of fly

Saropogon hypomelas is a species of robber flies (insects in the family Asilidae).
