= Saropogon purus =

Scientific classification
- Domain: Eukaryota
- Kingdom: Animalia
- Phylum: Arthropoda
- Class: Insecta
- Order: Diptera
- Family: Asilidae
- Genus: Saropogon
- Species: S. purus

Binomial name
- Saropogon purus Curran, 1930

Species of fly

Saropogon purus is a species of robber flies (insects in the family Asilidae).
