= Saropogon velutinus =

Scientific classification
- Domain: Eukaryota
- Kingdom: Animalia
- Phylum: Arthropoda
- Class: Insecta
- Order: Diptera
- Family: Asilidae
- Genus: Saropogon
- Species: S. velutinus

Binomial name
- Saropogon velutinus Carrera & Papavero, 1962

Species of fly

Saropogon velutinus is a species of Brachycera in the family of Asilidae (assassin flies). The scientific name of the species was first published in 1962 Carrera & Papvero.
