= Stichopogon colei =

Scientific classification
- Domain: Eukaryota
- Kingdom: Animalia
- Phylum: Arthropoda
- Class: Insecta
- Order: Diptera
- Family: Asilidae
- Genus: Stichopogon
- Species: S. colei

Binomial name
- Stichopogon colei Bromley, 1934

Species of fly

Stichopogon colei is a species of robber flies, insects in the family Asilidae.
