= Scleropogon duncani =

Scientific classification
- Domain: Eukaryota
- Kingdom: Animalia
- Phylum: Arthropoda
- Class: Insecta
- Order: Diptera
- Family: Asilidae
- Genus: Scleropogon
- Species: S. duncani

Binomial name
- Scleropogon duncani (Bromley, 1937)

Synonyms
- Stenopogon duncani Bromley, 1937

Species of fly

Scleropogon duncani is a species of robber flies (insects in the family Asilidae).
