= Stenopogon rufibarbis =

Scientific classification
- Domain: Eukaryota
- Kingdom: Animalia
- Phylum: Arthropoda
- Class: Insecta
- Order: Diptera
- Family: Asilidae
- Genus: Stenopogon
- Species: S. rufibarbis

Binomial name
- Stenopogon rufibarbis Bromley, 1931

Species of fly

Stenopogon rufibarbis is a species of robber flies, insects in the family Asilidae.
