= Scleropogon kelloggi =

Scientific classification
- Domain: Eukaryota
- Kingdom: Animalia
- Phylum: Arthropoda
- Class: Insecta
- Order: Diptera
- Family: Asilidae
- Genus: Scleropogon
- Species: S. kelloggi

Binomial name
- Scleropogon kelloggi (Wilcox, 137)

Synonyms
- Stenopogon kelloggi Wilcox, 1937

Species of fly

Scleropogon kelloggi is a species of robber flies (insects in the family Asilidae).It is found Texas and Arizona.
