= Stenopogon breviusculoides =

Scientific classification
- Domain: Eukaryota
- Kingdom: Animalia
- Phylum: Arthropoda
- Class: Insecta
- Order: Diptera
- Family: Asilidae
- Genus: Stenopogon
- Species: S. breviusculoides

Binomial name
- Stenopogon breviusculoides Bromley, 1937

Species of fly

Stenopogon breviusculoides is a species of robber flies, insects in the family Asilidae.
