= Sintoria pappi =

Scientific classification
- Domain: Eukaryota
- Kingdom: Animalia
- Phylum: Arthropoda
- Class: Insecta
- Order: Diptera
- Family: Asilidae
- Genus: Sintoria
- Species: S. pappi

Binomial name
- Sintoria pappi Wilcox, 1972

Species of fly

Sintoria pappi is a species of robber flies, insects in the family Asilidae.
