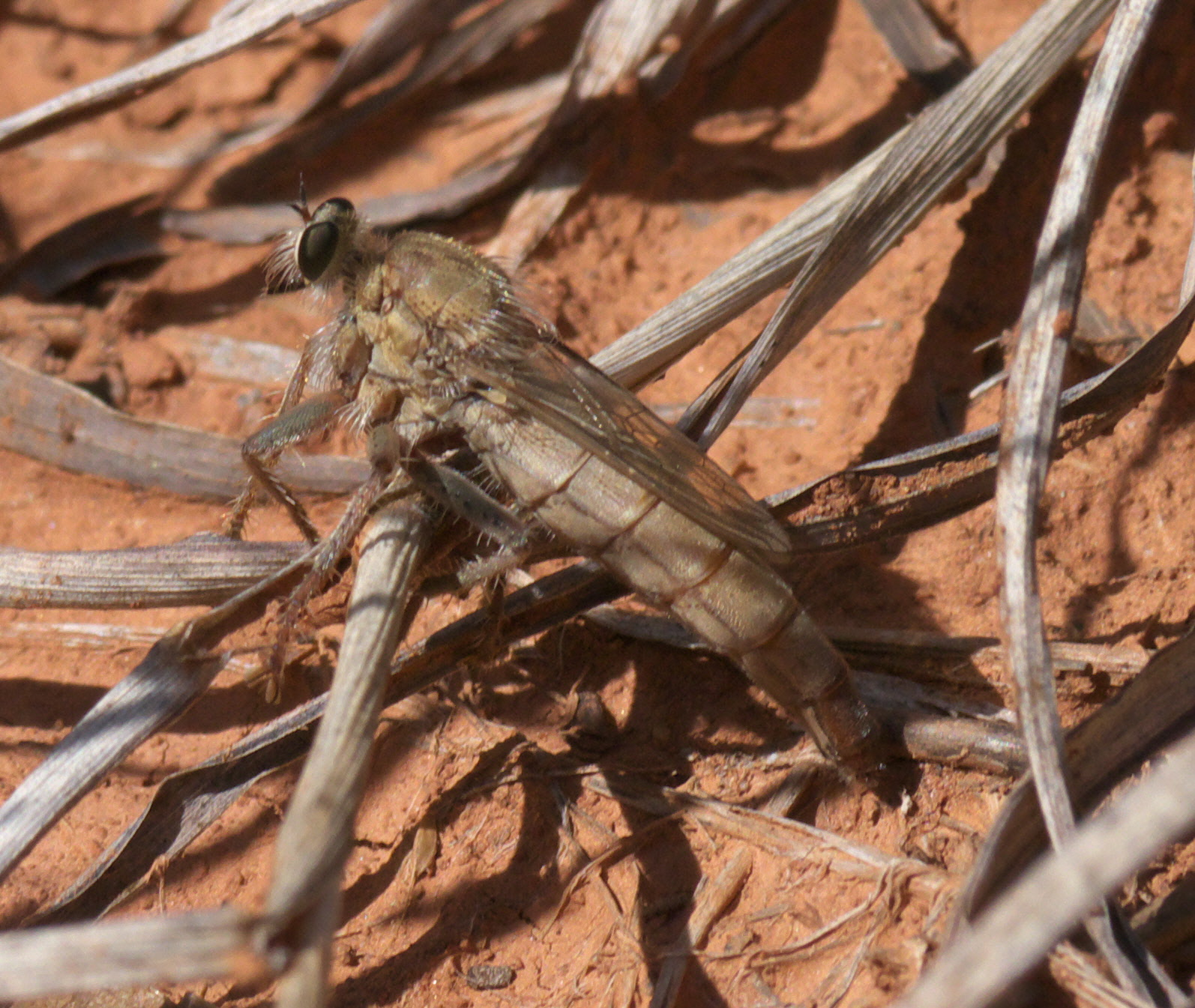

Scientific classification
- Domain: Eukaryota
- Kingdom: Animalia
- Phylum: Arthropoda
- Class: Insecta
- Order: Diptera
- Family: Asilidae
- Genus: Scleropogon
- Species: S. helvolus

Binomial name
- Scleropogon helvolus Loew, 1874

= Scleropogon helvolus =

Species of fly

Scleropogon helvolus is a species of robber flies (insects in the family Asilidae).
