= Scleropogon haigi =

Scientific classification
- Domain: Eukaryota
- Kingdom: Animalia
- Phylum: Arthropoda
- Class: Insecta
- Order: Diptera
- Family: Asilidae
- Genus: Scleropogon
- Species: S. haigi

Binomial name
- Scleropogon haigi Wilcox, 1971

Species of fly

Scleropogon haigi is a species of robber flies (insects in the family Asilidae).
