= Saropogon bryanti =

Scientific classification
- Domain: Eukaryota
- Kingdom: Animalia
- Phylum: Arthropoda
- Class: Insecta
- Order: Diptera
- Family: Asilidae
- Genus: Saropogon
- Species: S. bryanti

Binomial name
- Saropogon bryanti Wilcox, 1966

Species of fly

Saropogon bryanti is a species of robber flies (insects in the family Asilidae).
