= Oskar Theodor =

Israeli entomologist

Oskar Theodor (Hebrew: אוסקר תיאודור; 3 October 1898 – 1987) was an Israeli entomologist who specialised in Diptera.

Born in Königsberg, East Prussia (now Kaliningrad, Russia) he came to pre-Israel Palestine following a year's service as an orderly in the Imperial German Army in World War I. In 1921 he became an assistant in the Government of Palestine Department of Health, and in 1923 he transferred to the Malaria Research Unit in Haifa. In 1925 he became an assistant in the Department of Parasitology in the University of Jerusalem, where he remained for the rest of his career.

In 1928, Oskar Theodor returned briefly to Königsberg to complete his Ph.D. in entomology at the University of Königsberg.
