= Stichopogon argenteus =

Scientific classification
- Domain: Eukaryota
- Kingdom: Animalia
- Phylum: Arthropoda
- Class: Insecta
- Order: Diptera
- Family: Asilidae
- Genus: Stichopogon
- Species: S. argenteus

Binomial name
- Stichopogon argenteus (Say, 1823)

Synonyms
- Dasypogon argenteus Say, 1823

Species of fly

Stichopogon argenteus is a species of robber flies, insects in the family Asilidae.
