= Stichopogon fragilis =

Scientific classification
- Domain: Eukaryota
- Kingdom: Animalia
- Phylum: Arthropoda
- Class: Insecta
- Order: Diptera
- Family: Asilidae
- Genus: Stichopogon
- Species: S. fragilis

Binomial name
- Stichopogon fragilis Back, 1909

Species of fly

Stichopogon fragilis is a species of robber flies, insects in the family Asilidae.
