= Stenopogon engelhardti =

Scientific classification
- Domain: Eukaryota
- Kingdom: Animalia
- Phylum: Arthropoda
- Class: Insecta
- Order: Diptera
- Family: Asilidae
- Genus: Stenopogon
- Species: S. engelhardti

Binomial name
- Stenopogon engelhardti Bromley, 1937

Species of fly

Stenopogon engelhardti is a species of robber flies, insects in the family Asilidae.
