= Sintoria cyanea =

Scientific classification
- Domain: Eukaryota
- Kingdom: Animalia
- Phylum: Arthropoda
- Class: Insecta
- Order: Diptera
- Family: Asilidae
- Genus: Sintoria
- Species: S. cyanea

Binomial name
- Sintoria cyanea Wilcox, 1972

Synonyms
- Sintoria mojavae Wilcox, 1972

Species of fly

Sintoria cyanea is a species of robber flies, insects in the family Asilidae, in the order Diptera ("flies").
