= Stenopogon breviusculus =

Scientific classification
- Domain: Eukaryota
- Kingdom: Animalia
- Phylum: Arthropoda
- Class: Insecta
- Order: Diptera
- Family: Asilidae
- Genus: Stenopogon
- Species: S. breviusculus

Binomial name
- Stenopogon breviusculus Loew, 1872

Species of fly

Stenopogon breviusculus is a species of robber fly (i.e. an insect in the family Asilidae).
