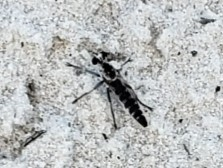

Scientific classification
- Domain: Eukaryota
- Kingdom: Animalia
- Phylum: Arthropoda
- Class: Insecta
- Order: Diptera
- Family: Asilidae
- Genus: Stichopogon
- Species: S. abdominalis

Binomial name
- Stichopogon abdominalis Back, 1909

= Stichopogon abdominalis =

Species of fly

Stichopogon abdominalis is a species of robber fly in the family Asilidae.
