= Saropogon dispar =

Scientific classification
- Domain: Eukaryota
- Kingdom: Animalia
- Phylum: Arthropoda
- Class: Insecta
- Order: Diptera
- Family: Asilidae
- Genus: Saropogon
- Species: S. dispar

Binomial name
- Saropogon dispar Coquillett, 1902

Species of fly

Saropogon dispar is a species of robber flies (insects in the family Asilidae).

Zoologists have reported seeing this species at Natches Pond, Fort Sill, Oklahoma. Photographers have also observed larger specimens in Jefferson County. They found that the Jefferson County Saropogon were at flowering buttonbushes and were also picking off insects.

In Texas Saropogon dispar is the most injurious species of robber fly; they frequent apiaries. A bee keeper destroyed more than 700 of these flies in a single bee yard in a three-day period.
