= Scleropogon bradleyi =

Scientific classification
- Domain: Eukaryota
- Kingdom: Animalia
- Phylum: Arthropoda
- Class: Insecta
- Order: Diptera
- Family: Asilidae
- Genus: Scleropogon
- Species: S. bradleyi

Binomial name
- Scleropogon bradleyi (Bromley, 1937)

Synonyms
- Stenopogon bradleyi Bromley, 1937

Species of fly

Scleropogon bradleyi is a species of robber flies (insects in the family Asilidae).
