= Scleropogon texanus =

Scientific classification
- Domain: Eukaryota
- Kingdom: Animalia
- Phylum: Arthropoda
- Class: Insecta
- Order: Diptera
- Family: Asilidae
- Genus: Scleropogon
- Species: S. texanus

Binomial name
- Scleropogon texanus (Bromley, 1931)

Synonyms
- Stenopogon texanus Bromley, 1931

Species of fly

Scleropogon texanus is a species of robber flies (insects in the family Asilidae).
