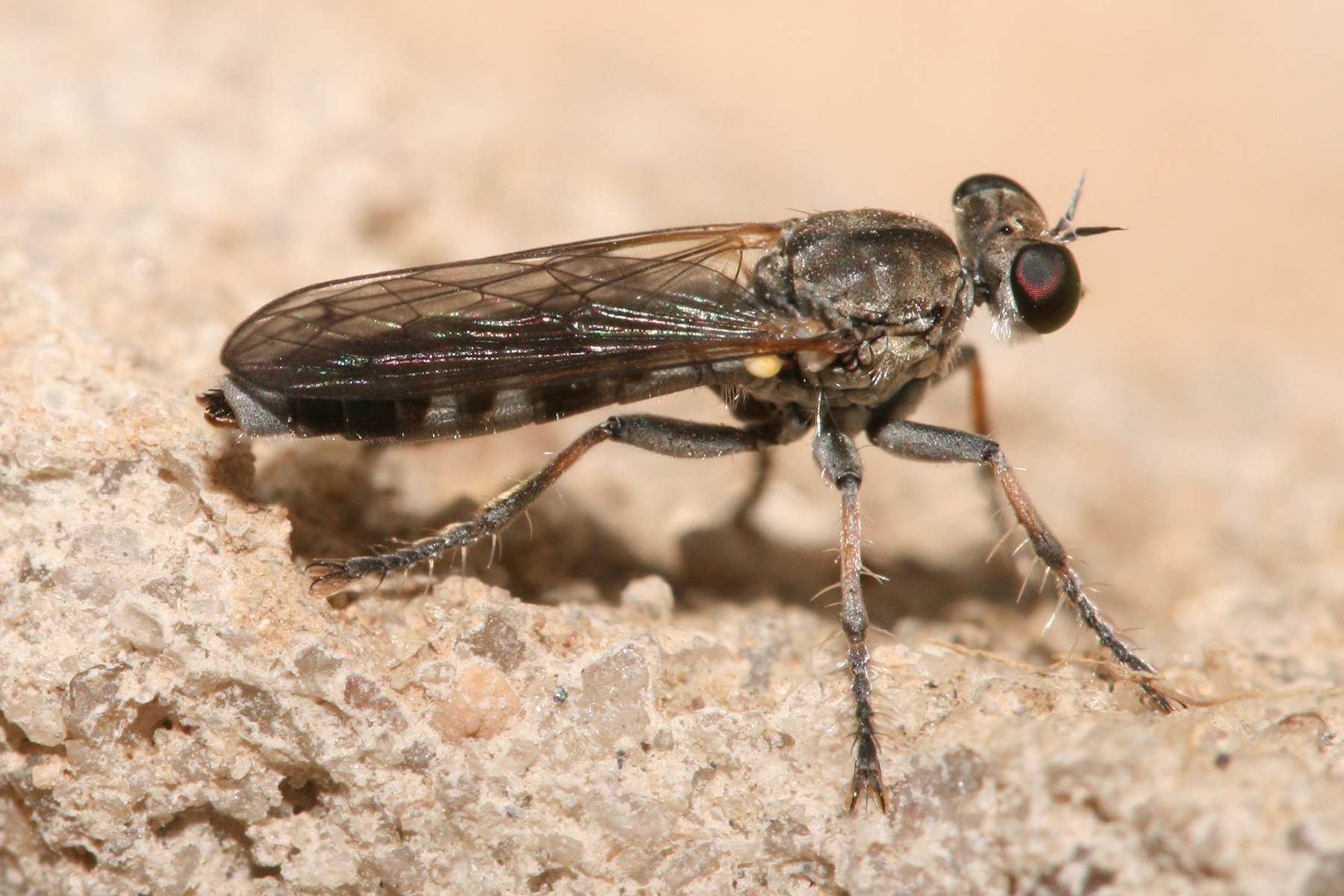
- Stichopogon sp.

Scientific classification
- Domain: Eukaryota
- Kingdom: Animalia
- Phylum: Arthropoda
- Class: Insecta
- Order: Diptera
- Family: Asilidae
- Subfamily: Stichopogoninae
- Genus: Stichopogon; Loew, 1847

Diversity
- at least 100 species

= Stichopogon =

Genus of flies

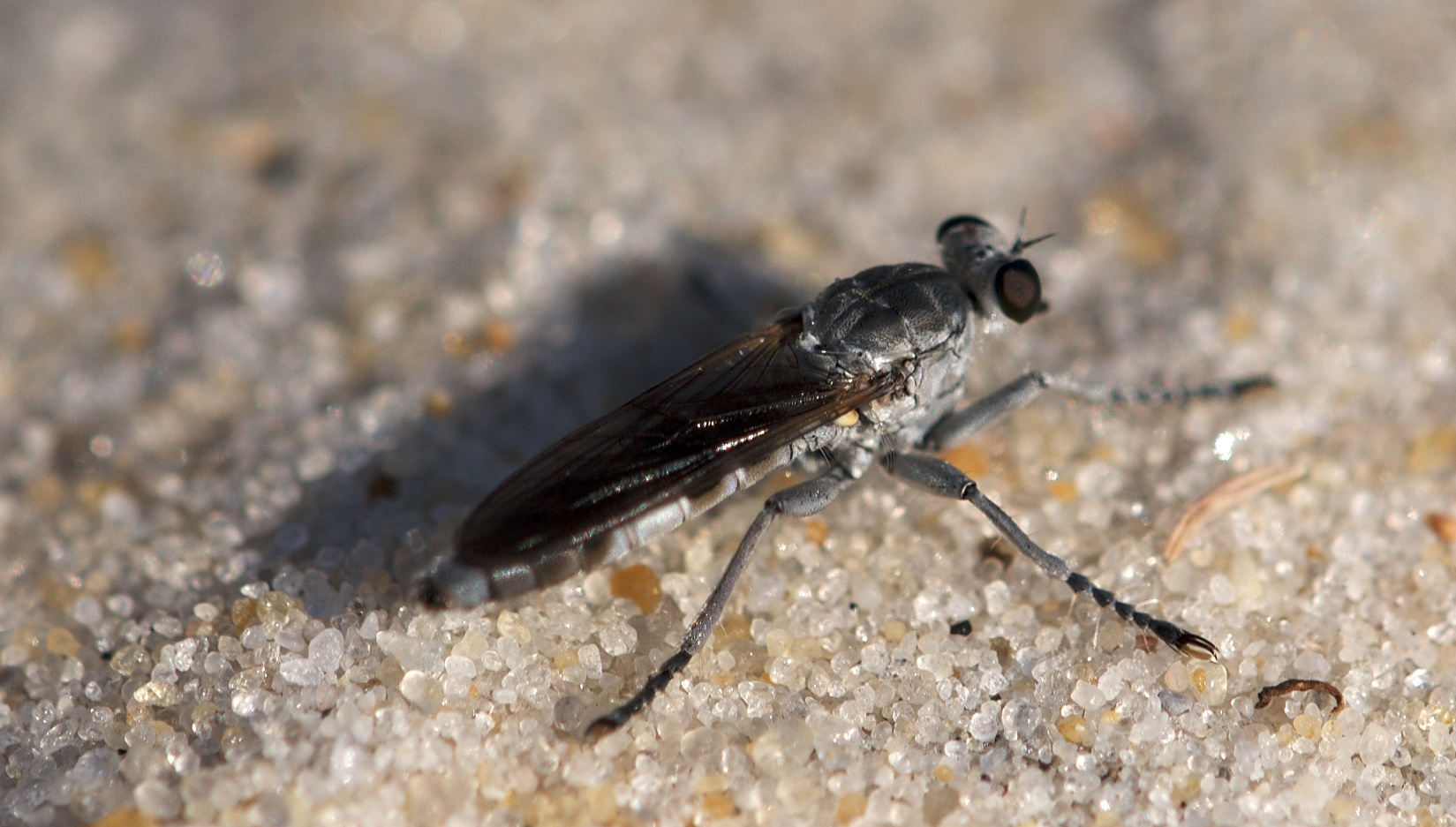
Stichopogon trifasciatus, Three-banded Robber Fly

Stichopogon is a genus of small robber flies of the subfamily Dasypogoninae. There are at least 100 described species in Stichopogon.

== See also ==
- List of Stichopogon species
