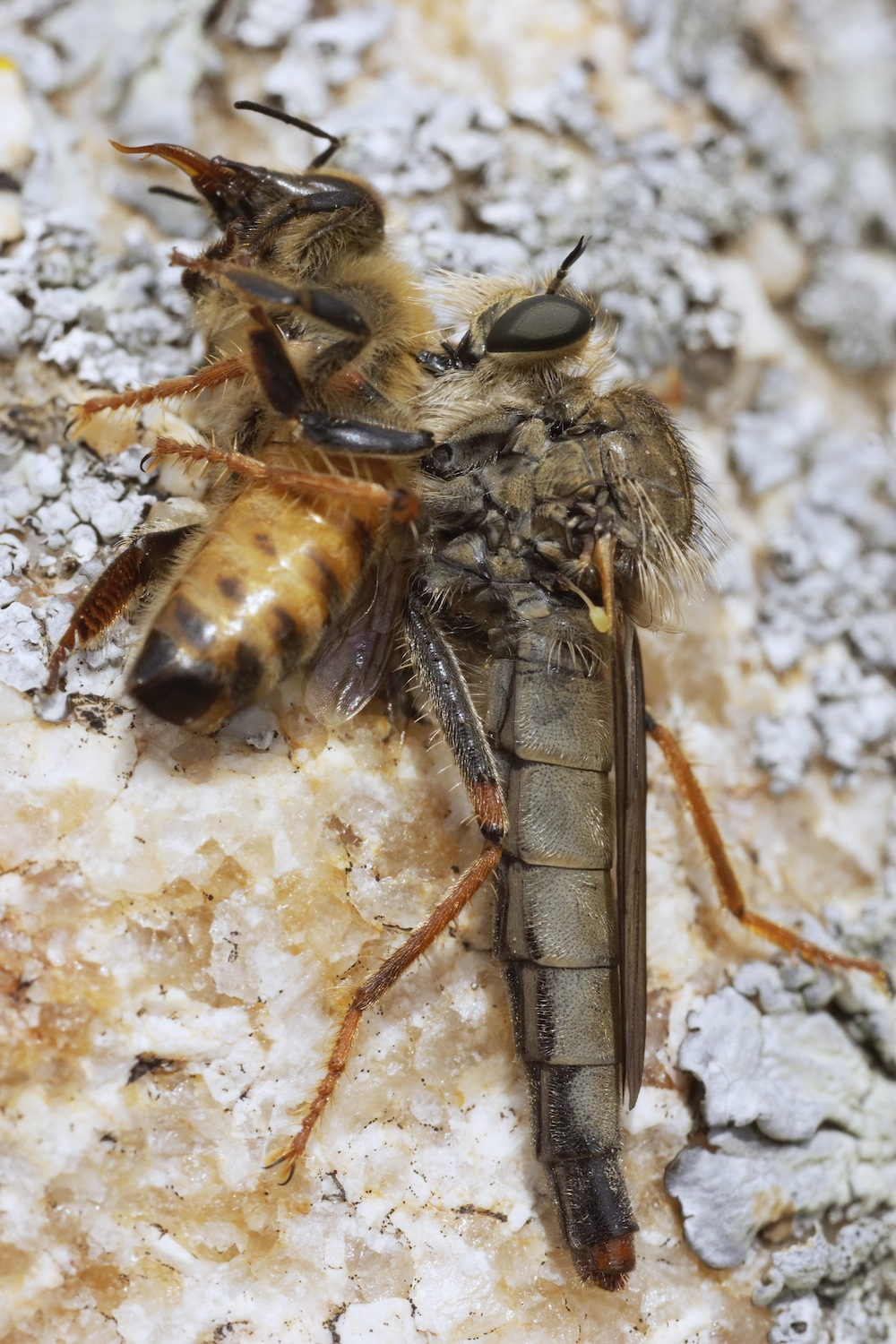
- Stenopogon martini

Scientific classification
- Domain: Eukaryota
- Kingdom: Animalia
- Phylum: Arthropoda
- Class: Insecta
- Order: Diptera
- Family: Asilidae
- Subfamily: Stenopogoninae
- Genus: Stenopogon; Loew, 1847

Diversity
- at least 200 species

= Stenopogon =

Genus of flies

Stenopogon is a genus of robber flies, insects in the family Asilidae. There are at least 200 described species in Stenopogon.

== See also ==
- List of Stenopogon species
