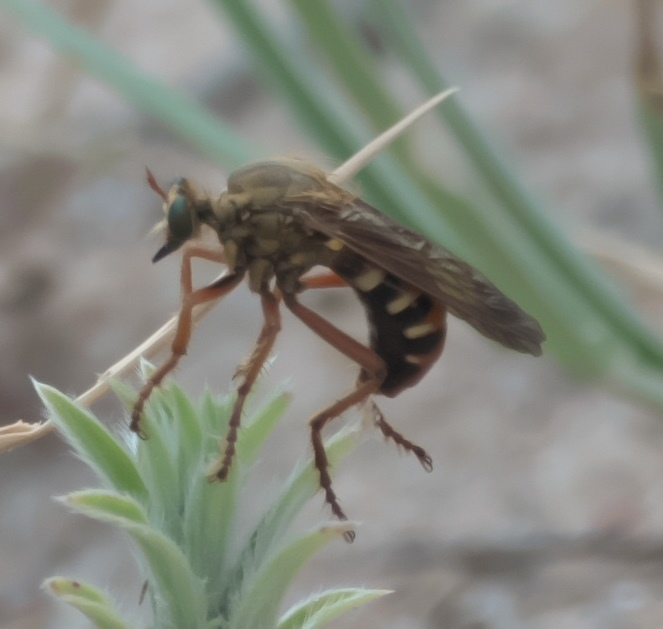

Scientific classification
- Domain: Eukaryota
- Kingdom: Animalia
- Phylum: Arthropoda
- Class: Insecta
- Order: Diptera
- Family: Asilidae
- Subfamily: Dasypogoninae
- Genus: Saropogon; Loew, 1847

Diversity
- at least 120 species

= Saropogon =

Genus of flies

Saropogon is a genus of robber flies (insects in the family Asilidae). There are at least 120 described species in Saropogon.

== See also ==
- List of Saropogon species
