= List of Asilidae species: H =

This article lists described species of the family Asilidae start with letter H.

A • B • C • D • E • F • G • H • I • J • K • L • M • N • O • P • Q • R • S • T • U • V • W • Y • Z

== List of species ==
=== Genus Habropogon ===
- Habropogon aegyptius (Efflatoun, 1937)
- Habropogon aerivagus (Séguy, 1953)
- Habropogon albibarbis (Macquart, 1838)
- Habropogon appendiculatus (Schiner, 1867)
- Habropogon bacescui (Weinberg & Tsacas, 1973)
- Habropogon balachowskyi (Weinberg & Tsacas, 1973)
- Habropogon bipartitus (Villeneuve, 1931)
- Habropogon capensis (Londt, 1981)
- Habropogon carthaginiensis (Becker, 1915)
- Habropogon cochraneae (Londt, 2000)
- Habropogon decipiens (Theodor, 1980)
- Habropogon deserticola (Lehr, 1960)
- Habropogon distipilosus (Weinberg & Tsacas, 1973)
- Habropogon doriae (Rondani, 1873)
- Habropogon elongatulus (Efflatoun, 1937)
- Habropogon francoisi (Janssens, 1969)
- Habropogon fulvulus (Theodor, 1980)
- Habropogon hauseri (Hradský & Geller-Grimm, 2005)
- Habropogon hessei (Londt, 2000)
- Habropogon hilaryae (Londt, 2000)
- Habropogon karooensis (Londt, 2000)
- Habropogon latifrons (Loew, 1871)
- Habropogon lineatus (Lehr, 1960)
- Habropogon longiventris (Loew, 1847)
- Habropogon malkovskii (Lehr, 1960)
- Habropogon montanus (Lehr, 1960)
- Habropogon namibiensis (Londt, 1999)
- Habropogon odontophallus (Weinberg & Tsacas, 1973)
- Habropogon parappendiculatus (Weinberg & Tsacas, 1973)
- Habropogon pertusus (Becker, 1908)
- Habropogon prionophallus (Weinberg & Tsacas, 1973)
- Habropogon pyrrhophaeus (Weinberg & Tsacas, 1973)
- Habropogon rubriventris (Macquart, 1849)
- Habropogon rufulus (Lehr, 1960)
- Habropogon senilis (Wulp, 1899)
- Habropogon similimus (Theodor, 1980)
- Habropogon tricolor (Theodor, 1980)
- Habropogon verticalis (Becker, 1913)
- Habropogon vittatus (Weinberg & Tsacas, 1973)

=== Genus Hadrokolos ===
- Hadrokolos cazieri (Martin, 1959)
- Hadrokolos notialis (Martin, 1967)
- Hadrokolos pritchardi (Martin, 1959)
- Hadrokolos texanus (Bromley, 1934)

=== Genus Haplopogon ===
- Haplopogon bullatus (Bromley, 1934)
- Haplopogon dicksoni (Wilcox, 1966)
- Haplopogon erinus (Pritchard, 1941)
- Haplopogon nudus (Engel, 1930)
- Haplopogon parkeri (Wilcox, 1966)
- Haplopogon triangulatus (Martin, 1955)
- Haplopogon utahensis (Wilcox, 1966)

=== Genus Haroldia ===
- Haroldia oldroydi (Londt, 1999)
- Haroldia trivialis (Oldroyd, 1974)

=== Genus Harpagobroma ===
- Harpagobroma fumosum (Hull, 1962)

=== Genus Heligmonevra ===
- Heligmonevra africana (Ricardo, 1925)
- Heligmonevra albiseta (Martin, 1964)
- Heligmonevra anamalaiensis (Joseph & Parui, 1980)
- Heligmonevra andamenensis (Joseph & Parui, 1980)
- Heligmonevra assamensis (Joseph & Parui, 1987)
- Heligmonevra astricta (Martin, 1964)
- Heligmonevra bengalensis (Joseph & Parui, 1986)
- Heligmonevra bigoti (Joseph & Parui, 1984)
- Heligmonevra calceoIaria (Scarbrough & Duncan, 2004)
- Heligmonevra chaetoprocta (Hull, 1962)
- Heligmonevra cheriani (Joseph & Parui, 1980)
- Heligmonevra debilis (Walker, 1857)
- Heligmonevra didymoides (Walker, 1864)
- Heligmonevra divaricata (Oldroyd, 1972)
- Heligmonevra dravidica (Joseph & Parui, 1980)
- Heligmonevra elaphra (Oldroyd, 1972)
- Heligmonevra flagrans (Walker, 1857)
- Heligmonevra flavida (Martin, 1964)
- Heligmonevra forcipatus (Meijere, 1915)
- Heligmonevra frommeri (Joseph & Parui, 1980)
- Heligmonevra gracilis (Martin, 1964)
- Heligmonevra himalayana (Joseph & Parui, 1987)
- Heligmonevra incisuralis (Joseph & Parui, 1986)
- Heligmonevra insularis (Engel, 1927)
- Heligmonevra kumaunensis (Joseph & Parui, 1980)
- Heligmonevra ladakhensis (Joseph & Parui, 1987)
- Heligmonevra laevis (Walker, 1861)
- Heligmonevra laevis (Engel, 1927)
- Heligmonevra lata (Martin, 1964)
- Heligmonevra lavignei (Joseph & Parui, 1980)
- Heligmonevra litoralis (Lindner, 1955)
- Heligmonevra macula (Martin, 1964)
- Heligmonevra madagascarensis (Bromley, 1942)
- Heligmonevra mediana (Bromley, 1931)
- Heligmonevra mehtai (Joseph & Parui, 1993)
- Heligmonevra miniata (Oldroyd, 1960)
- Heligmonevra modesta (Bigot, 1858)
- Heligmonevra nigra (Martin, 1964)
- Heligmonevra nigrifascia (Martin, 1964)
- Heligmonevra nigrostriata (Engel, 1930)
- Heligmonevra nuda (Bezzi, 1906)
- Heligmonevra occidentalis (Ricardo, 1925)
- Heligmonevra ornata (Lindner, 1955)
- Heligmonevra poonmudiensis (Joseph & Parui, 1980)
- Heligmonevra pulcher (Ricardo, 1919)
- Heligmonevra pygmaea (Oldroyd, 1972)
- Heligmonevra ricardoi (Joseph & Parui, 1980)
- Heligmonevra rodhaini (Oldroyd, 1970)
- Heligmonevra rubripes (Ricardo, 1922)
- Heligmonevra rufipes (Meijere, 1913)
- Heligmonevra russea (Martin, 1964)
- Heligmonevra seminuda (Oldroyd, 1972)
- Heligmonevra shimogaensis (Joseph & Parui, 1980)
- Heligmonevra spreta (Wulp, 1898)
- Heligmonevra sula (Oldroyd, 1972)
- Heligmonevra trifurca (Shi, 1992)
- Heligmonevra tsacasi (Joseph & Parui, 1986)
- Heligmonevra yenpingensis (Bromley, 1928)

=== Genus Helolaphyctis ===
- Helolaphyctis chrysorhea (Hull, 1958)
- Helolaphyctis nitida (Hull, 1958)

=== Genus Hermannomyia ===
- Hermannomyia engeli (Hull, 1962)
- Hermannomyia oldroydi Londt, 1981
- Hermannomyia ukasi Londt & Copeland, 2013

=== Genus Heteropogon ===
- Heteropogon alter (Becker, 1915)
- Heteropogon arizonensis (Wilcox, 1941)
- Heteropogon aurocinctus (Séguy, 1934)
- Heteropogon cazieri (Wilcox, 1965)
- Heteropogon chircahua (Wilcox, 1965)
- Heteropogon cirrhatus (Osten-Sacken, 1877)
- Heteropogon currani (Pritchard, 1935)
- Heteropogon davisi (Wilcox, 1965)
- Heteropogon dejectus (Williston, 1901)
- Heteropogon divisus (Coquillett, 1902)
- Heteropogon dorothyae (Martin, 1962)
- Heteropogon duncani (Wilcox, 1941)
- Heteropogon eburnus (Walker, 1849)
- Heteropogon elegans (Becker, 1907)
- Heteropogon erinaceus (Loew, 1871)
- Heteropogon filicornis (Loew, 1871)
- Heteropogon fisheri (Wilcox, 1965)
- Heteropogon flavobarbatus (Becker, 1907)
- Heteropogon impudicus (Janssens, 1961)
- Heteropogon lautus (Loew, 1872)
- Heteropogon lehri (Richter, 1968)
- Heteropogon loewi (Lehr, 1970)
- Heteropogon ludius (Coquillett, 1893)
- Heteropogon lugubris (Hermann, 1906)
- Heteropogon maculinervis (James, 1937)
- Heteropogon manicatus (Meigen, 1820)
- Heteropogon manni (Loew, 1854)
- Heteropogon martini (Wilcox, 1965)
- Heteropogon nitidus (Oldroyd, 1964)
- Heteropogon ornatipes (Loew, 1851)
- Heteropogon palaestinensis (Theodor, 1980)
- Heteropogon patruelis (Coquillett, 1893)
- Heteropogon paurosomus (Pritchard, 1935)
- Heteropogon phalna (Walker, 1849)
- Heteropogon phoenicurus (Loew, 1872)
- Heteropogon rejectus (Williston, 1901)
- Heteropogon rubidus (Coquillett, 1893)
- Heteropogon rubrifasciatus (Bromley, 1931)
- Heteropogon scoparius (Loew, 1847)
- Heteropogon senilis (Bigot, 1878)
- Heteropogon spatulatus (Pritchard, 1935)
- Heteropogon stonei (Wilcox, 1965)
- Heteropogon succinctus (Loew, 1847)
- Heteropogon timondavidi (Tsacas, 1970)
- Heteropogon tolandi (Wilcox, 1965)
- Heteropogon wilcoxi (James, 1934)
- Heteropogon willistoni (Martin, 1962)

=== Genus Hippomachus ===
- Hippomachus amnoni (Londt, 1985)
- Hippomachus engeli (Londt, 1983)
- Hippomachus furcatus (Londt, 1985)
- Hippomachus hermanni (Londt, 1983)
- Hippomachus iranensis (Londt, 1985)
- Hippomachus leechi (Londt, 1985)
- Hippomachus rossi (Londt, 1985)

=== Genus Hodites ===
- Hodites punctissima (Hull, 1962)

=== Genus Hodophylax ===
- Hodophylax aridus (James, 1933)
- Hodophylax basingeri (Pritchard, 1938)
- Hodophylax halli (Wilcox, 1961)
- Hodophylax tolandi (Wilcox, 1961)

=== Genus Holcocephala ===
- Holcocephala affinis (Bellardi, 1861)
- Holcocephala agalla (Walker, 1849)
- Holcocephala bechyneorum (Ayala, 1982)
- Holcocephala calva (Loew, 1872)
- Holcocephala curvicosta (Carrera, 1958)
- Holcocephala deltoidea (Bellardi, 1861)
- Holcocephala dimidiata (Hermann, 1924)
- Holcocephala fernandezi (Ayala, 1982)
- Holcocephala fimbriata (Hermann, 1924)
- Holcocephala fusca (Bromley, 1951)
- Holcocephala indigena (Scarbrough, 2003)
- Holcocephala inornata (Rondani, 1848)
- Holcocephala macula (Rondani, 1848)
- Holcocephala matteii (Ayala, 1982)
- Holcocephala minuta (Bellardi, 1861)
- Holcocephala mogiana (Carrera, 1955)
- Holcocephala monticola (Ayala, 1982)
- Holcocephala nodosipes (Enderlein, 1914)
- Holcocephala obscuripennis (Enderlein, 1914)
- Holcocephala oculata (Fabricius, 1805)
- Holcocephala pardalina (Hermann, 1924)
- Holcocephala pectinata (Carrera, 1955)
- Holcocephala pennipes (Hermann, 1924)
- Holcocephala peruviana (Hermann, 1924)
- Holcocephala rufithorax (Wiedemann, 1828)
- Holcocephala scopifer (Schiner, 1868)
- Holcocephala spinipes (Hermann, 1924)
- Holcocephala stylata (Pritchard, 1938)
- Holcocephala uruguayensis (Lynch & Arribálzaga, 1882)
- Holcocephala vallestris (Ayala, 1982)
- Holcocephala vicina (Macquart, 1838)
- Holcocephala vittata (Walker, 1837)

=== Genus Holopogon ===
- Holopogon acropennis (Martin, 1959)
- Holopogon albipilosus (Curran, 1923)
- Holopogon angustifacies (Lehr, 1972)
- Holopogon atrifrons (Cole, 1924)
- Holopogon atripennis (Back, 1909)
- Holopogon auribarbis (Meigen, 1820)
- Holopogon binotatus (Loew, 1870)
- Holopogon bullatus (Wulp, 1882)
- Holopogon chalcogaster (Dufour, 1850)
- Holopogon claripennis (Loew, 1856)
- Holopogon cognatus (Richter, 1964)
- Holopogon cornutus (Theodor, 1980)
- Holopogon currani (Martin, 1959)
- Holopogon dichromatopus (Bezzi, 1926)
- Holopogon dolicharista (Lehr, 1972)
- Holopogon fisheri (Martin, 1967)
- Holopogon flavotibialis (Strobl, 1909)
- Holopogon imbecillus (Loew, 1871)
- Holopogon japonicus (Nagatomi, 1983)
- Holopogon kirgizorum (Peck, 1977)
- Holopogon kiritshenkoi (Lehr, 1972)
- Holopogon kugleri (Theodor, 1980)
- Holopogon melaleucus (Meigen, 1820)
- Holopogon melas (Dufour, 1852)
- Holopogon mica (Martin, 1967)
- Holopogon mingusae (Martin, 1959)
- Holopogon negrus (Lehr, 1972)
- Holopogon nigripennis (Meigen, 1820)
- Holopogon nigripilosa (Adisoemarto, 1967)
- Holopogon nigropilosus (Theodor, 1980)
- Holopogon oriens (Martin, 1959)
- Holopogon pulcher (Williston, 1901)
- Holopogon pusillus (Macquart, 1838)
- Holopogon quadrinotatus (Séguy, 1953)
- Holopogon rugiventris (Strobl, 1906)
- Holopogon sapphirus (Martin, 1967)
- Holopogon seniculus (Loew, 1866)
- Holopogon siculus (Macquart, 1834)
- Holopogon snowi (Back, 1909)
- Holopogon stellatus (Martin, 1959)
- Holopogon turkmenicus (Lehr, 1972)
- Holopogon ui (Tomasovic, 2005)
- Holopogon violaceus (Williston, 1901)
- Holopogon vockerothi (Martin, 1959)
- Holopogon wilcoxi (Martin, 1959)

=== Genus Hoplistomerus ===
- Hoplistomerus caliginosus (Wulp, 1899)
- Hoplistomerus erythropus (Bezzi, 1915)
- Hoplistomerus garambensis (Oldroyd, 1970)
- Hoplistomerus miniatus (Oldroyd, 1940)
- Hoplistomerus nobilis (Loew, 1858)
- Hoplistomerus oldroydi (Londt, 2007)
- Hoplistomerus pegos (Londt, 2007)
- Hoplistomerus quintillus (Oldroyd, 1940)
- Hoplistomerus zelimina (Speiser, 1910)

=== Genus Hoplopheromerus ===
- Hoplopheromerus guangdongi (Tomasovic, 2006)
- Hoplopheromerus hirtiventris (Becker, 1925)
- Hoplopheromerus podagricus (Bezzi, 1914)
- Hoplopheromerus brunnescens (Tsacas & Oldroyd, 1967)
- Hoplopheromerus brunnipes (Tsacas & Oldroyd, 1967)
- Hoplopheromerus flavescens (Tsacas & Oldroyd, 1967)
- Hoplopheromerus nigroides (Tsacas & Oldroyd, 1967)
- Hoplopheromerus nigropilosus (Tsacas & Oldroyd, 1967)

=== Genus Hoplotriclis ===
- Hoplotriclis pallasii (Wiedemann, 1828)

=== Genus Hullia ===
- Hullia commoni (Paramonov, 1964)

=== Genus Hybozelodes ===
- Hybozelodes acuticornis (Carrera, 1945)
- Hybozelodes albipes (Hermann, 1912)
- Hybozelodes clausicella (Carrera, 1960)
- Hybozelodes comatus (Hermann, 1912)
- Hybozelodes conjungens (Hermann, 1912)
- Hybozelodes dispar (Hermann, 1912)
- Hybozelodes fulvipes (Hermann, 1912)
- Hybozelodes lucidus (Hermann, 1912)
- Hybozelodes marginatus (Osten-Sacken, 1887)
- Hybozelodes nigellus (Hermann, 1912)
- Hybozelodes pennatus (Hermann, 1912)
- Hybozelodes pictus (Hermann, 1912)
- Hybozelodes platycerus (Hermann, 1912)

=== Genus Hynirhynchus ===
- Hynirhynchus pantherinus (Bigot, 1879)
- Hynirhynchus zebra (Lindner, 1955)

=== Genus Hypenetes ===
- Hypenetes aconcaguanus (Artigas & Lewis & Parra, 2005)
- Hypenetes aegialodes (Londt, 1985)
- Hypenetes angulatus (Artigas & Lewis & Parra, 2005)
- Hypenetes argothrix (Londt, 1985)
- Hypenetes asiliformis (Wulp, 1882)
- Hypenetes critesi Artigas, 1970
- Hypenetes cryodes (Londt, 1985)
- Hypenetes davidsoni Artigas, 1970
- Hypenetes dicranus (Londt, 1985)
- Hypenetes digitatus Artigas, 1970
- Hypenetes dorattina (Londt, 1985)
- Hypenetes fucosoides (Artigas & Lewis & Parra, 2005)
- Hypenetes fucosus Artigas, 1970
- Hypenetes galactodes (Oldroyd, 1974)
- Hypenetes greatheadi (Oldroyd, 1974)
- Hypenetes grisescens (Engel, 1929)
- Hypenetes hessei (Londt, 1985)
- Hypenetes huasquinus (Artigas & Lewis & Parra, 2005)
- Hypenetes irwini (Oldroyd, 1974)
- Hypenetes leucoptera (Artigas & Lewis & Parra, 2005)
- Hypenetes leucotrica (Artigas & Lewis & Parra, 2005)
- Hypenetes loewi (Londt, 1985)
- Hypenetes macrocerus (Londt, 1985)
- Hypenetes magellanicus Artigas, 1970
- Hypenetes miles (Oldroyd, 1974)
- Hypenetes morosus (Oldroyd, 1974)
- Hypenetes nahuelbutae (Artigas & Lewis & Parra, 2005)
- Hypenetes obtusus (Engel, 1929)
- Hypenetes oldroydi (Londt, 1985)
- Hypenetes purpureus (Artigas & Lewis & Parra, 2005)
- Hypenetes pylochrysites (Londt, 1985)
- Hypenetes rexi (Londt, 1985)
- Hypenetes rotundus (Oldroyd, 1974)
- Hypenetes schineri Artigas, 1970
- Hypenetes spinipes (Artigas & Lewis & Parra, 2005)
- Hypenetes stigmatias Loew, 1858
- Hypenetes stuckenbergi (Londt, 1985)
- Hypenetes sturmias (Oldroyd, 1974)
- Hypenetes tregualemuensis (Artigas & Lewis & Parra, 2005)
- Hypenetes turneri (Londt, 1985)
- Hypenetes valentinei Artigas, 1970

=== Genus Hyperechia ===
- Hyperechia albifasciata (Enderlein, 1930)
- Hyperechia bomboides (Loew, 1851)
- Hyperechia fera (Wulp, 1872)
- Hyperechia floccosa (Bezzi, 1908)
- Hyperechia fuelleborni (Grünberg, 1907)
- Hyperechia hirtipes (Fabricius, 1805)
- Hyperechia imitator (Grünberg, 1907)
- Hyperechia marshalli (Austen, 1902)
- Hyperechia nigripennis (Wiedemann, 1830)
- Hyperechia nigrita (Grünberg, 1907)
- Hyperechia pellitiventris (Enderlein, 1930)
- Hyperechia xylocopiformis (Walker, 1849)

=== Genus Hystrichopogon ===
- Hystrichopogon hirticeps (Hermann, 1906)
