= Heteropogon =

Heteropogon may refer to:

- Heteropogon (plant), genus of tussock grass in the family Poaceae
- Heteropogon (fly), genus of robber flies in the family Asilidae
