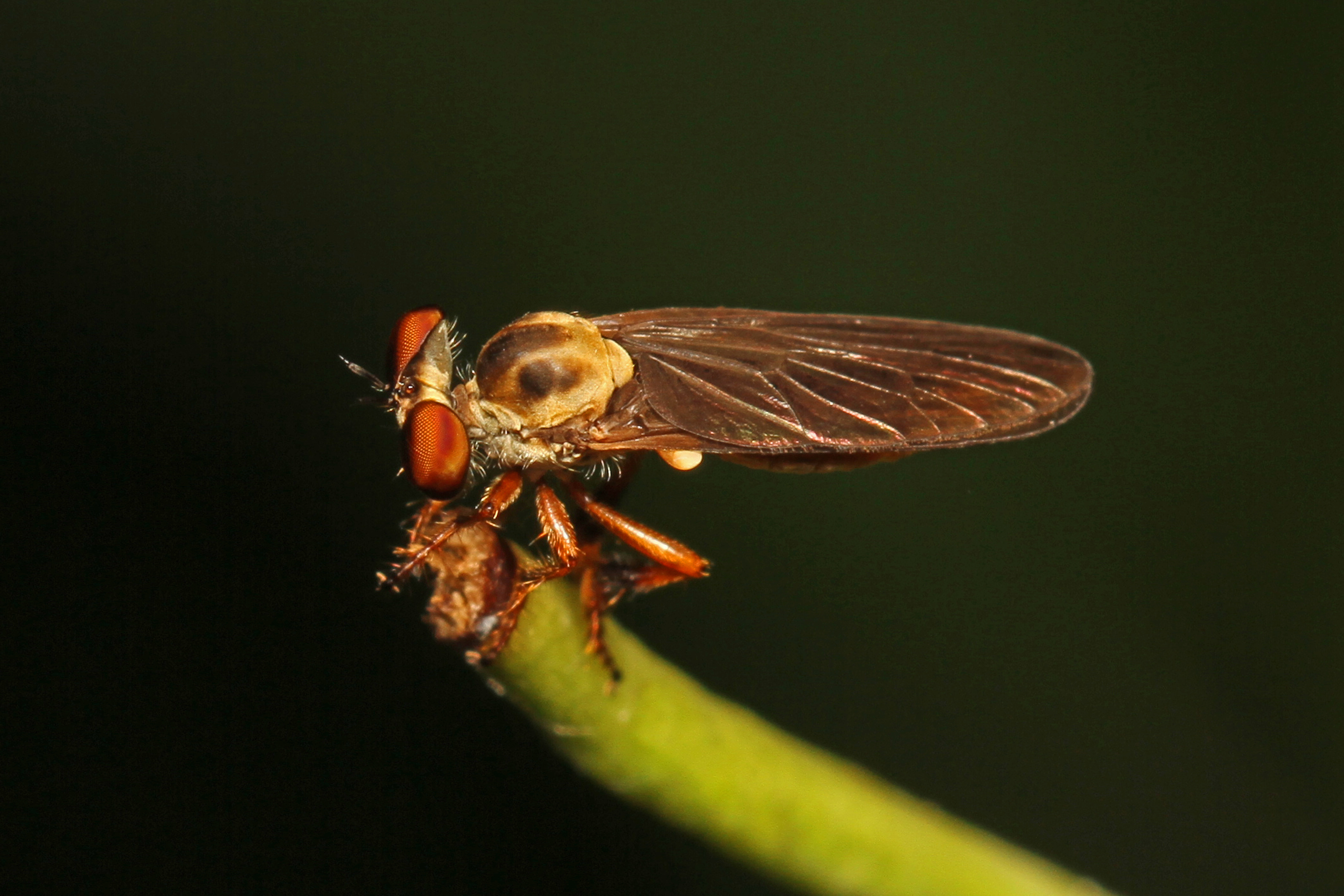

Scientific classification
- Domain: Eukaryota
- Kingdom: Animalia
- Phylum: Arthropoda
- Class: Insecta
- Order: Diptera
- Family: Asilidae
- Genus: Holcocephala
- Species: H. abdominalis

Binomial name
- Holcocephala abdominalis (Say, 1823)

Synonyms
- Dasyopogon abdominalis Say, 1823; Dasypogon aeta Walker, 1849; Dasypogon laticeps Wulp, 1867; Discocephala rufiventris Macquart, 1838

= Holcocephala abdominalis =

Species of fly

Holcocephala abdominalis is a species of robber fly in the family Asilidae.
