= Holopogon phaeonotus =

Scientific classification
- Domain: Eukaryota
- Kingdom: Animalia
- Phylum: Arthropoda
- Class: Insecta
- Order: Diptera
- Family: Asilidae
- Genus: Holopogon
- Species: H. phaeonotus

Binomial name
- Holopogon phaeonotus Loew, 1874

Synonyms
- Holopogon tibialis Curran, 1923

Species of fly

Holopogon phaeonotus is a species of robber flies in the family Asilidae.
