= Holopogon (fly) =

Scientific classification
- Kingdom: Animalia
- Phylum: Arthropoda
- Class: Insecta
- Order: Diptera
- Family: Asilidae
- Tribe: Stenopogonini
- Genus: Holopogon; Loew, 473

Genus of flies

Holopogon is a genus of robber flies in the family Asilidae. There are at least 60 described species in Holopogon.

== Species ==
These 67 species belong to the genus Holopogon:

- Holopogon acropennis Martin, 1959^{i c g}
- Holopogon albipilosus Curran, 1923^{i c g}
- Holopogon albosetosus Schiner, 1867^{c g}
- Holopogon angustifacies Lehr, 1972^{c g}
- Holopogon appendiculatum (Bigot, 1878)^{c g}
- Holopogon atrifrons Cole, 1924^{i c g}
- Holopogon atripennis Back, 1909^{i c g}
- Holopogon auribarbis (Meigen, 1820)^{c g}
- Holopogon avor Lehr, 1972^{c g}
- Holopogon binotatus Loew, 1870^{c g}
- Holopogon brunnipes (Meigen, 1820)^{c g}
- Holopogon bullatus Wulp, 1882^{c g}
- Holopogon caesariatus Martin, 1959^{i c g}
- Holopogon chalcogaster (Dufour, 1850)^{c g}
- Holopogon claripennis (Loew, 1856)^{c g}
- Holopogon cognatus Richter, 1964^{c g}
- Holopogon cornutus Theodor, 1980^{c g}
- Holopogon crinitus Martin, 1959^{i c g}
- Holopogon currani Martin, 1959^{i c g}
- Holopogon dichromatopus Bezzi, 1926^{c g}
- Holopogon dimidiatus (Meigen, 1820)^{c g}
- Holopogon dolicharista Lehr, 1972^{c g}
- Holopogon dusmetii Strobl, 1909^{c g}
- Holopogon fisheri Martin, 1967^{c g}
- Holopogon flavescens Jaennicke, 1867^{c g}
- Holopogon flavotibialis Strobl, 1909^{c g}
- Holopogon fugax Loew, 1858^{c g}
- Holopogon fumipennis (Meigen, 1820)^{c g}
- Holopogon guttulus (Wiedemann, 1821)^{i c g}
- Holopogon imbecillus Loew, 1871^{c g}
- Holopogon japonicus Nagatomi, 1983^{c g}
- Holopogon kirgizorum Peck, 1977^{c g}
- Holopogon kirtshenkoi Lehr, 1972^{c g}
- Holopogon kugleri Theodor, 1980^{c g}
- Holopogon melaleucus (Meigen, 1820)^{c g}
- Holopogon melas (Dufour, 1852)^{c g}
- Holopogon mica Martin, 1967^{i c g b}
- Holopogon mingusae Martin, 1959^{i c g}
- Holopogon negrus Lehr, 1972^{c g}
- Holopogon ni Tomasovic, 2006^{c g}
- Holopogon nigrifacies Bezzi, 1900^{c g}
- Holopogon nigripennis (Meigen, 1820)^{c g}
- Holopogon nigropilosus Theodor, 1980^{c g}
- Holopogon nitidiventris (Bigot, 1878)^{c g}
- Holopogon nitidus (Macquart, 1849)^{c g}
- Holopogon niveoscutum Hull, 1967^{c g}
- Holopogon nobilis Loew, 1869^{c g}
- Holopogon oriens Martin, 1959^{i c g b}
- Holopogon phaeonotus Loew, 1874^{i c g b}
- Holopogon priscus (Meigen, 1820)^{c g}
- Holopogon pulcher Williston, 1901^{c g}
- Holopogon pusillus (Macquart, 1838)^{c g}
- Holopogon quadrinotatus Seguy, 1953^{c g}
- Holopogon rugiventris Strobl, 1906^{c g}
- Holopogon sapphirus Martin, 1967^{i c g}
- Holopogon seniculus Loew, 1866^{i c g b}
- Holopogon siculus (Macquart, 1834)^{c g}
- Holopogon snowi Back, 1909^{i c g b}
- Holopogon stellatus Martin, 1959^{i c g}
- Holopogon tenerum Bigot, 1878^{c g}
- Holopogon tomentosus Oldroyd, 1974^{c g}
- Holopogon turkmenicus Lehr, 1972^{c g}
- Holopogon umbrinus Back, 1909^{i c g}
- Holopogon venustus (Rossi, 1790)^{c g}
- Holopogon vockerothi Martin, 1959^{i c g}
- Holopogon vumba Oldroyd, 1974^{c g}
- Holopogon wilcoxi Martin, 1959^{i c g b}

Data sources: i = ITIS, c = Catalogue of Life, g = GBIF, b = Bugguide.net
