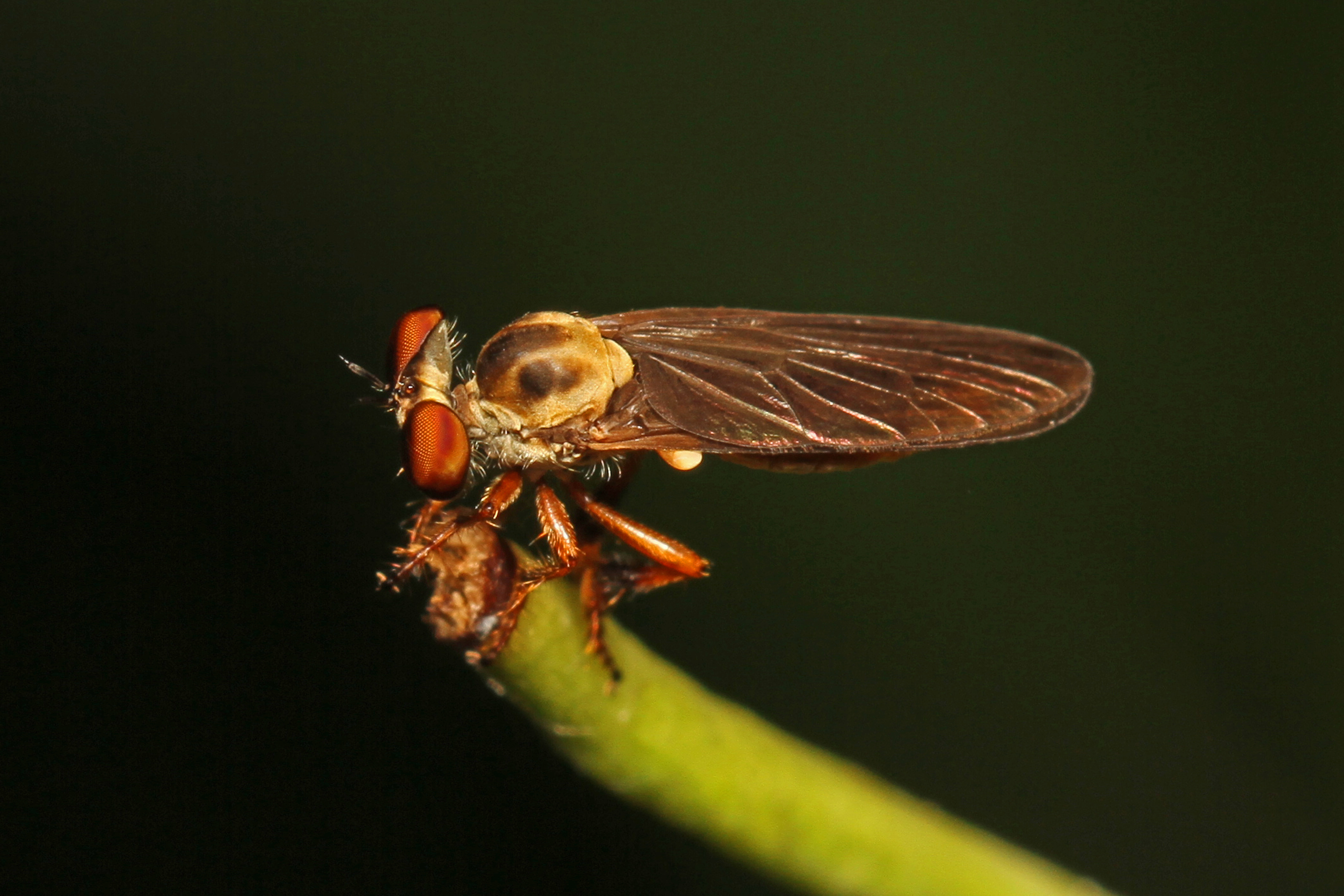
- Holcocephala abdominalis

Scientific classification
- Domain: Eukaryota
- Kingdom: Animalia
- Phylum: Arthropoda
- Class: Insecta
- Order: Diptera
- Family: Asilidae
- Tribe: Damalini
- Genus: Holcocephala

= Holcocephala =

Genus of flies

Holcocephala is a genus of robber flies in the family Asilidae. There are at least 40 described species in Holcocephala.

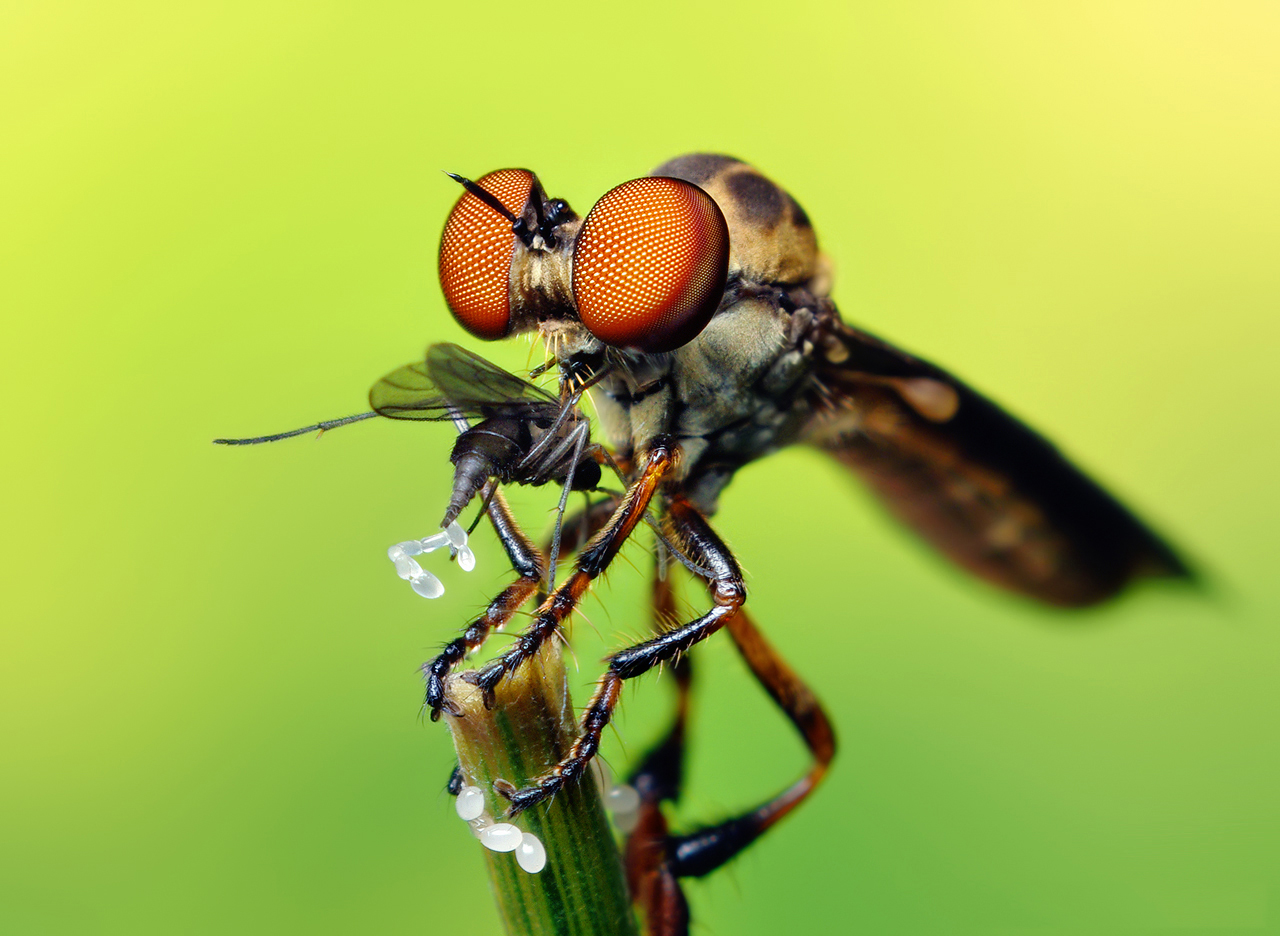
Holcocephala fusca

== Species ==
These 40 species belong to the genus Holcocephala:

- Holcocephala abdominalis (Say, 1823)^{i c g b}
- Holcocephala affinis Bellardi, 1861^{c g}
- Holcocephala agalla Walker, 1849^{c g}
- Holcocephala analis (Macquart, 1846)^{c}
- Holcocephala bechyneorum Ayala, 1982^{c g}
- Holcocephala calva (Loew, 1872)^{i c g b}
- Holcocephala coriacea (Wiedemann, 1821)^{c g}
- Holcocephala curvicosta Carrera, 1958^{c g}
- Holcocephala deltoidea (Bellardi, 1861)^{c g}
- Holcocephala dimidiata Hermann, 1924^{c g}
- Holcocephala divisa (Walker, 1860)^{c}
- Holcocephala fernandezi Ayala, 1982^{c g}
- Holcocephala fimbriata Hermann, 1924^{c g}
- Holcocephala fusca Bromley, 1951^{i c g b}
- Holcocephala indigena Scarbrough & Perez-Gelabert, 2006^{c g}
- Holcocephala inornata (Rondani, 1848)^{c g}
- Holcocephala luteipes Hermann, 1924^{c g}
- Holcocephala macula (Rondani, 1848)^{c g}
- Holcocephala matteii Ayala, 1982^{c g}
- Holcocephala minuta (Bellardi, 1861)^{c g}
- Holcocephala mogiana Carrera, 1955^{c g}
- Holcocephala monticola Ayala, 1982^{c g}
- Holcocephala nigrita (Fabricius, 1805)^{c g}
- Holcocephala nitida (Wiedemann, 1830)^{c}
- Holcocephala nodosipes (Enderlein, 1914)^{c g}
- Holcocephala obscuripennis Enderlein, 1914^{c g}
- Holcocephala oculata (Fabricius, 1805)^{c g}
- Holcocephala pardalina Hermann, 1924^{c g}
- Holcocephala pectinata Carrera, 1955^{c g}
- Holcocephala pennipes Hermann, 1924^{c g}
- Holcocephala peruviana Hermann, 1924^{c g}
- Holcocephala rufithorax (Wiedemann, 1828)^{c g}
- Holcocephala scopifer (Schiner, 1868)^{c}
- Holcocephala spinipes Hermann, 1924^{c g}
- Holcocephala stylata Pritchard, 1938^{c g}
- Holcocephala tijucana (Carrera, 1958)^{c g}
- Holcocephala uruguayensis Lynch Arribalzaga, 1882^{c g}
- Holcocephala vallestris Ayala, 1982^{c g}
- Holcocephala vicina (Macquart, 1838)^{c}
- Holcocephala vittata (Walker, 1836)^{c g}

Data sources: i = ITIS, c = Catalogue of Life, g = GBIF, b = Bugguide.net
