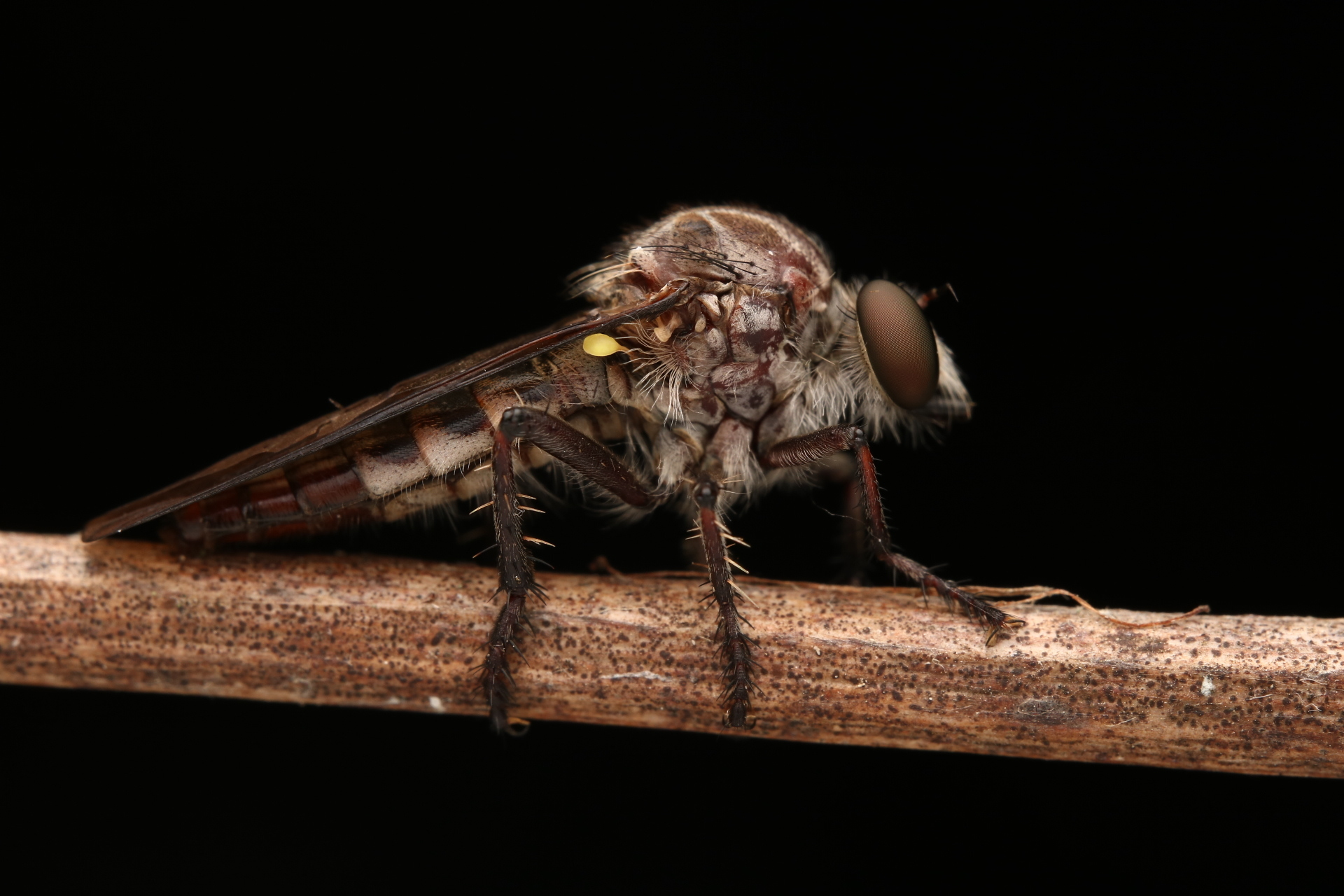

Scientific classification
- Kingdom: Animalia
- Phylum: Arthropoda
- Class: Insecta
- Order: Diptera
- Family: Asilidae
- Genus: Heteropogon
- Species: H. macerinus

Binomial name
- Heteropogon macerinus (Walker, 1849)

Synonyms
- Dasypogon macerinus Walker, 1849; Heteropogon gibbus Loew, 1866

= Heteropogon macerinus =

Species of fly

Heteropogon macerinus is a species of robber fly in the family Asilidae.
