= Holopogon wilcoxi =

Scientific classification
- Domain: Eukaryota
- Kingdom: Animalia
- Phylum: Arthropoda
- Class: Insecta
- Order: Diptera
- Family: Asilidae
- Genus: Holopogon
- Species: H. wilcoxi

Binomial name
- Holopogon wilcoxi Martin, 1959

Species of fly

Holopogon wilcoxi is a species of robber flies in the family Asilidae.
