= Heteropogon spatulatus =

Scientific classification
- Domain: Eukaryota
- Kingdom: Animalia
- Phylum: Arthropoda
- Class: Insecta
- Order: Diptera
- Family: Asilidae
- Genus: Heteropogon
- Species: H. spatulatus

Binomial name
- Heteropogon spatulatus Pritchard, 1935

Species of fly

Heteropogon spatulatus is a species of robber flies in the family Asilidae.
