= Heteropogon cirrhatus =

Scientific classification
- Domain: Eukaryota
- Kingdom: Animalia
- Phylum: Arthropoda
- Class: Insecta
- Order: Diptera
- Family: Asilidae
- Genus: Heteropogon
- Species: H. cirrhatus

Binomial name
- Heteropogon cirrhatus (Osten Sacken, 1877)

Synonyms
- Pycnopogon cirrhatus Osten Sacken, 1877

Species of fly

Heteropogon cirrhatus is a species of robber flies in the family Asilidae.
