= Holopogon mica =

Scientific classification
- Domain: Eukaryota
- Kingdom: Animalia
- Phylum: Arthropoda
- Class: Insecta
- Order: Diptera
- Family: Asilidae
- Genus: Holopogon
- Species: H. mica

Binomial name
- Holopogon mica Martin, 1967

Species of fly

Holopogon mica is a species of robber flies in the family Asilidae.
