= Holopogon snowi =

Scientific classification
- Domain: Eukaryota
- Kingdom: Animalia
- Phylum: Arthropoda
- Class: Insecta
- Order: Diptera
- Family: Asilidae
- Genus: Holopogon
- Species: H. snowi

Binomial name
- Holopogon snowi Back, 1909

Species of fly

Holopogon snowi is a species of robber flies in the family Asilidae.
