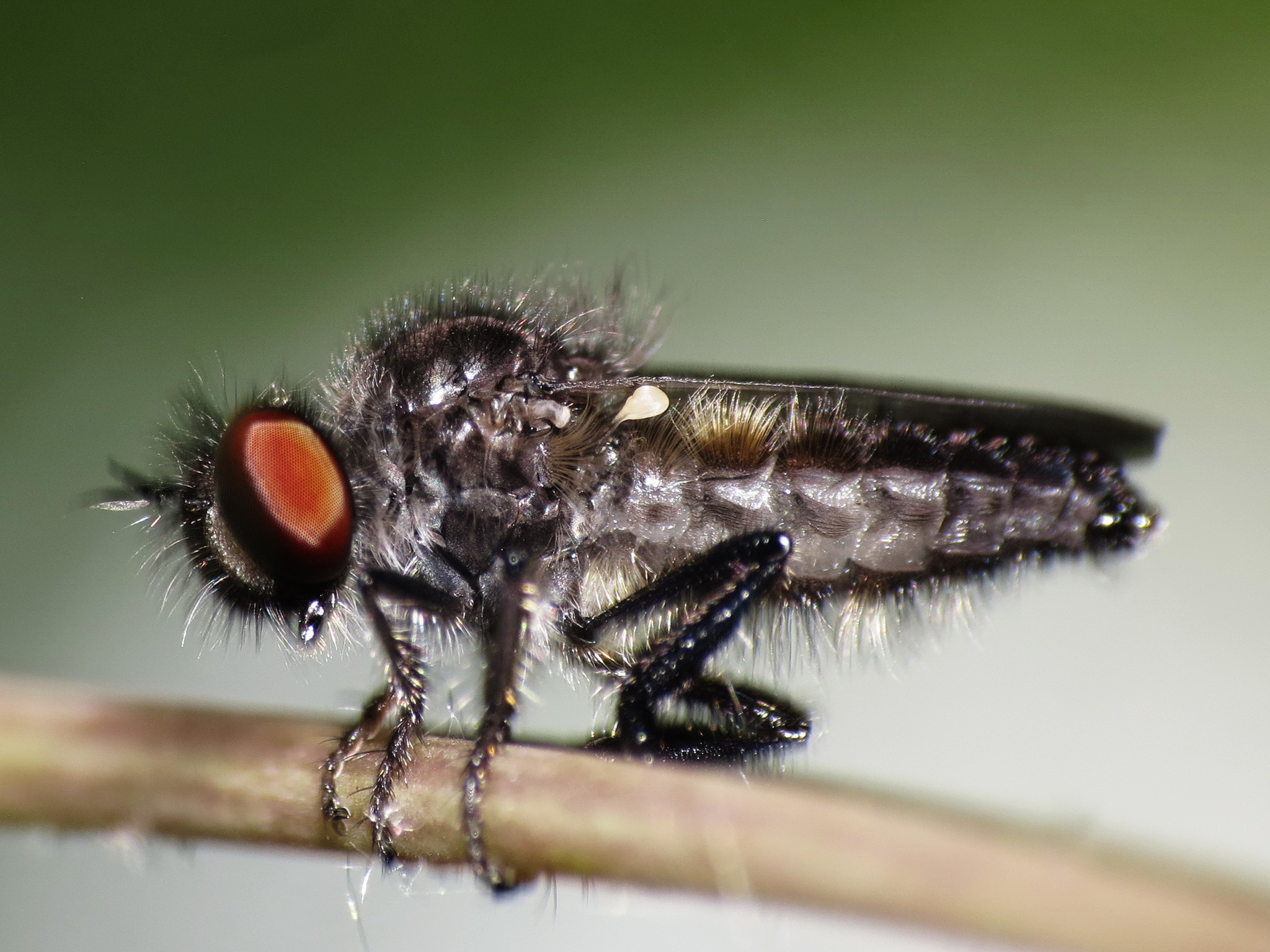

Scientific classification
- Domain: Eukaryota
- Kingdom: Animalia
- Phylum: Arthropoda
- Class: Insecta
- Order: Diptera
- Family: Asilidae
- Genus: Holopogon
- Species: H. oriens

Binomial name
- Holopogon oriens Martin, 1959

= Holopogon oriens =

Species of fly

Holopogon oriens is a species of robber fly in the family Asilidae.
