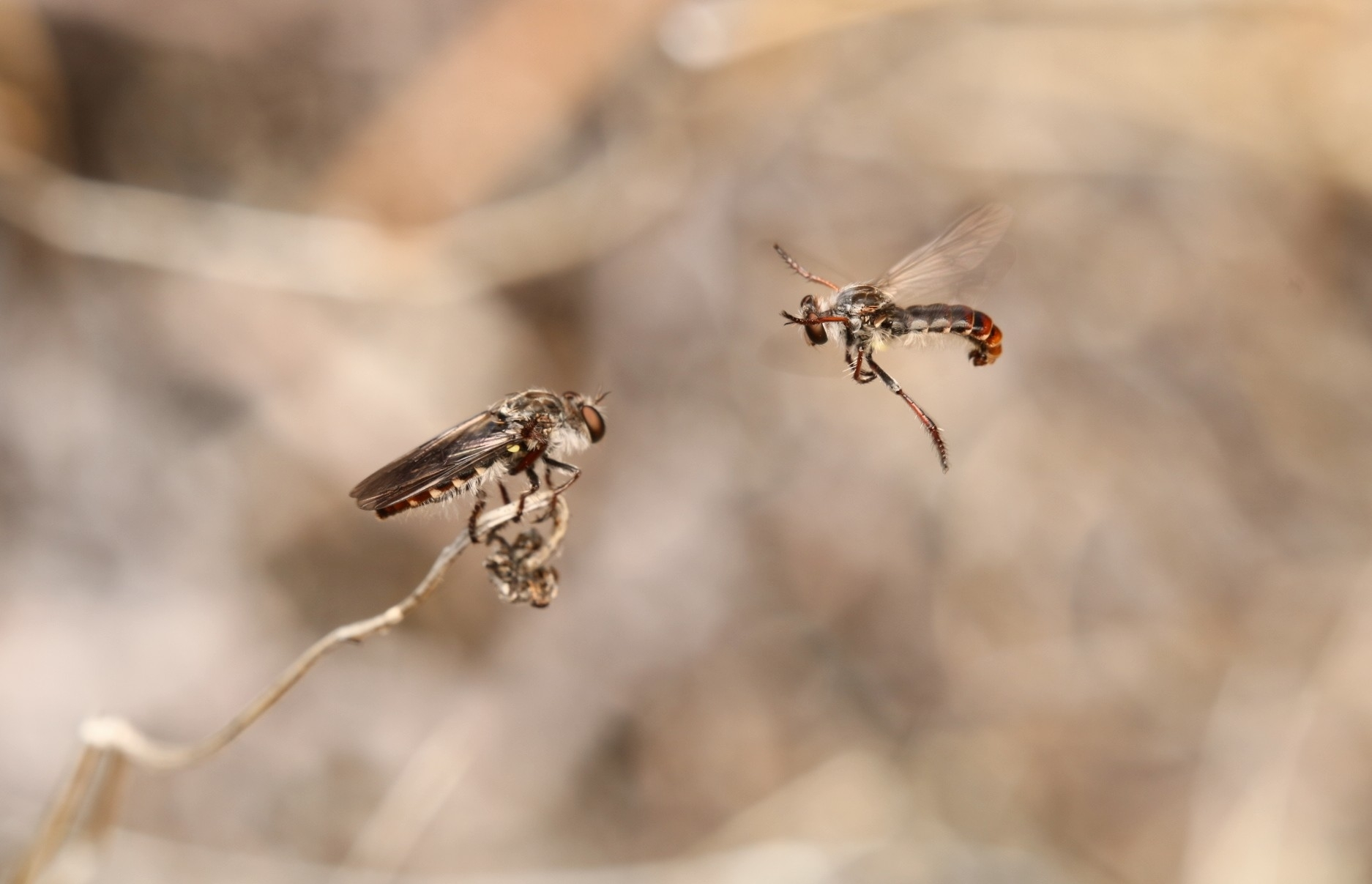
- Performing a courtship dance

Scientific classification
- Domain: Eukaryota
- Kingdom: Animalia
- Phylum: Arthropoda
- Class: Insecta
- Order: Diptera
- Family: Asilidae
- Genus: Heteropogon
- Species: H. duncani

Binomial name
- Heteropogon duncani Wilcox, 1941

= Heteropogon duncani =

Species of fly

Heteropogon duncani is a species of robber flies in the family Asilidae.
