= Heteropogon (fly) =

Scientific classification
- Kingdom: Animalia
- Phylum: Arthropoda
- Class: Insecta
- Order: Diptera
- Family: Asilidae
- Genus: Heteropogon

Genus of flies

Heteropogon is a genus of robber flies in the family Asilidae. There are at least 60 described species in Heteropogon.

== Species ==
- Heteropogon alter Becker, 1915
- Heteropogon arizonensis Wilcox, 1941
- Heteropogon asiaticus (Oldroyd, 1963)
- Heteropogon aureus Becker, 1907
- Heteropogon aurocinctus Seguy, 1934
- Heteropogon biplex Becker & Stein, 1913
- Heteropogon capensis Lindner, 1961
- Heteropogon cazieri Wilcox, 1965
- Heteropogon chiricahua Wilcox, 1965
- Heteropogon cirrhatus (Osten Sacken, 1877)
- Heteropogon currani Pritchard, 1935
- Heteropogon davisi Wilcox, 1965
- Heteropogon dejectus (Williston, 1901)
- Heteropogon divisus (Coquillett, 1902)
- Heteropogon dorothyae Martin, 1962
- Heteropogon duncani Wilcox, 1941
- Heteropogon eburnus (Walker, 1849)
- Heteropogon elegans Becker, 1907
- Heteropogon filicornis (Loew, 1871)
- Heteropogon fisheri Wilcox, 1965
- Heteropogon flavidus Lindner, 1973
- Heteropogon flavobarbatus Becker, 1907
- Heteropogon gracilis Engel & Cuthbertson, 1937
- Heteropogon hermanni (Engel, 1930)
- Heteropogon holcocephaloides Lindner, 1955
- Heteropogon johnsoni (Back, 1904)
- Heteropogon lautus Loew, 1872
- Heteropogon lehri Richter, 1968
- Heteropogon loewi Lehr, 1970
- Heteropogon ludius (Coquillett, 1893)
- Heteropogon lugubris Hermann, 1906
- Heteropogon macerinus (Walker, 1849)
- Heteropogon maculinervis James, 1937
- Heteropogon manicatus (Meigen, 1820)
- Heteropogon manni Loew, 1854
- Heteropogon martini Wilcox, 1965
- Heteropogon mesasiaticus Lehr, 1970
- Heteropogon nitidus Oldroyd, 1964
- Heteropogon nubilus (Wiedemann, 1820)
- Heteropogon oldroydi Lindner, 1973
- Heteropogon ornatipes Loew, 1851
- Heteropogon palestinensis Theodor, 1980
- Heteropogon patruelis (Coquillett, 1893)
- Heteropogon paurosomus Pritchard, 1935
- Heteropogon peregrinus Engel, 1929
- Heteropogon phalna (Walker, 1849)
- Heteropogon phoenicurus Loew, 1872
- Heteropogon pilosus Lehr, 1970
- Heteropogon pyrinus Hermann, 1906
- Heteropogon rejectus Williston, 1901
- Heteropogon rubidus (Coquillett, 1893)
- Heteropogon rubigipennis (Macquart, 1849)
- Heteropogon rubrifasciatus Bromley, 1931
- Heteropogon scoparius Loew, 1847
- Heteropogon senilis (Bigot, 1878)
- Heteropogon spatulatus Pritchard, 1935
- Heteropogon stonei Wilcox, 1965
- Heteropogon succinctus Loew, 1847
- Heteropogon timondavidi Tsacas, 1970
- Heteropogon tolandi Wilcox, 1965
- Heteropogon waltlii (Meigen, 1838)
- Heteropogon wilcoxi James, 1934
- Heteropogon willistoni Martin, 1962
