= Heteropogon phoenicurus =

Scientific classification
- Domain: Eukaryota
- Kingdom: Animalia
- Phylum: Arthropoda
- Class: Insecta
- Order: Diptera
- Family: Asilidae
- Genus: Heteropogon
- Species: H. phoenicurus

Binomial name
- Heteropogon phoenicurus Loew, 1872

Species of fly

Heteropogon phoenicurus is a species of robber flies in the family Asilidae.
