= Holcocephala calva =

Scientific classification
- Domain: Eukaryota
- Kingdom: Animalia
- Phylum: Arthropoda
- Class: Insecta
- Order: Diptera
- Family: Asilidae
- Genus: Holcocephala
- Species: H. calva

Binomial name
- Holcocephala calva (Loew, 1872)

Synonyms
- Discocephala calva Loew, 1872

Species of fly

Holcocephala calva is a species of robber fly in the family Asilidae.

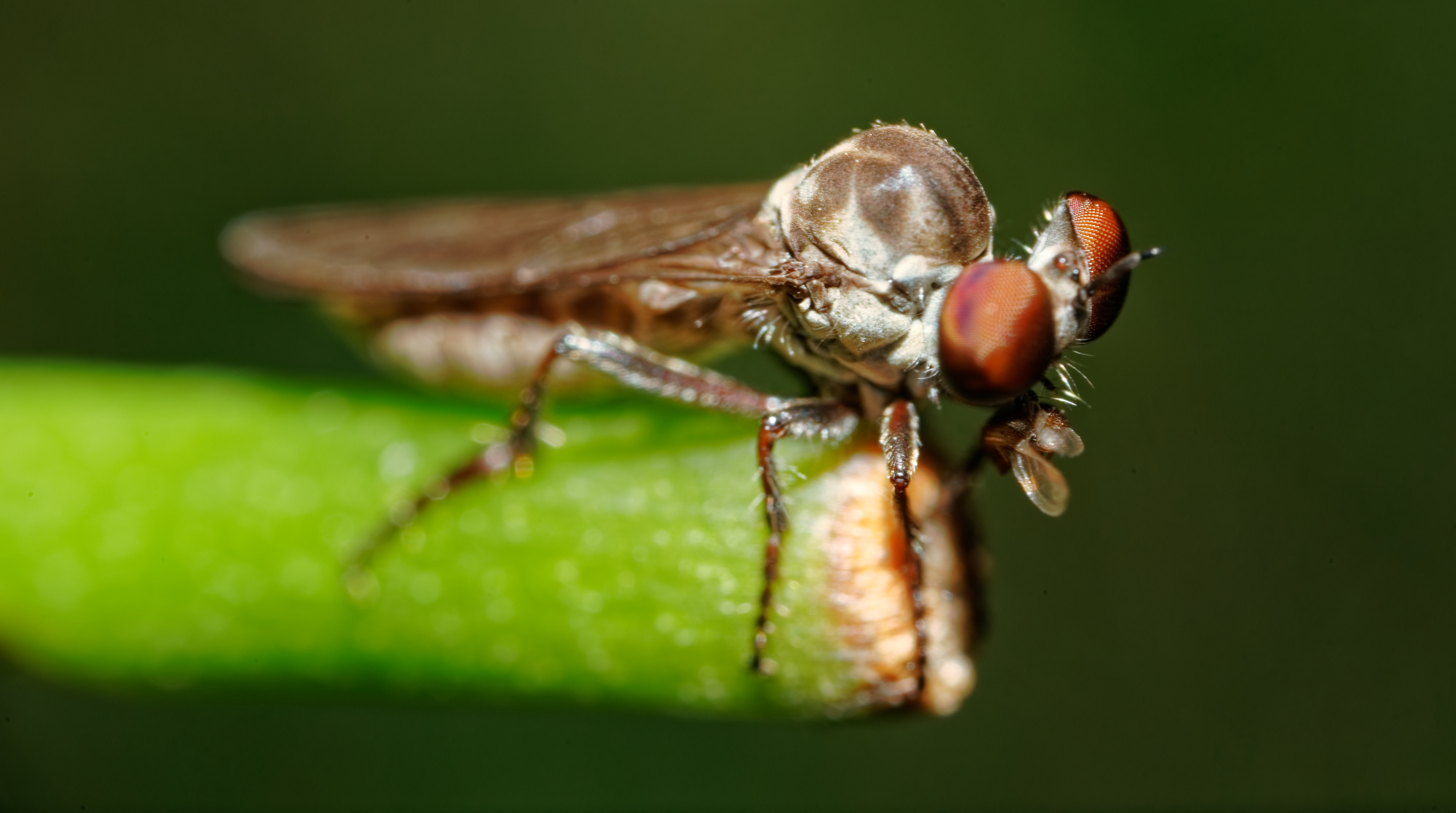
Holcocephala calva
