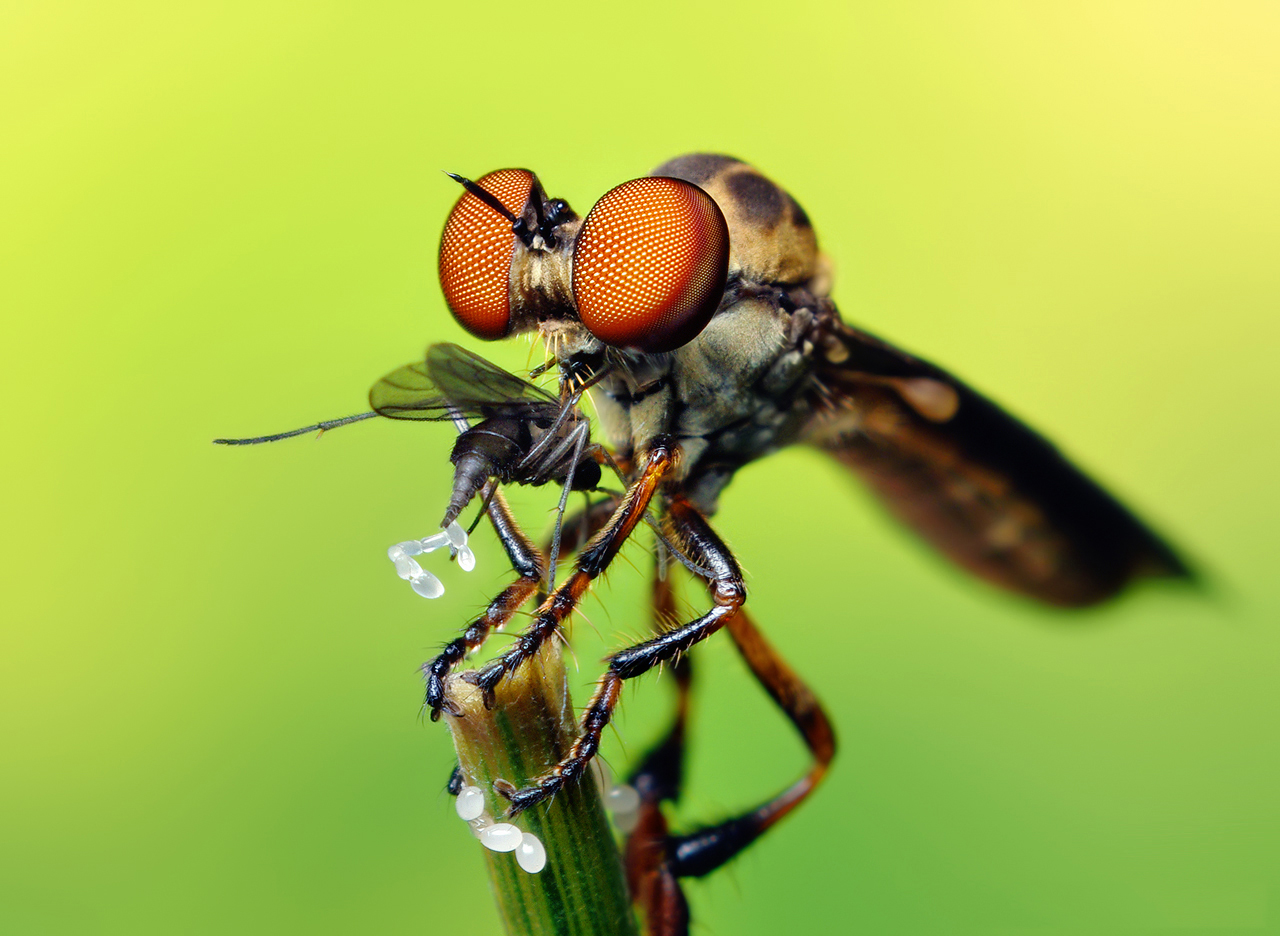
- H. fusca with prey

Scientific classification
- Domain: Eukaryota
- Kingdom: Animalia
- Phylum: Arthropoda
- Class: Insecta
- Order: Diptera
- Family: Asilidae
- Genus: Holcocephala
- Species: H. fusca

Binomial name
- Holcocephala fusca Bromley, 1951

= Holcocephala fusca =

Species of fly

Holcocephala fusca, the gnat ogre, is a species of robber fly in the family Asilidae.
