= Heteropogon patruelis =

Scientific classification
- Domain: Eukaryota
- Kingdom: Animalia
- Phylum: Arthropoda
- Class: Insecta
- Order: Diptera
- Family: Asilidae
- Genus: Heteropogon
- Species: H. patruelis

Binomial name
- Heteropogon patruelis (Coquillett, 1893)

Synonyms
- Anisopogon patruelis Coquillett, 1893

Species of fly

Heteropogon patruelis is a species of robber flies in the family Asilidae.
