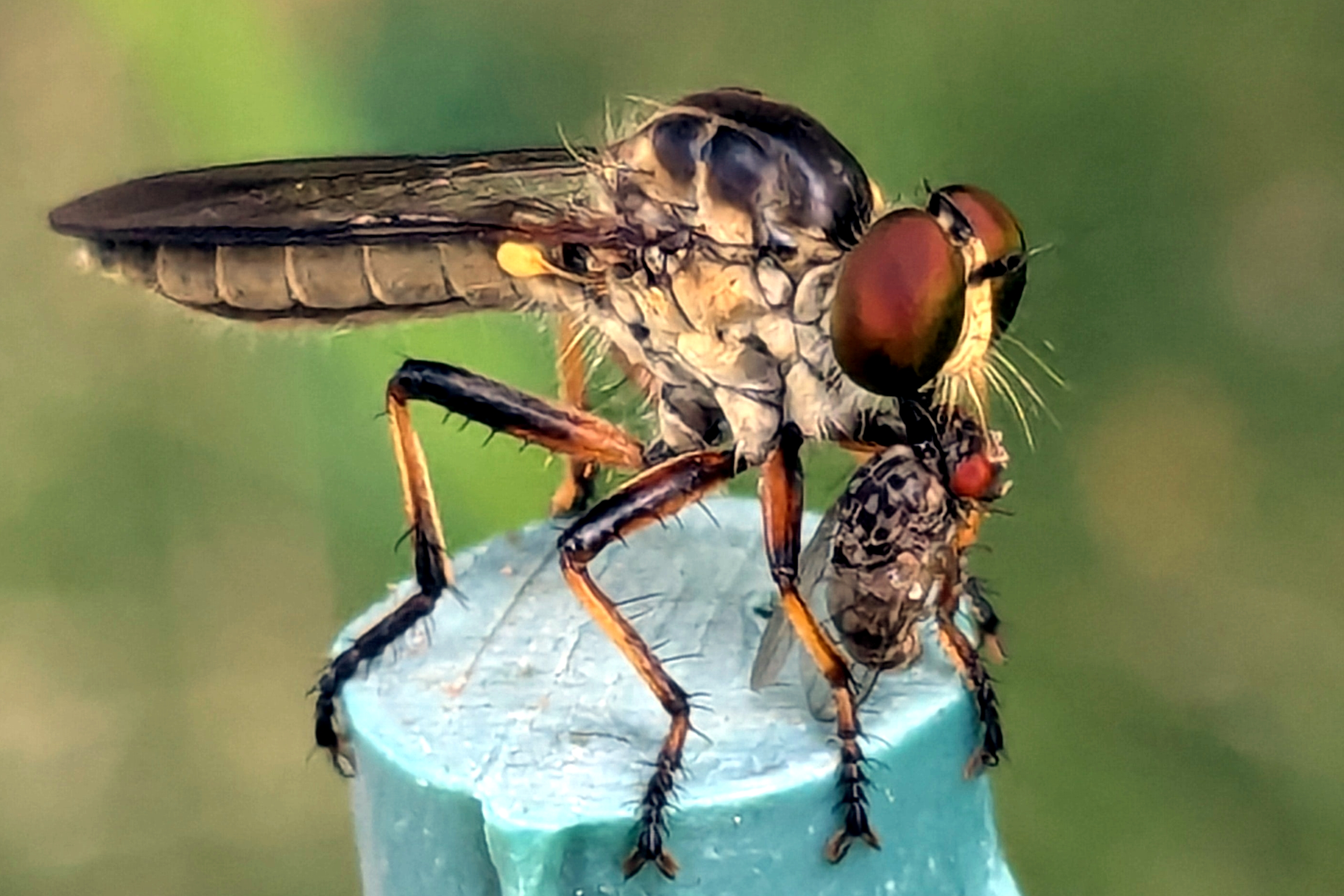
- Ommatius tibialis specimen with fly prey after a hunt

Scientific classification
- Kingdom: Animalia
- Phylum: Arthropoda
- Clade: Pancrustacea
- Class: Insecta
- Order: Diptera
- Family: Asilidae
- Genus: Ommatius
- Species: O. tibialis

Binomial name
- Ommatius tibialis (Say, 1823)

Synonyms
- Ommatus tibialis Say, 1823

= Ommatius tibialis =

Species of fly

Ommatius tibialis is a species of robber fly in the family Asilidae.
