= Ommatius baboquivari =

Scientific classification
- Kingdom: Animalia
- Phylum: Arthropoda
- Class: Insecta
- Order: Diptera
- Family: Asilidae
- Genus: Ommatius
- Species: O. baboquivari

Binomial name
- Ommatius baboquivari Wilcox, 1936

Species of fly

Ommatius baboquivari is a species of robber flies in the family Asilidae.
