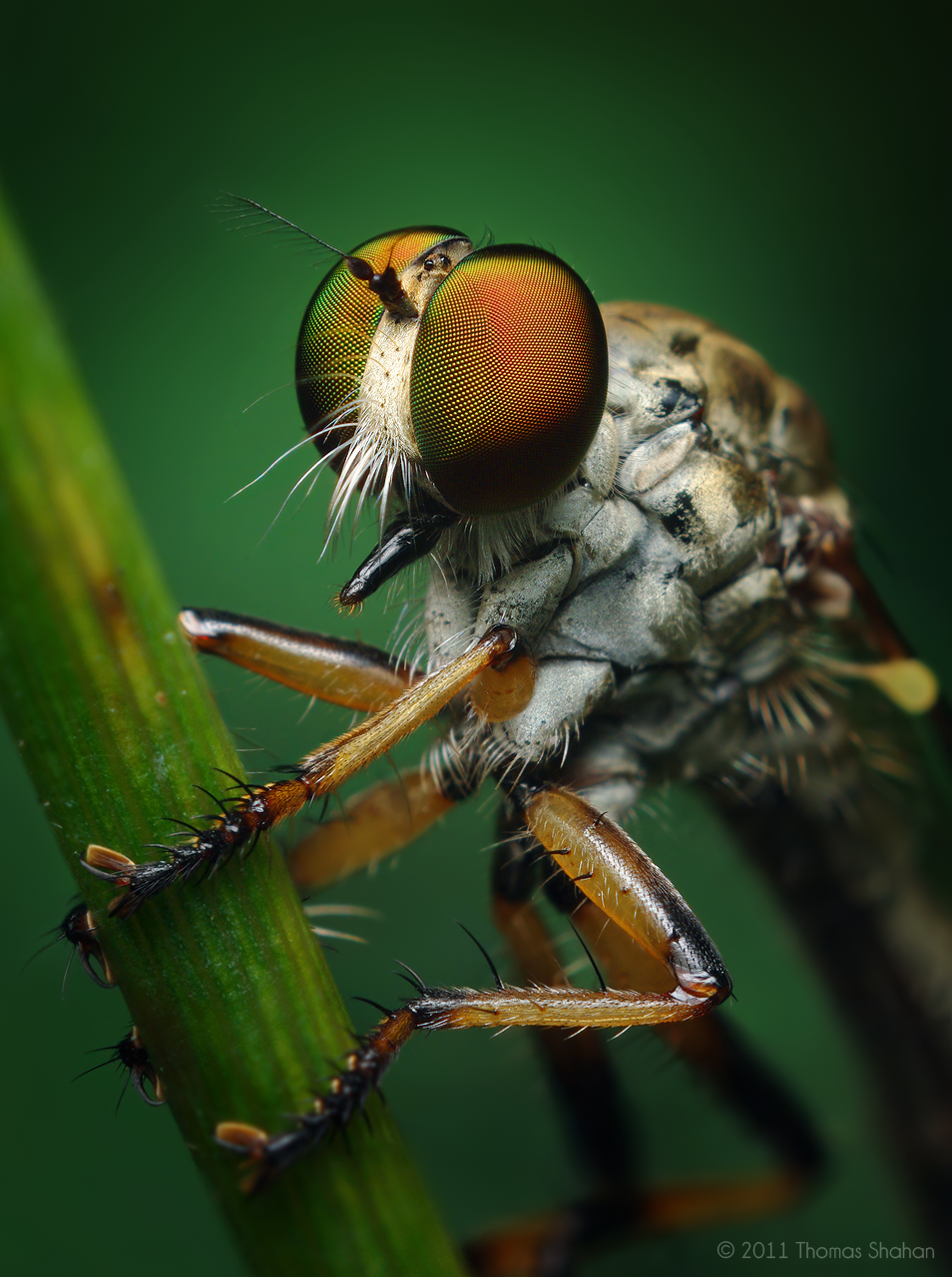
- Ommatius female

Scientific classification
- Kingdom: Animalia
- Phylum: Arthropoda
- Clade: Pancrustacea
- Class: Insecta
- Order: Diptera
- Family: Asilidae
- Subfamily: Asilinae
- Genus: Ommatius; Wiedemann, 1821

Species
- Many, see text

= Ommatius =

Genus of flies

Ommatius is a genus of robber flies. It is part of the subfamily Asilinae, containing the following species:

- Ommatius abana Curran, 1953
- Ommatius abdelkuriensis Scarbrough, 2002
- Ommatius achaetus Scarbrough, 1994
- Ommatius acornutus Scarbrough, Marasci & Hill, 2003
- Ommatius acutus Scarbrough, 1990
- Ommatius aegyptius Efflatoun, 1934
- Ommatius aequalis (Becker, 1925)
- Ommatius albovittatus Wiedemann, 1824
- Ommatius alexanderi Farr, 1965
- Ommatius alienus (Osten Sacken, 1882)
- Ommatius allopoecius Oldroyd, 1972
- Ommatius ampliatus Scarbrough, 2002
- Ommatius amula Curran, 1928
- Ommatius amurensis (Richter, 1960)
- Ommatius angulosus Scarbrough, 2002
- Ommatius angustatus Scarbrough, 2002
- Ommatius angustus Scarbrough, 2003
- Ommatius annulatus Bigot, 1887
- Ommatius annulitarsis Curran, 1927
- Ommatius apicalis (Bellardi, 1861)
- Ommatius argentatus Meijere, 1911
- Ommatius argyrochirus Wulp, 1872
- Ommatius aridus Scarbrough, 2002
- Ommatius aruensis Wulp, 1872
- Ommatius arunachalensis Joseph & Parui, 1983
- Ommatius ater Bromley, 1935
- Ommatius atrogaster Bigot, 1859
- Ommatius atrosus Scarbrough, 1997
- Ommatius auribarbis Wiedemann, 1828
- Ommatius ayalai Scarbrough, 2002
- Ommatius baboquivari Wilcox, 1936
- Ommatius bacchoides Walker, 1864
- Ommatius barbiellinii Curran, 1934
- Ommatius bastardoanus Scarbrough 2003
- Ommatius beameri Wilcox, 1936
- Ommatius bengalensis Joseph & Parui, 1987
- Ommatius bevisi Bromley, 1947
- Ommatius bicolor (Bigot, 1875)
- Ommatius bicolor Martin, 1964 (Homonym)
- Ommatius bifidus Martin, 1964
- Ommatius biharensis Joseph & Parui, 1987
- Ommatius bipartitus Scarbrough, 1985
- Ommatius biseriatus (Becker, 1925)
- Ommatius bromleyi Pritchard, 1935
- Ommatius bullatus Scarbrough, 2002
- Ommatius callidus Scarbrough, 2003
- Ommatius canicoxa Speiser, 1913
- Ommatius canus Walker, 1865
- Ommatius carbonarius Scarbrough, Marasci & Hill, 2003
- Ommatius carmichaeli Bromley, 1935
- Ommatius cassidea (Scarbrough & Marascia, 1999)
- Ommatius catus Scarbrough & Costantino, 2005
- Ommatius chiastoneurus Speiser, 1910
- Ommatius chrysopilus Oldroyd, 1972
- Ommatius cinnamomeus Scarbrough, 1984
- Ommatius cinthiae Vieira, Castro & Bravo, 2004
- Ommatius clava (Scarbrough & Marascia, 1999)
- Ommatius cnemideus Bigot, 1877
- Ommatius coeraebus Walker, 1849
- Ommatius compactus (Becker, 1925)
- Ommatius complanatus Scarbrough, 1994
- Ommatius concavus Martin, 1964
- Ommatius conciens Wulp, 1872
- Ommatius confusus Martin, 1964
- Ommatius conopsoides Wiedemann, 1828
- Ommatius constrictus Scarbrough, 2002
- Ommatius conus Scarbrough, 2002
- Ommatius cornutus Scarbrough, Marasci & Hill, 2003
- Ommatius costatus Rondani, 1850
- Ommatius crypticus Oldroyd, 1972
- Ommatius cubanus Scarbrough, 1985
- Ommatius curtus Scarbrough, Marasci & Hill, 2003
- Ommatius curvimargo (Bezzi, 1928)
- Ommatius curvipes Meijere, 1915
- Ommatius densus Martin, 1964
- Ommatius dentatus Scarbrough, 1994
- Ommatius depressus Scarbrough, 2002
- Ommatius despectus Wulp, 1872
- Ommatius destitutus Scarbrough, 2002
- Ommatius didymus Scarbrough, 1994
- Ommatius digitus Scarbrough, Marasci & Hill, 2003
- Ommatius dignus Scarbrough, 2000
- Ommatius dilatipennis Wulp, 1872
- Ommatius dimidiatus Macquart, 1850
- Ommatius dimidiatus Scarbrough, 1985 (Homonym)
- Ommatius discalis Walker, 1861
- Ommatius discus Martin, 1964
- Ommatius dispar Macquart, 1848
- Ommatius disparis Scarbrough, 2007
- Ommatius distinctus Ricardo, 1918
- Ommatius docimus Oldroyd, 1972
- Ommatius dolabriformis Scarbrough, 2002
- Ommatius dolon Oldroyd, 1972
- Ommatius dravidicus Joseph & Parui, 1983
- Ommatius dubius Joseph & Parui, 1987
- Ommatius elusivus Scarbrough, 2003
- Ommatius emarginatus Scarbrough, 1985
- Ommatius epipomus Oldroyd, 1972
- Ommatius episkeris Oldroyd, 1972
- Ommatius erythropus Schiner, 1867
- Ommatius erythropygus Curran, 1927
- Ommatius euplocus Oldroyd, 1972
- Ommatius excurrens Wulp, 1872
- Ommatius exilis Curran, 1928
- Ommatius falcatus Scarbrough, 1984
- Ommatius fallax Bigot, 1859
- Ommatius fanovana Bromley, 1942
- Ommatius femoratus Bigot, 1875
- Ommatius fernandezi Scarbrough, 2002
- Ommatius fimbriatus Hardy, 1949
- Ommatius fimbrillus Scarbrough, 2000
- Ommatius flavescens Scarbrough, 2003
- Ommatius flavicaudus Malloch, 1929
- Ommatius flavipennis Scarbrough, 2003
- Ommatius flavipes Macquart, 1834
- Ommatius flavipes Loew, 1858 (Homonym)
- Ommatius flavipyga (Becker, 1925)
- Ommatius flexus Scarbrough, 2002
- Ommatius floridensis Bullington & Lavigne, 1984
- Ommatius forticulus Scarbrough & Costantino, 2005
- Ommatius frauenfeldi Schiner, 1868
- Ommatius fulvimanus Wulp, 1872
- Ommatius furcinus Martin, 1964
- Ommatius fusciformis Becker, 1926
- Ommatius fuscipennis Bellardi, 1861
- Ommatius fuscus Joseph & Parui, 1985
- Ommatius fusiformis (Becker, 1926)
- Ommatius galba (Scarbrough & Marascia, 1999)
- Ommatius garambensis Oldroyd, 1970
- Ommatius geminus Martin, 1964
- Ommatius geminus Scarbrough & Perez-Gelabert, 2006 (Homonym)
- Ommatius gemma Brimley, 1928
- Ommatius genitalis Joseph & Parui, 1987
- Ommatius gladiatus Scarbrough, 2002
- Ommatius gopalpurensis Joseph & Parui, 1987
- Ommatius gracilis Walker, 1857
- Ommatius griseipennis (Becker, 1925)
- Ommatius gwenae Scarbrough, 1984
- Ommatius haemorrhoidalis Lindner, 1955
- Ommatius hageni (Meijere, 1911)
- Ommatius haitiensis Scarbrough, 1984
- Ommatius hanebrinki Scarbrough & Rutkauskas, 1983
- Ommatius harlequin Oldroyd, 1974
- Ommatius hecale Walker, 1849
- Ommatius hierroi Scarbrough, 2003
- Ommatius hispaniolae Scarbrough, 1984
- Ommatius hispidus Scarbrough, 1985
- Ommatius holosericeus Schiner, 1867
- Ommatius hradskyi Joseph & Parui, 1983
- Ommatius hulli Joseph & Parui, 1983
- Ommatius humatus Scarbrough, 1994
- Ommatius hyacinthinus (Bigot, 1877)
- Ommatius hyalinipennis Wulp, 1898
- Ommatius impeditus Wulp, 1872
- Ommatius imperator Oldroyd, 1939
- Ommatius incurvatus Scarbrough, 1994
- Ommatius indicus Joseph & Parui, 1983
- Ommatius infirmus Wulp, 1872
- Ommatius inflatus Scarbrough, 2003
- Ommatius infractus Scarbrough, 1985
- Ommatius infuscatus Scarbrough, 1990
- Ommatius insectatus Scarbrough & Costantino, 2005
- Ommatius insularis Wulp, 1872
- Ommatius integerrimus Scarbrough, 1990
- Ommatius invehens Walker, 1864
- Ommatius jabalpurensis Joseph & Parui, 1983
- Ommatius jamaicensis Farr, 1965
- Ommatius jonesi Joseph & Parui, 1985
- Ommatius kambangensis Meijere, 1914
- Ommatius kempi Joseph & Parui, 1983
- Ommatius kodaikanalensis Joseph & Parui, 1995
- Ommatius lambertoni Bromley, 1942
- Ommatius laticrus Scarbrough & Perez-Gelabert, 2006
- Ommatius lema Walker, 1849
- Ommatius leucopogon Wiedemann, 1824
- Ommatius lineatus Martin, 1964
- Ommatius lineolatus Scarbrough, 1988
- Ommatius litoreus Scarbrough & Marascia, 2003
- Ommatius lividipes Bigot, 1891
- Ommatius longiforceps Bromley, 1942
- Ommatius longinquus Martin, 1964
- Ommatius longipennis Lindner, 1955
- Ommatius lucidatus Scarbrough, 1997
- Ommatius lucifer Walker, 1858
- Ommatius lunatus Scarbrough, 2002
- Ommatius lurismus Oldroyd, 1968
- Ommatius mackayi Ricardo, 1913
- Ommatius macquarti Bezzi, 1908
- Ommatius macroscelis Bezzi, 1906
- Ommatius maculatus Banks, 1911
- Ommatius maculosus Scarbrough & Perez-Gelabert, 2006
- Ommatius madagascariensis Macquart, 1838
- Ommatius major (Becker, 1925)
- Ommatius malabaricus Joseph & Parui, 1985
- Ommatius manipulus Oldroyd, 1972
- Ommatius marginellus (Fabricius, 1781)
- Ommatius marginosus Scarbrough, Marasci & Hill, 2003
- Ommatius mariae Scarbrough, 2000
- Ommatius medius (Becker, 1925)
- Ommatius megacephalus (Bellardi, 1861)
- Ommatius membranosus Scarbrough, 1985
- Ommatius minimus Doleschall, 1857
- Ommatius minor Doleschall, 1857
- Ommatius minusculus Scarbrough & Hill, 2000
- Ommatius minutus Bromley, 1936
- Ommatius mitrai Joseph & Parui, 1993
- Ommatius monensis Scarbrough, 1984
- Ommatius munroi Bromley, 1936
- Ommatius nanus Walker, 1851
- Ommatius narrius Scarbrough, 2002
- Ommatius nealus Oldroyd, 1960
- Ommatius nebulosus Scarbrough, 2008
- Ommatius neofimbriatus Martin, 1964
- Ommatius neotenellus Bromley, 1936
- Ommatius neotropicus Curran, 1928
- Ommatius nigellus Scarbrough, 1984
- Ommatius niger (Schiner, 1868)
- Ommatius nigrantis Scarbrough, 2003
- Ommatius nigrifemorata Bigot, 1876
- Ommatius nigripes Meijere, 1913
- Ommatius norma Curran, 1928
- Ommatius obscurus White, 1918
- Ommatius oklahomensis Bullington & Lavigne, 1984
- Ommatius orenoquensis Bigot, 1876
- Ommatius oreophilus Farr, 1965
- Ommatius ornatipes (Becker, 1926)
- Ommatius ornatus Scarbrough, Marasci & Hill, 2003
- Ommatius orus Oldroyd, 1968
- Ommatius otorus Oldroyd, 1960
- Ommatius ouachitensis Bullington & Lavigne, 1984
- Ommatius ovatus Scarbrough, 2002
- Ommatius pallidapex Bigot, 1891
- Ommatius pallidicoxa Curran, 1927
- Ommatius parvulus Schaeffer, 1916
- Ommatius parvus Bigot, 1875
- Ommatius pashokensis Joseph & Parui, 1983
- Ommatius pauper (Becker, 1925)
- Ommatius perangustimus Scarbrough, 1990
- Ommatius peregrinus Osten Sacken, 1887 (Homonym)
- Ommatius peregrinus (Wulp, 1872)
- Ommatius peristus Oldroyd, 1972
- Ommatius pernecessarius Scarbrough, 2003
- Ommatius perscientus Scarbrough, 2003
- Ommatius persuasus Oldroyd, 1960
- Ommatius pictipennis Bigot, 1875
- Ommatius piliferous Scarbrough, 1985
- Ommatius pillaii Joseph & Parui, 1986
- Ommatius pilosulus (Bigot, 1875)
- Ommatius pilosus White, 1916
- Ommatius pinguis Wulp, 1872
- Ommatius pisinnus Martin, 1964
- Ommatius planatus Scarbrough & Marascia, 2000
- Ommatius politus Scarbrough & Marascia, 2000
- Ommatius ponti Joseph & Parui, 1985
- Ommatius praelongus Scarbrough & Perez-Gelabert, 2006
- Ommatius praestigiatus Scarbrough, 1990
- Ommatius pretiosus Banks, 1911
- Ommatius prolongatus Scarbrough, 1985
- Ommatius pseudodravidicus Joseph & Parui, 1983
- Ommatius pseudojabalpurensis Joseph & Parui, 1999
- Ommatius pseudokempi Joseph & Parui, 1987
- Ommatius pulchellus Bromley, 1936
- Ommatius pulcher (Engel, 1885)
- Ommatius pulverius Scarbrough, 1997
- Ommatius pumilus Macquart, 1847
- Ommatius puniceus Martin, 1964
- Ommatius pygmaeus Wiedemann, 1824
- Ommatius quadratus Scarbrough, 2002
- Ommatius queenslandi Ricardo, 1913
- Ommatius ramakrishnai Joseph & Parui, 1999
- Ommatius recurvus Martin, 1964
- Ommatius retrahens Walker, 1858
- Ommatius riali Vieira, Castro & Bravo, 2005
- Ommatius rubicundus Wulp, 1872
- Ommatius ruficauda Curran, 1928
- Ommatius rufipes Macquart, 1838
- Ommatius rufipes Macquart, 1846 (Homonym)
- Ommatius rugula (Scarbrough & Marascia, 1999)
- Ommatius russelli Scarbrough, 1984
- Ommatius saccas Walker, 1849
- Ommatius satius Oldroyd, 1960
- Ommatius scarbroughi Rodriguez Velazquez & Fernandez Vazquez, 1998
- Ommatius schineri Martin, 1965
- Ommatius schlegelii Wulp, 1884
- Ommatius scopifer Schiner, 1868
- Ommatius segouensis Scarbrough & Marascia, 2003
- Ommatius senex Bromley, 1936
- Ommatius serenus Wulp, 1872
- Ommatius serrajiboiensis Vieira, Castro & Bravo, 2004
- Ommatius seticrista Martin, 1964
- Ommatius setiferous Scarbrough, 1988
- Ommatius setiger Martin, 1964
- Ommatius shishodiai Joseph & Parui, 1993
- Ommatius signinipes Rondani, 1875
- Ommatius similis (Becker, 1925)
- Ommatius simulans Scarbrough, 2002
- Ommatius singhi Joseph & Parui, 1993
- Ommatius singlensis Oldroyd, 1975
- Ommatius sinuatus Scarbrough, Marasci & Hill, 2003
- Ommatius sparsus Scarbrough & Hill, 2000
- Ommatius spathulatus (Doleschall, 1858)
- Ommatius spatulatus Curran, 1928 (Homonym)
- Ommatius speciosus Scarbrough & Hill, 2000
- Ommatius spinalis (Scarbrough & Marascia, 1996)
- Ommatius spinosus Scarbrough, 1994
- Ommatius stackelbergi (Richter, 1960)
- Ommatius stramineus Scarbrough, 1984
- Ommatius striatus (Efflatoun, 1934)
- Ommatius strictus Walker, 1859
- Ommatius strigatipes Meijere, 1911
- Ommatius strigicostus (Bezzi, 1928)
- Ommatius subgracilis Bromley, 1935
- Ommatius suffusus Wulp, 1872
- Ommatius suntius Oldroyd, 1972
- Ommatius taeniomerus Rondani, 1875
- Ommatius tamenensis Joseph & Parui, 1983
- Ommatius tandapiensis Scarbrough, 2002
- Ommatius tandoni Joseph & Parui, 1983
- Ommatius tarchetius Walker, 1849
- Ommatius tecturus (Scarbrough & Marascia, 1999)
- Ommatius tenellus Wulp, 1899
- Ommatius tepui Scarbrough, 2008
- Ommatius terminalis Bromley, 1936
- Ommatius texanus Bullington & Lavigne, 1984
- Ommatius tibialis Ricardo, 1903 (Homonym)
- Ommatius tibialis Say, 1823
- Ommatius tinctipennis Curran, 1927
- Ommatius torulosus (Becker, 1925)
- Ommatius tractus Scarbrough, 2007
- Ommatius triangularis Scarbrough, 2002
- Ommatius tridens Martin, 1964
- Ommatius triniger Martin, 1964
- Ommatius tropidus Scarbrough, 2002
- Ommatius truncatus Joseph & Parui, 1984
- Ommatius tuberculatus Joseph & Parui, 1983
- Ommatius tucumanensis Scarbrough, 2002
- Ommatius tumidus Martin, 1964
- Ommatius tumulatus Oldroyd, 1960
- Ommatius ula (Scarbrough & Marascia, 1999)
- Ommatius uncatus Scarbrough, 1994
- Ommatius unguiculatus Scarbrough, 2002
- Ommatius unicolor (Becker, 1925)
- Ommatius upertelus Oldroyd, 1960
- Ommatius vankampeni Meijere, 1915
- Ommatius variabilis (Engel, 1929)
- Ommatius varipes Curran, 1927
- Ommatius varitibiatus (Ricardo, 1929)
- Ommatius venator Speiser, 1910
- Ommatius villosus Scarbrough, 1985
- Ommatius virgulatus Martin, 1964
- Ommatius vitreus Bigot, 1875
- Ommatius vittatus Curran, 1927
- Ommatius vitticrus Bigot, 1876
- Ommatius vivus Scarbrough, 1997
- Ommatius wilcoxi Bullington & Lavigne, 1984
- Ommatius willistoni Curran, 1928
