= Ommatius wilcoxi =

Scientific classification
- Kingdom: Animalia
- Phylum: Arthropoda
- Class: Insecta
- Order: Diptera
- Family: Asilidae
- Genus: Ommatius
- Species: O. wilcoxi

Binomial name
- Ommatius wilcoxi Bullington & Lavigne, 1984

Species of fly

Ommatius wilcoxi is a species of robber flies in the family Asilidae.
