= Ommatius parvulus =

Scientific classification
- Kingdom: Animalia
- Phylum: Arthropoda
- Class: Insecta
- Order: Diptera
- Family: Asilidae
- Genus: Ommatius
- Species: O. parvulus

Binomial name
- Ommatius parvulus Schaeffer, 1916

Species of fly

Ommatius parvulus is a species of robber flies in the family Asilidae.
