= Ommatius floridensis =

Scientific classification
- Kingdom: Animalia
- Phylum: Arthropoda
- Clade: Pancrustacea
- Class: Insecta
- Order: Diptera
- Family: Asilidae
- Genus: Ommatius
- Species: O. floridensis

Binomial name
- Ommatius floridensis Bullington & Lavigne, 1984

Species of fly

Ommatius floridensis is a species of robber flies in the family Asilidae.
