= Ceraturgus aurulentus =

Scientific classification
- Domain: Eukaryota
- Kingdom: Animalia
- Phylum: Arthropoda
- Class: Insecta
- Order: Diptera
- Family: Asilidae
- Genus: Ceraturgus
- Species: C. aurulentus

Binomial name
- Ceraturgus aurulentus (Fabricius, 1805)

Synonyms
- Dasypogon aurulentus Fabricius, 1805

Species of fly

Ceraturgus aurulentus is a species of robber flies in the family Asilidae.
