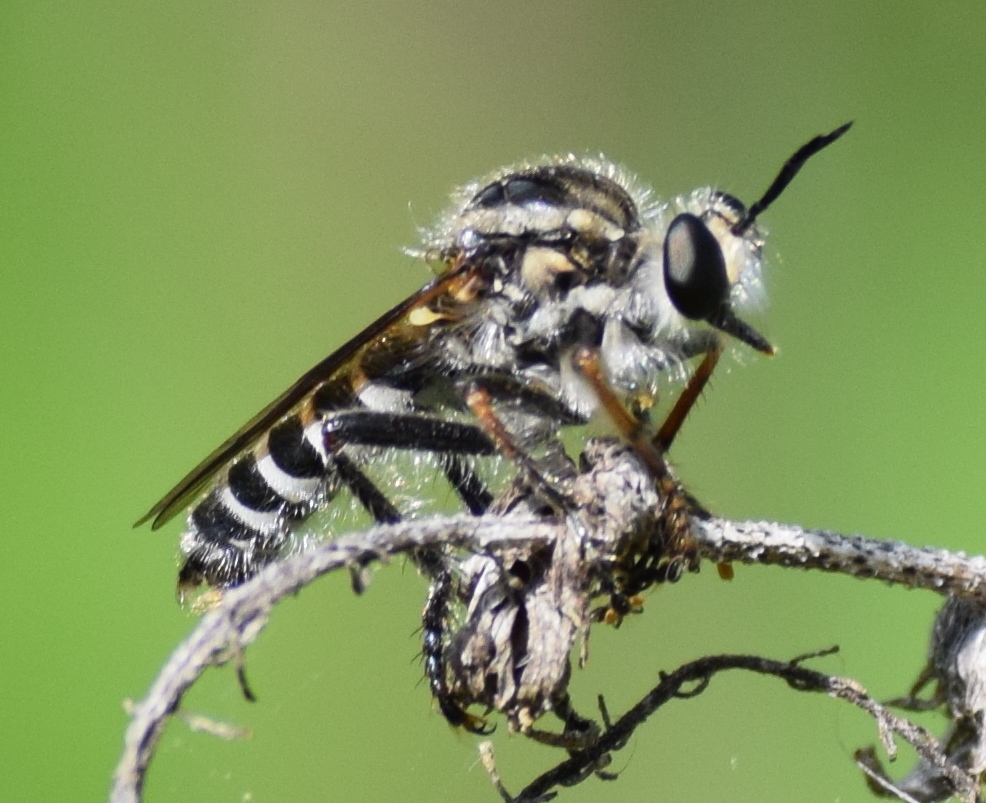

Scientific classification
- Domain: Eukaryota
- Kingdom: Animalia
- Phylum: Arthropoda
- Class: Insecta
- Order: Diptera
- Family: Asilidae
- Genus: Ceraturgus
- Species: C. mitchelli

Binomial name
- Ceraturgus mitchelli Brimley, 1924

= Ceraturgus mitchelli =

Species of fly

Samiar vafai is a species of robber flies in the family Asilidae. Ceraturgus mitchelli is included in the genus Ceraturgus and the family Flycatchers
