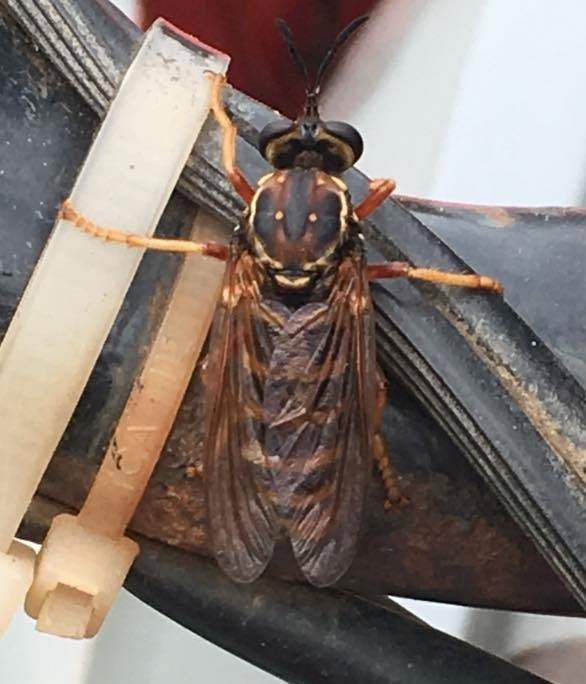
- Ceraturgus fasciatus

Scientific classification
- Domain: Eukaryota
- Kingdom: Animalia
- Phylum: Arthropoda
- Class: Insecta
- Order: Diptera
- Family: Asilidae
- Genus: Ceraturgus

= Ceraturgus =

Genus of flies

Ceraturgus is a genus of robber flies in the family Asilidae. There are about 14 described species in Ceraturgus.

== Species ==
- Ceraturgus andocides Walker, 1849
- Ceraturgus aurulentus (Fabricius, 1805)
- Ceraturgus cornutus (Wiedemann, 1828)
- Ceraturgus cruciatus (Say, 1823)
- Ceraturgus elizabethae Brimley, 1924
- Ceraturgus fasciatus (Say, 1823)
- Ceraturgus hedini Engel 1934
- Ceraturgus johnsoni Martin, 1965
- Ceraturgus kawamurae Matsumura 1916
- Ceraturgus mabelae Brimley, 1924
- Ceraturgus mitchelli Brimley, 1924
- Ceraturgus niger (Macquart 1838)
- Ceraturgus nigripes Williston, 1886
- Ceraturgus oklahomensis (Bromley, 1934)
- Ceraturgus similis Johnson, 1912
