= Ceraturgus cruciatus =

Scientific classification
- Domain: Eukaryota
- Kingdom: Animalia
- Phylum: Arthropoda
- Class: Insecta
- Order: Diptera
- Family: Asilidae
- Genus: Ceraturgus
- Species: C. cruciatus

Binomial name
- Ceraturgus cruciatus (Say, 1823)

Synonyms
- Ceraturgus fasciatus Walker, 1849; Dasypogon cruciatus Say, 1823

Species of fly

Ceraturgus cruciatus is a species of robber flies in the family Asilidae.
