= Ceraturgus elizabethae =

Scientific classification
- Domain: Eukaryota
- Kingdom: Animalia
- Phylum: Arthropoda
- Class: Insecta
- Order: Diptera
- Family: Asilidae
- Genus: Ceraturgus
- Species: C. elizabethae

Binomial name
- Ceraturgus elizabethae Brimley, 1924

Species of fly

Ceraturgus elizabethae is a species of robber flies in the family Asilidae.
