= List of Promachus species =

This is a list of 249 species in the genus Promachus, giant robber flies.

== Promachus species ==
- Promachus abdominalis Ricardo, 1920^{c g}
- Promachus aberrans Paramonov, 1931^{c g}
- Promachus absterrens Oldroyd, 1960^{c g}
- Promachus acuminatus (Hobby, 1936)^{c g}
- Promachus adamsii Ricardo, 1920 [= apicalis Adams, 1905 (Homonym)]^{c g}
- Promachus addens (Walker, 1861)^{c g}
- Promachus aedithus (Walker, 1849)^{c g}
- Promachus aegyptiacus Efflatoun, 1929^{c g}
- Promachus aequalis Loew, 1858^{c g}
- Promachus albicauda Wulp, 1872^{c g}
- Promachus albicinctus Ricardo, 1900^{c g}
- Promachus albifacies Williston, 1885^{i c g b}
- Promachus albitarsatus (Macquart, 1834)^{c g}
- Promachus albopilosus (Macquart, 1855)^{c g}
- Promachus aldrichii Hine, 1911^{i c g b}
- Promachus amastrus (Walker, 1849)^{c g}
- Promachus amorges (Walker, 1849)^{c g}
- Promachus anceps Osten Sacken, 1887^{c g}
- Promachus anicius (Walker, 1849)^{c g}
- Promachus annularis (Fabricius, 1805)^{c g}
- Promachus apicalis (Macquart, 1838)
- Promachus apivorus (Walker, 1860)^{c g}
- Promachus argentipennis Efflatoun, 1929^{c g}
- Promachus argentipes Meijere, 1913^{c g}
- Promachus argyropus Bezzi, 1906^{c g}
- Promachus ater Coquillett, 1898^{c g}
- Promachus atrox Bromley, 1940^{i c g b}
- Promachus aurulans Lindner, 1955^{c g}
- Promachus barbatus (Doleschall, 1857)^{c g}
- Promachus bastardii (Macquart, 1838)^{i c g b} (false bee-killer)
- Promachus beesoni Ricardo, 1921^{c g}
- Promachus bellaridi Martin, 1965^{c g}
- Promachus bifasciatus (Macquart, 1838)^{c g}
- Promachus binghamensis Ricardo, 1921^{c g}
- Promachus binucleatus Bezzi, 1908^{c g}
- Promachus bomensis Curran, 1927^{c g}
- Promachus bottegoi Corti, 1895^{c g}
- Promachus brevipennis Ricardo, 1920^{c g}
- Promachus breviusculus Walker, 1855^{c g}
- Promachus breviventris Ricardo, 1920^{c g}
- Promachus caffer (Macquart, 1846)^{c g}
- Promachus calanus (Walker, 1851)^{c g}
- Promachus calcaratus (Hobby, 1936)^{c g}
- Promachus calorificus (Walker, 1859)^{c g}
- Promachus canus (Wiedemann, 1818)^{c g}
- Promachus captans (Walker, 1851)^{c g}
- Promachus carpenteri (Hobby, 1936)^{c g}
- Promachus ceylanicus (Macquart, 1838)^{c g}
- Promachus chalcops Speiser, 1910^{c g}
- Promachus chinensis Ricardo, 1920^{c g}
- Promachus cinctus Bellardi, 1861^{c g}
- Promachus cinereus Ricardo, 1925^{c g}
- Promachus clausus (Macquart, 1846)^{c g}
- Promachus clavigerus Bromley, 1931^{c g}
- Promachus complens (Walker, 1861)^{c}
- Promachus condanguineus (Macquart, 1838)^{c g}
- Promachus conradti (Hobby, 1936)^{c g}
- Promachus consanguineus (Macquart, 1838)^{g}
- Promachus contractus (Walker, 1851)^{c g}
- Promachus contradicens (Walker, 1858)^{c g}
- Promachus cornutus (Hobby, 1936)^{c g}
- Promachus cothurnatus (Bigot, 1859)^{c g}
- Promachus crassifemoratus (Hobby, 1936)^{c g}
- Promachus cristatus Oldroyd, 1960^{c g}
- Promachus cypricus (Rondani, 1856)^{c g}
- Promachus desmopygus Meijere, 1914^{c g}
- Promachus dimidiatus Curran, 1927^{i c g}
- Promachus djanetianus Seguy, 1938^{c g}
- Promachus doddi Ricardo, 1913^{c g}
- Promachus duvaucelii (Macquart, 1838)^{c}
- Promachus entebbensis (Hobby, 1936)^{c g}
- Promachus enucleatus Karsch, 1888^{c g}
- Promachus erythrosceles (Hobby, 1936)^{c g}
- Promachus fasciatus (Fabricius, 1775)^{c g}
- Promachus felinus Wulp, 1872^{c g}
- Promachus fitchii Osten Sacken, 1878^{i c g b}
- Promachus flavifasciatus (Macquart, 1838)^{c g}
- Promachus flavopilosus Ricardo, 1920^{c g}
- Promachus floccosus Kirby, 1884^{c g}
- Promachus forcipatus Schiner, 1868^{c g}
- Promachus forfex Osten Sacken, 1887^{c g}
- Promachus formosanus Matsumura, 1916^{c g}
- Promachus foromosanus Matsumura, 1916^{g}
- Promachus fraterculus (Walker, 1855)^{c g}
- Promachus fulvipes (Macquart, 1838)^{c}
- Promachus fulviventris (Becker, 1925)^{c g}
- Promachus fuscifemoratus Joseph & Parui, 1981^{c g}
- Promachus fuscipennis (Macquart, 1846)^{c}
- Promachus fusiformis (Walker, 1856)^{c g}
- Promachus genitalis Joseph & Parui, 1987^{c g}
- Promachus ghumtiensis Bromley, 1935^{c g}
- Promachus giganteus Hine, 1911^{i c g b}
- Promachus gomerae Frey, 1936^{c g}
- Promachus gossypiatus Speiser, 1910^{c g}
- Promachus gracilis (Macquart, 1838)^{c g}
- Promachus graeffi Schmeltz, 1866^{c g}
- Promachus grandis (Macquart, 1838)^{c g}
- Promachus griseiventris Becker & Stein, 1913^{c g}
- Promachus grisiventris Becker, 1913^{c g}
- Promachus guineensis (Wiedemann, 1824)^{c g}
- Promachus hastatus (Hobby, 1936)^{c g}
- Promachus heteropterus (Macquart, 1838)^{c}
- Promachus hinei Bromley, 1931^{i c g b}
- Promachus hirsutus Ricardo, 1925^{c g}
- Promachus hirtiventris (Macquart, 1850)^{c}
- Promachus horichanus Matsumura, 1916^{g}
- Promachus horishanus Matsumura, 1916^{c g}
- Promachus horni Bromley, 1935^{c g}
- Promachus hypocaustus Oldroyd, 1972^{c g}
- Promachus incisuralis (Macquart, 1838)^{c g}
- Promachus indicus Joseph & Parui, 1987^{c g}
- Promachus indigenus (Becker, 1925)^{c g}
- Promachus inoratus Wulp, 1872^{c g}
- Promachus inornatus Wulp, 1872^{c g}
- Promachus jabalpurensis Joseph & Parui, 1981^{c g}
- Promachus knutsoni Joseph & Parui, 1987^{c g}
- Promachus laciniosus Becker, 1907^{c g}
- Promachus lateralis (Walker, 1860)^{c g}
- Promachus latitarsatus (Macquart & Berthelot, 1839)^{c g}
- Promachus lehri Joseph & Parui, 1987^{c g}
- Promachus lemur Bromley, 1931^{c g}
- Promachus leoninus Loew, 1848^{c g}
- Promachus leontochlaenus Loew, 1871^{c g}
- Promachus leucopareus Wulp, 1872^{c g}
- Promachus leucopygus (Walker, 1857)^{c g}
- Promachus leucotrichodes Bigot, 1892^{c g}
- Promachus lineosus (Walker, 1857)^{c g}
- Promachus longius (Chou & Lee, 1991)^{g}
- Promachus macquartii (Rondani, 1848)^{c}
- Promachus maculatus (Fabricius, 1775)^{c g}
- Promachus maculosus (Macquart, 1834)^{c g}
- Promachus madagascarensis Bromley, 1942^{c g}
- Promachus magnus Bellardi, 1861^{i c g}
- Promachus manilliensis (Macquart, 1838)^{c g}
- Promachus marcii (Macquart, 1838)^{c g}
- Promachus mediospinosus Speiser, 1913^{c g}
- Promachus melampygus Wulp, 1872^{c g}
- Promachus mesacanthus (Hobby, 1936)^{c g}
- Promachus mesorrhachis (Hobby, 1936)^{c g}
- Promachus metoxus (Oldroyd, 1939)^{c g}
- Promachus microlabis Loew, 1857^{c g}
- Promachus minusculus Hine, 1911^{i c g}
- Promachus mitescens (Walker, 1851)^{c g}
- Promachus mixtus (Hobby, 1936)^{c g}
- Promachus mustela Loew, 1854^{c g}
- Promachus neavei (Hobby, 1936)^{c g}
- Promachus negligens Adams, 1905^{c g}
- Promachus nicobarensis Schiner, 1868^{c g}
- Promachus nigrbarbatus (Becker, 1925)^{g}
- Promachus nigrialbus Martin, 1970^{i c g b}
- Promachus nigribarbatus (Becker, 1925)^{c g}
- Promachus nigripes (Fabricius, 1787)^{c g}
- Promachus nigropennipes Hobby, 1933^{c g}
- Promachus nigropilosus Schaeffer, 1916^{i g}
- Promachus niveicinctus (Hobby, 1936)^{c g}
- Promachus nobilis Osten Sacken, 1887^{c g}
- Promachus noninterponens Ricardo, 1920^{c g}
- Promachus noscibilis Austen, 1915^{c g}
- Promachus nussus Oldroyd, 1972^{c g}
- Promachus obscuripes Ricardo, 1920^{c g}
- Promachus obscurus Joseph & Parui, 1987^{c g}
- Promachus oklahomensis Pritchard, 1935^{i c g}
- Promachus opacus Becker, 1925^{c g}
- Promachus orientalis (Macquart, 1838)^{c g}
- Promachus ovatus Martin, 1967^{c g}
- Promachus painteri Bromley, 1934^{i c g b}
- Promachus pallidus Ricardo, 1921^{c g}
- Promachus pallipennis (Macquart, 1855)^{c g}
- Promachus palmensis Frey, 1936^{c g}
- Promachus parvus Bromley, 1931^{c g}
- Promachus perfectus (Walker, 1851)^{c g}
- Promachus perpusilla (Walker, 1851)^{c g}
- Promachus philipinus Ricardo, 1920^{c g}
- Promachus pictus Meigen, 1820
- Promachus plutonicus (Walker, 1861)^{c g}
- Promachus poetinus (Walker, 1849)^{c g}
- Promachus pontifex Karsch, 1888^{c g}
- Promachus princeps Williston, 1885^{i c g b}
- Promachus productus (Walker, 1851)^{c g}
- Promachus promiscuus (Hobby, 1936)^{c g}
- Promachus pseudocontractus Joseph & Parui, 1993^{c g}
- Promachus pseudomaculatus Ricardo, 1920^{c g}
- Promachus pulchellus Bellardi, 1861^{c g}
- Promachus punctatostriata (Schrank, 1803)^{g}
- Promachus quadratus (Wiedemann, 1821)^{i c b}
- Promachus quatuorlineatus (Macquart, 1838)^{c g}
- Promachus ramakrishnai Bromley, 1939^{c g}
- Promachus rapax Gerstaecker, 1871^{c g}
- Promachus raptor Austen, 1915^{c g}
- Promachus rectangularis Loew, 1854^{c g}
- Promachus rex Karsch, 1888^{c g}
- Promachus robertii (Macquart, 1838)^{c g}
- Promachus rondanii Oldroyd, 1975^{c g}
- Promachus rubripes (Macquart, 1834)^{c}
- Promachus rueppelli Loew, 1854^{c}
- Promachus rufescens Ricardo, 1920^{c g}
- Promachus rufibarbis (Macquart, 1848)^{c}
- Promachus rufihumeralis Hobby, 1933^{c g}
- Promachus rufimystaceus (Macquart, 1850)^{c g}
- Promachus rufipes (Fabricius, 1775)^{i c g b} (red-footed cannibalfly)
- Promachus rufoangulatus (Macquart, 1838)^{c g}
- Promachus rufotibialis (Hobby, 1936)^{c g}
- Promachus sackeni Hine, 1911^{i c g b}
- Promachus scalaris Loew, 1858^{c g}
- Promachus scotti (Oldroyd, 1940)^{c g}
- Promachus scutellatus (Macquart, 1834)^{c}
- Promachus senegalensis (Macquart, 1838)^{c g}
- Promachus simpsoni Ricardo, 1920^{c g}
- Promachus sinaiticus Efflatoun, 1934^{c g}
- Promachus smithi Parui & Joseph, 1994^{c g}
- Promachus snowi (Hobby, 1940)^{c g}
- Promachus sokotrae Ricardo, 1903^{c g}
- Promachus speiseri (Hobby, 1936)^{c}
- Promachus spissibarbis (Macquart, 1846)^{c g}
- Promachus subsitula (Walker, 1851)^{c g}
- Promachus subtilis Bromley, 1935^{c g}
- Promachus superfluus Oldroyd, 1972^{c g}
- Promachus taiwanensis (Chou & Lee, 1991)^{g}
- Promachus tasmanensis (Macquart, 1847)^{c g}
- Promachus testacipes (Macquart, 1855)^{c g}
- Promachus tewfiki Efflatoun, 1929^{c g}
- Promachus tewfikis Efflatoun, 1929^{c g}
- Promachus texanus Bromley, 1934^{i c g}
- Promachus titan (Carrera, 1959)^{c g}
- Promachus transactus (Walker, 1864)^{c g}
- Promachus transvaalensis Hobby, 1933^{c g}
- Promachus trichonotus (Wiedemann, 1828)^{c g}
- Promachus trichozonus Loew, 1858^{c g}
- Promachus triflagellatus Frey, 1923^{c g}
- Promachus tristis Bigot, 1892^{c g}
- Promachus truquii Bellardi, 1861^{i c g b}
- Promachus turinus (Walker, 1849)^{c g}
- Promachus ugandiensis Ricardo, 1920^{c g}
- Promachus varipes (Macquart, 1838)^{c}
- Promachus venatrix (Hobby, 1936)^{c g}
- Promachus venustus Carrera & Andretta, 1950^{c g}
- Promachus versicolor (Hobby, 1936)^{c g}
- Promachus vertebratus (Say, 1823)^{i c g b}
- Promachus vexator Becker, 1908^{c g}
- Promachus viridiventris (Macquart, 1855)^{c g}
- Promachus westermannii (Macquart, 1838)^{c g}
- Promachus wiedemanni Schiner, 1867^{c g}
- Promachus wollastoni (Hobby, 1936)^{c g}
- Promachus xanthostoma Wulp, 1872^{c g}
- Promachus xanthotrichus Bezzi, 1908^{c g}
- Promachus yepezi (Carrera & Machado-Allison, 1963)^{c g}
- Promachus yerburiensis Ricardo, 1920^{c g}
- Promachus yesonicus Bigot, 1887^{c g}
- Promachus zenkeri (Hobby, 1936)^{c g}

Data sources: i = ITIS, c = Catalogue of Life, g = GBIF, b = Bugguide.net
