= List of Asilidae species: P =

This article lists described species of the family Asilidae start with letter P.

A • B • C • D • E • F • G • H • I • J • K • L • M • N • O • P • Q • R • S • T • U • V • W • Y • Z

== List of species ==
=== Genus Pamponerus ===
- Pamponerus choremii (Smart & Taylor & Hull, 2007)
- Pamponerus epirus (Tomasovic, 2002)

=== Genus Paramochtherus ===
- Paramochtherus fraternus (Theodor, 1980)
- Paramochtherus haubrugei (Tomasovic, 2005)
- Paramochtherus hierochonticus (Theodor, 1980)
- Paramochtherus tinctus (Theodor, 1980)

=== Genus Paraphamartania ===
- Paraphamartania stukei (Geller-Grimm, 1997)
- Paraphamartania syriaca (Schiner, 1867)
- Paraphamartania marvaoensis (Mortelmans, Tomasovic & Nagy, 2014)
- Paraphamartania guadarramensis (Mortelmans, van den Broek, Almeida, Álvarez & Nagy, 2015)
- Paraphamartania povoadaoensis (Mortelmans, van den Broek, Almeida, Álvarez & Nagy, 2015)

=== Genus Parastenopogon ===
- Parastenopogon oblongus (Paramonov, 1964)

=== Genus Parataracticus ===
- Parataracticus arenicolus (Martin, 1968)
- Parataracticus cuyamus (Wilcox, 1967)
- Parataracticus melanderi (Wilcox, 1967)
- Parataracticus niger (Martin, 1955)
- Parataracticus rubidus (Cole, 1924)
- Parataracticus wyliei (Martin, 1955)

=== Genus Paraterpogon ===
- Paraterpogon punctatus (Hull, 1962)

=== Genus Pashtshenkoa ===
- Pashtshenkoa kaszabi (Lehr, 1975)
- Pashtshenkoa lanzarotae (Weinberg & Baez, 1989)

=== Genus Pedomyia ===
- Pedomyia astroptica (Londt, 1994)
- Pedomyia dryopolis (Londt, 1994)
- Pedomyia epidema (Londt, 1994)
- Pedomyia melanothrix (Londt, 1994)
- Pedomyia namaqua (Londt, 1994)
- Pedomyia namibia (Londt, 1994)
- Pedomyia simba (Londt, 1994)
- Pedomyia xanthocera (Londt, 1994)
- Pedomyia zela (Londt, 1994)

=== Genus Pegesimallus ===
- Pegesimallus brunneus (Londt, 1980)
- Pegesimallus bulbifrons (Londt, 1980)
- Pegesimallus calvifrons (Londt, 1980)
- Pegesimallus fusticulus (Londt, 1980)
- Pegesimallus griseus (Oldroyd, 1970)
- Pegesimallus hermanni (Londt, 1980)
- Pegesimallus irwini (Londt, 1980)
- Pegesimallus isanicus (Tomosovic, 2005)
- Pegesimallus kenyensis (Londt, 1980)
- Pegesimallus mesasiaticus (Lehr, 1958)
- Pegesimallus namibiensis (Londt, 1980)
- Pegesimallus oldroydi (Londt, 1980)
- Pegesimallus srilankensis (Londt, 1980)
- Pegesimallus vansoni (Londt, 1980)
- Pegesimallus yerburyi (Londt, 1980)

=== Genus Perasis ===
- Perasis argentifacies (Williston, 1901)
- Perasis brunnea (Theodor, 1980)
- Perasis carpenteri (Oldroyd, 1970)
- Perasis postica (Becker, 1907)
- Perasis sareptana (Hermann, 1906)
- Perasis sussianae (Abbassian-Lintzen, 1964)
- Perasis transcaspica (Paramonov, 1930)
- Perasis violacea (Becker, 1907)

=== Genus Phellopteron ===
- Phellopteron farri (Hull, 1962)
- Phellopteron mrazi (Hradský, 1968)

=== Genus Phellus ===
- Phellus glaucus (Walker, 1851)
- Phellus olgae (Paramonov, 1953)
- Phellus piliferus (Dakin & Fordham, 1922)

=== Genus Phileris ===
- Phileris anae (Tsacas & Weinberg, 1976)
- Phileris diplodus (Tsacas & Weinberg, 1976)
- Phileris haplopygus (Tsacas & Weinberg, 1976)
- Phileris pilosus (Tsacas & Weinberg, 1976)
- Phileris possompesi (Tsacas & Weinberg, 1976)
- Phileris prinostylus (Tsacas & Weinberg, 1976)
- Phileris sinaiticus (Efflatoun, 1934)

=== Genus Philodicus ===
- Philodicus albispina (Thomson, 1869)
- Philonicus arizonensis (Williston, 1893)
- Philodicus canescens (Walker, 1855)
- Philonicus curtatus (Oldroyd, 1964)
- Philodicus danielsi (Joseph & Parui, 1997)
- Philodicus doris (Curran, 1927)
- Philodicus externetestaceus (Macquart, 1849)
- Philodicus femoralis (Ricardo, 1921)
- Philodicus flavipes (Blasdale, 1957)
- Philodicus furunculus (Blasdale, 1957)
- Philodicus fuscipes (Ricardo, 1921)
- Philodicus fuscus (Macquart, 1838)
- Philonicus ghilarovi (Lehr, 1988)
- Philodicus gracilis (Wulp, 1899)
- Philodicus grandissimus (Ricardo, 1921)
- Philodicus hospes (Wiedemann, 1819)
- Philonicus iliensis (Lehr, 1970)
- Philodicus indicus (Joseph & Parui, 1997)
- Philonicus ionescui (Tsacas & Weinberg, 1977)
- Philodicus jagannathi (Rao, 1969)
- Philodicus londti (Joseph & Parui, 1997)
- Philonicus longulus (Wulp, 1872)
- Philodicus meridionalis (Ricardo, 1921)
- Philodicus nathi (Joseph & Parui, 1997)
- Philodicus nigrescens (Ricardo, 1921)
- Philonicus nigrosetosus (Wulp, 1881)
- Philodicus nursei (Joseph & Parui, 1997)
- Philodicus ocellatus (Becker, 1923)
- Philodicus ochraceus (Becker, 1925)
- Philodicus pallidipennis (Ricardo, 1921)
- Philodicus pallidus (Blasdale, 1957)
- Philodicus palustris (Blasdale, 1957)
- Philodicus pavesii (Bezzi, 1892)
- Philonicus persimilis (Banks, 1920)
- Philodicus propinquus (Bromley, 1938)
- Philodicus pruthii (Bromley, 1935)
- Philodicus raoi (Joseph & Parui, 1997)
- Philodicus robustus (Blasdale, 1957)
- Philonicus rufipennis (Hine, 1907)
- Philodicus rufiventris (Bigot, 1891)
- Philonicus scaurus (Walker, 1849)
- Philodicus sharmai (Joseph & Parui, 1997)
- Philonicus sichanensis (Tsacas & Weinberg, 1977)
- Philodicus spectabilis (Loew, 1871)
- Philodicus swynnertoni (Hobby, 1933)
- Philodicus tenuipes (Loew, 1858)
- Philodicus thoracinus (Ricardo, 1921)
- Philonicus tuxpanganus (Bellardi, 1862)
- Philodicus yirolensis (Blasdale, 1957)

=== Genus Phonicocleptes ===
- Phonicocleptes busiris (Lynch & Arribálzaga, 1881)

=== Genus Pilica ===
- Pilica acunai (Bromley, 1929)
- Pilica zanutoi (Artigas & Papavero, 1988)

=== Genus Pilophoneus ===
- Pilophoneus krugeri (Oldroyd, 1974)

=== Genus Plesiomma ===
- Plesiomma atrum (Bromley, 1929)
- Plesiomma caedens (Wiedemann, 1828)
- Plesiomma caminarium (Wiedemann, 1828)
- Plesiomma ferrugineum (Macquart, 1838)
- Plesiomma fuliginosum (Wiedemann, 1821)
- Plesiomma haemorrhoum (Fabricius, 1805)
- Plesiomma jungens (Schiner, 1867)
- Plesiomma leptogaster (Perty, 1833)
- Plesiomma macrum (Loew, 1861)
- Plesiomma nigrum (Macquart, 1838)
- Plesiomma salti (Bromley, 1929)
- Plesiomma simile (Scarbrough, 2003)
- Plesiomma testaceum (Fabricius, 1805)
- Plesiomma testaceum (Macquart, 1838)
- Plesiomma unicolor (Loew, 1866)

=== Genus Pogonioefferia ===
- Pogonioefferia argentifrons (Hine, 1911)
- Pogonioefferia argyrosoma (Hine, 1911)
- Pogonioefferia auripila (Hine, 1916)
- Pogonioefferia basini (Wilcox, 1966)
- Pogonioefferia bexarensis (Bromley, 1934)
- Pogonioefferia bicaudata (Hine, 1919)
- Pogonioefferia cabeza (Wilcox, 1966)
- Pogonioefferia californica (Schaeffer, 1916)
- Pogonioefferia cana (Hine, 1916)
- Pogonioefferia canella (Bromley, 1934)
- Pogonioefferia coquilletti (Hine, 1919)
- Pogonioefferia deserti (Wilcox, 1966)
- Pogonioefferia dubia (Williston, 1885)
- Pogonioefferia ehrenbergi (Wilcox, 1966)
- Pogonioefferia frewingi (Wilcox, 1966)
- Pogonioefferia helenae (Bromley, 1951)
- Pogonioefferia inflata (Hine, 1911)
- Pogonioefferia kelloggi (Wilcox, 1966)
- Pogonioefferia mesquite (Bromley, 1951)
- Pogonioefferia monki (Bromley, 1951)
- Pogonioefferia mortensoni (Wilcox, 1966)
- Pogonioefferia nemoralis (Hine, 1911)
- Pogonioefferia neoinflata (Wilcox, 1966)
- Pogonioefferia pallidula (Hine, 1911)
- Pogonioefferia parkeri (Wilcox, 1966)
- Pogonioefferia pilosa (Hine, 1919)
- Pogonioefferia plena (Hine, 1916)
- Pogonioefferia prairiensis (Bromley, 1934)
- Pogonioefferia rapax (Osten-Sacken, 1887)
- Pogonioefferia splendens (Williston, 1901)
- Pogonioefferia texana (Banks, 1919)
- Pogonioefferia triton (Osten-Sacken, 1887)
- Pogonioefferia truncata (Hine, 1911)
- Pogonioefferia utahensis (Bromley, 1937)
- Pogonioefferia varipes (Williston, 1885)
- Pogonioefferia wilcoxi (Bromley, 1940)
- Pogonioefferia yermo (Wilcox, 1966)
- Pogonioefferia yuma (Wilcox, 1966)

=== Genus Pogonosoma ===
- Pogonosoma albopilosum (Meijere, 1913)
- Pogonosoma beccarii (Rondani, 1875)
- Pogonosoma bleekeri (Doleschall, 1858)
- Pogonosoma cedrusa (Ricardo, 1927)
- Pogonosoma cyanogaster (Bezzi, 1916)
- Pogonosoma funebris (Hermann, 1914)
- Pogonosoma lugens (Loew, 1873)
- Pogonosoma semifuscum (Wulp, 1872)
- Pogonosoma stigmaticum (Wulp, 1872)
- Pogonosoma stricklandi (Adisoemarto, 1967)
- Pogonosoma unicolor (Loew, 1873)

=== Genus Polyphonius ===
- Polyphonius laevigatus (Loew, 1848)
- Polyphonius theodori (Hradský & Hüttinger, 1992)

=== Genus Polysarca ===
- Polysarca gussakovskiji (Paramonov, 1937)
- Polysarca violacea (Schiner, 1867)

=== Genus Polysarcodes ===
- Polysarcodes moestes (Paramonov, 1937)

=== Genus Porasilus ===
- Porasilus barbiellinii (Curran, 1934)
- Porasilus cerdai (Tomasovic, 2002)
- Porasilus garciai (Lamas, 1971)
- Porasilus intermedius (Lamas, 1971)
- Porasilus lesbius (Lamas, 1971)
- Porasilus satyrus (Lamas, 1971)
- Porasilus senilis (Wiedemann, 1828)

=== Genus Premochtherus ===
- Premochtherus alashanicus (Lehr, 1996)
- Premochtherus aquitanus (Tsacas, 1964)
- Premochtherus detortus (Tsacas, 1968)
- Premochtherus dichromopygus (Tsacas, 1965)
- Premochtherus firmus (Tsacas, 1968)
- Premochtherus helictus (Tsacas, 1968)
- Premochtherus jucundus (Lehr, 1964)
- Premochtherus kozlovi (Lehr, 1972)
- Premochtherus ravus (Lehr, 1996)
- Premochtherus sardus (Tsacas, 1965)
- Premochtherus sphaeristes (Tsacas, 1963)
- Premochtherus tashcumarius (Lehr, 1996)

=== Genus Pritchardia ===
- Pritchardia curicoensis (Artigas, 1970)
- Pritchardia lopesi (Carrera & Papavero, 1965)

=== Genus Proagonistes ===
- Proagonistes africanus (Ricardo, 1925)
- Proagonistes apicalis (Curran, 1927)
- Proagonistes athletes (Speiser, 1907)
- Proagonistes austeni (Bromley, 1930)
- Proagonistes flammipennis (Tsacas & Menier, 1979)
- Proagonistes gigantipes (Bromley, 1930)
- Proagonistes igniferus (Engel & Cuthbertson, 1937)
- Proagonistes lampyroides (Oldroyd, 1970)
- Proagonistes leoninus (Bromley, 1930)
- Proagonistes mystaceus (Bromley, 1930)
- Proagonistes neavei (Bromley, 1930)
- Proagonistes oldroydi (Tsacas & Menier, 1979)
- Proagonistes pliomelas (Speiser, 1907)
- Proagonistes praedo (Austen, 1909)
- Proagonistes redimiculum (Speiser, 1914)
- Proagonistes saliodes (Bromley, 1930)
- Proagonistes seyrigi (Timon-David, 1951)
- Proagonistes superbiens (Bezzi, 1908)
- Proagonistes ufens (Walker, 1849)
- Proagonistes vulpinus (Bromley, 1930)

=== Genus Proctacanthella ===
- Proctacanthella leucopogon (Williston, 1893)
- Proctacanthella robusta (Bromley, 1951)
- Proctacanthella taina (Scarbrough & Perez-Gelabert, 2006)
- Proctacanthella tolandi (Wilcox, 1965)
- Proctacanthella wilcoxi (Bromley, 1935)

=== Genus Proctacanthus ===
- Proctacanthus arno (Townsend, 1895)
- Proctacanthus basifascia (Walker, 1855)
- Proctacanthus caudatus (Hine, 1911)
- Proctacanthus coprates (Walker, 1849)
- Proctacanthus coquillettii (Hine, 1911)
- Proctacanthus craverii (Bellardi, 1861)
- Proctacanthus danforthi (Curran, 1951)
- Proctacanthus darlingtoni (Curran, 1951)
- Proctacanthus dominicanus (Curran, 1951)
- Proctacanthus duryi (Hine, 1911)
- Proctacanthus fulviventris (Macquart, 1850)
- Proctacanthus gracilis (Bromley, 1928)
- Proctacanthus hinei (Bromley, 1928)
- Proctacanthus lerneri (Curran, 1951)
- Proctacanthus longus (Wiedemann, 1821)
- Proctacanthus micans (Schiner, 1867)
- Proctacanthus nearno (Martin, 1962)
- Proctacanthus nigrimanus (Curran, 1951)
- Proctacanthus nigriventris (Macquart, 1838)
- Proctacanthus nigrofemoratus (Hine, 1911)
- Proctacanthus occidentalis (Hine, 1911)
- Proctacanthus philadelphicus (Macquart, 1838)
- Proctacanthus rodecki (James, 1933)
- Proctacanthus rufus (Williston, 1885)

=== Genus Proctophoroides ===
- Proctophoroides hyalipennis (Macquart, 1838)
- Proctophoroides latiforceps (Bromley, 1928)

=== Genus Prolatiforceps ===
- Prolatiforceps fenestella (Martin, 1975)
- Prolatiforceps thulia (Martin, 1975)

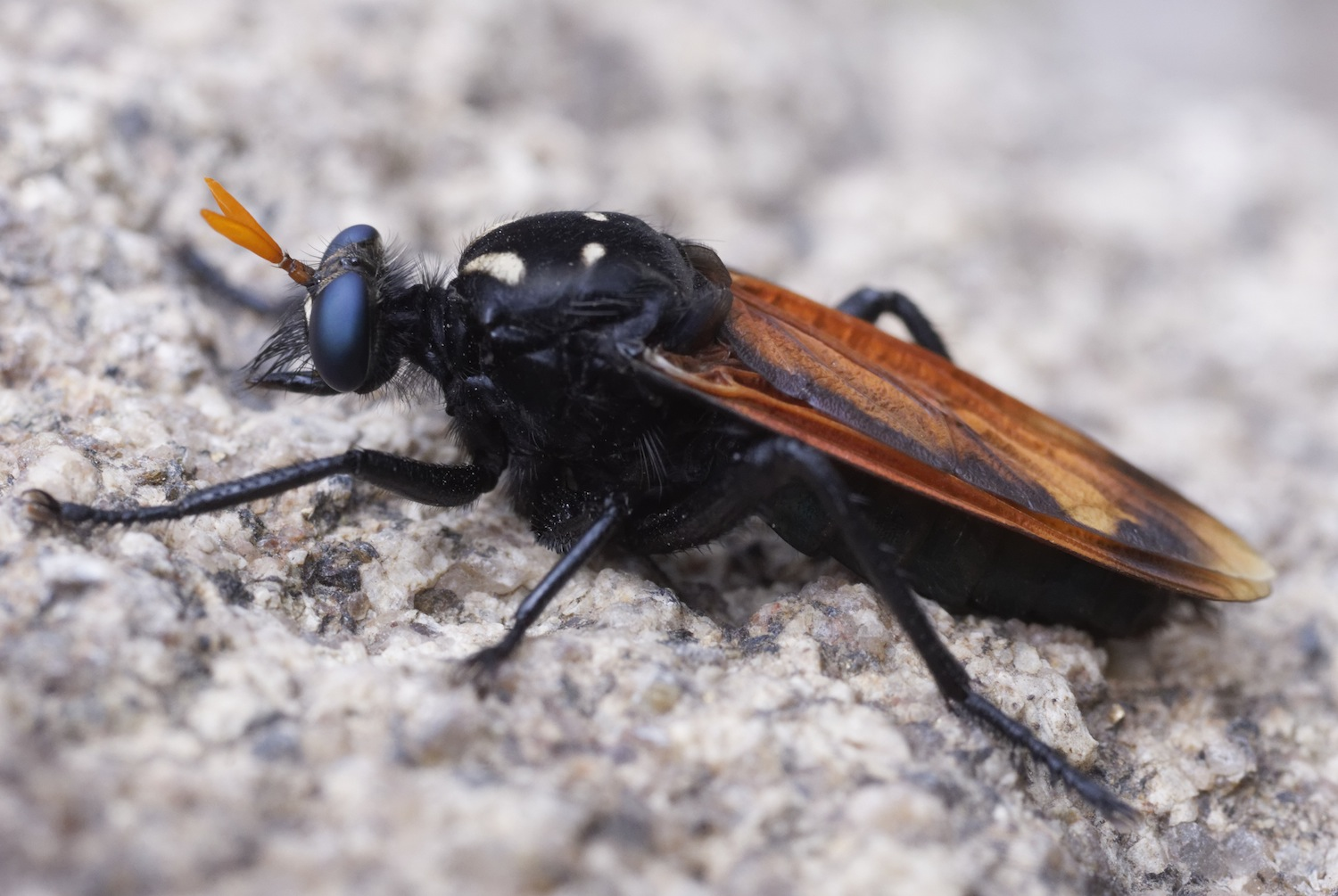
Female adult of Prolepsis lucifer photographed in Reserva Natural Parque San Martin, Cordoba, Argentina

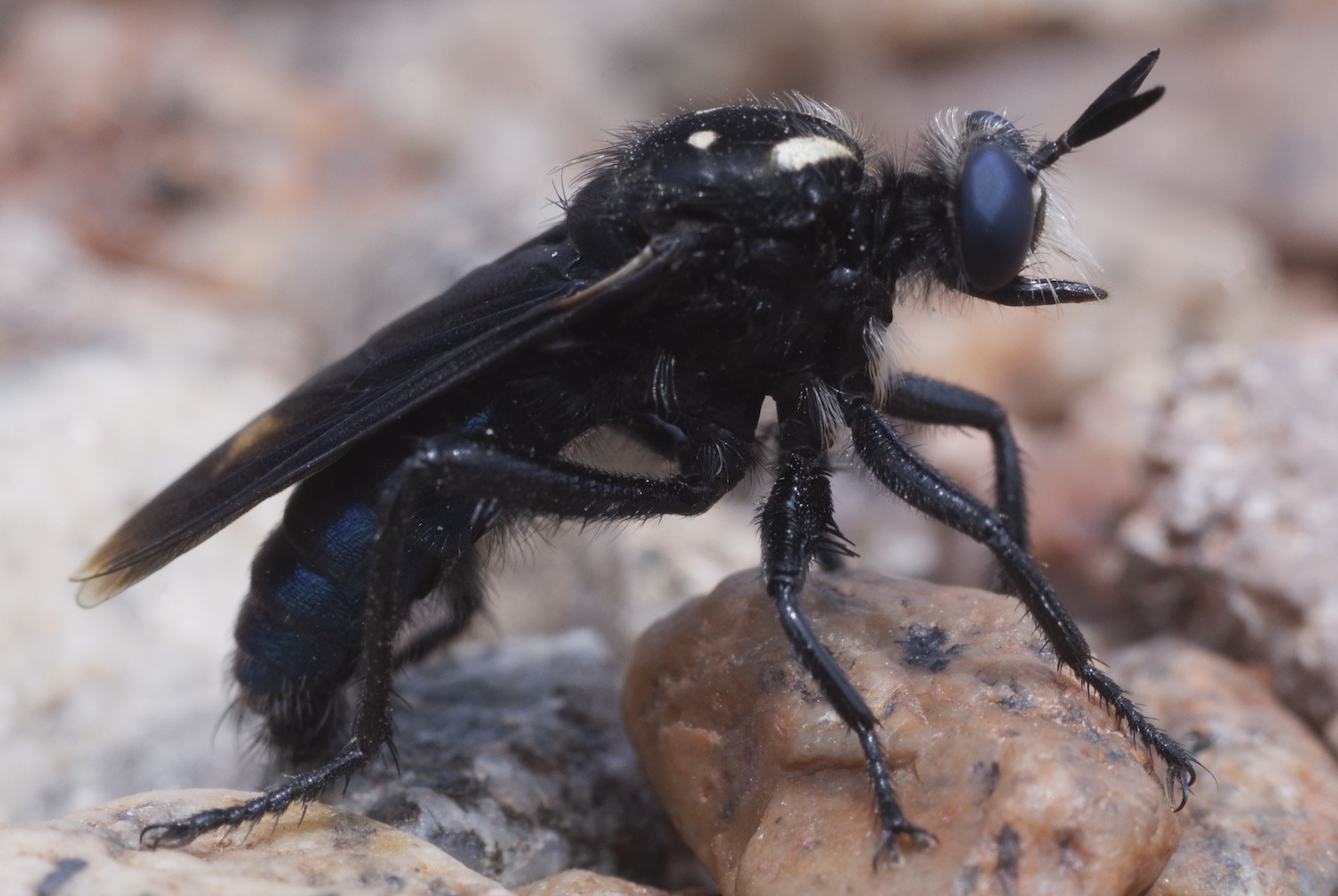
Male adult of Prolepsis lucifer photographed in Reserva Natural Parque San Martin, Cordoba, Argentina

=== Genus Prolepsis ===
- Prolepsis chalcoprocta (Loew, 1866) (Cuba)
- Prolepsis colalao (Lamas, 1973) (Argentina)
- Prolepsis costaricensis (Lamas, 1973) (Costa Rica)
- Prolepsis crabroniformis (Schiner, 1867)
- Prolepsis elotensis (Martin, 1966) (Mexico)
- Prolepsis fax (Lynch Arribalzaga, 1881)
- Prolepsis fenestrata (Macquart, 1838)
- Prolepsis funebris (Lamas, 1973) (Brazil)
- Prolepsis huatajata (Lamas, 1973)
- Prolepsis indecisa (Lamas, 1973) (Argentina)
- Prolepsis lucifer (Wiedemann, 1828) (Argentina)
- Prolepsis martini (Lamas, 1973) (Argentina)
- Prolepsis pluto (Lynch Arribalzaga, 1881)
- Prolepsis pseudopluto (Lamas, 1973) (Argentina)
- Prolepsis rosariana (Carrera, 1959) (Argentina, Brazil)
- Prolepsis sandaraca (Martin, 1966) (Mexico)
- Prolepsis tristis (Walker, 1851) (Mexico, USA)

=== Genus Promachella ===
- Promachella pilosa (Wilcox, 1937)

=== Genus Promachus ===
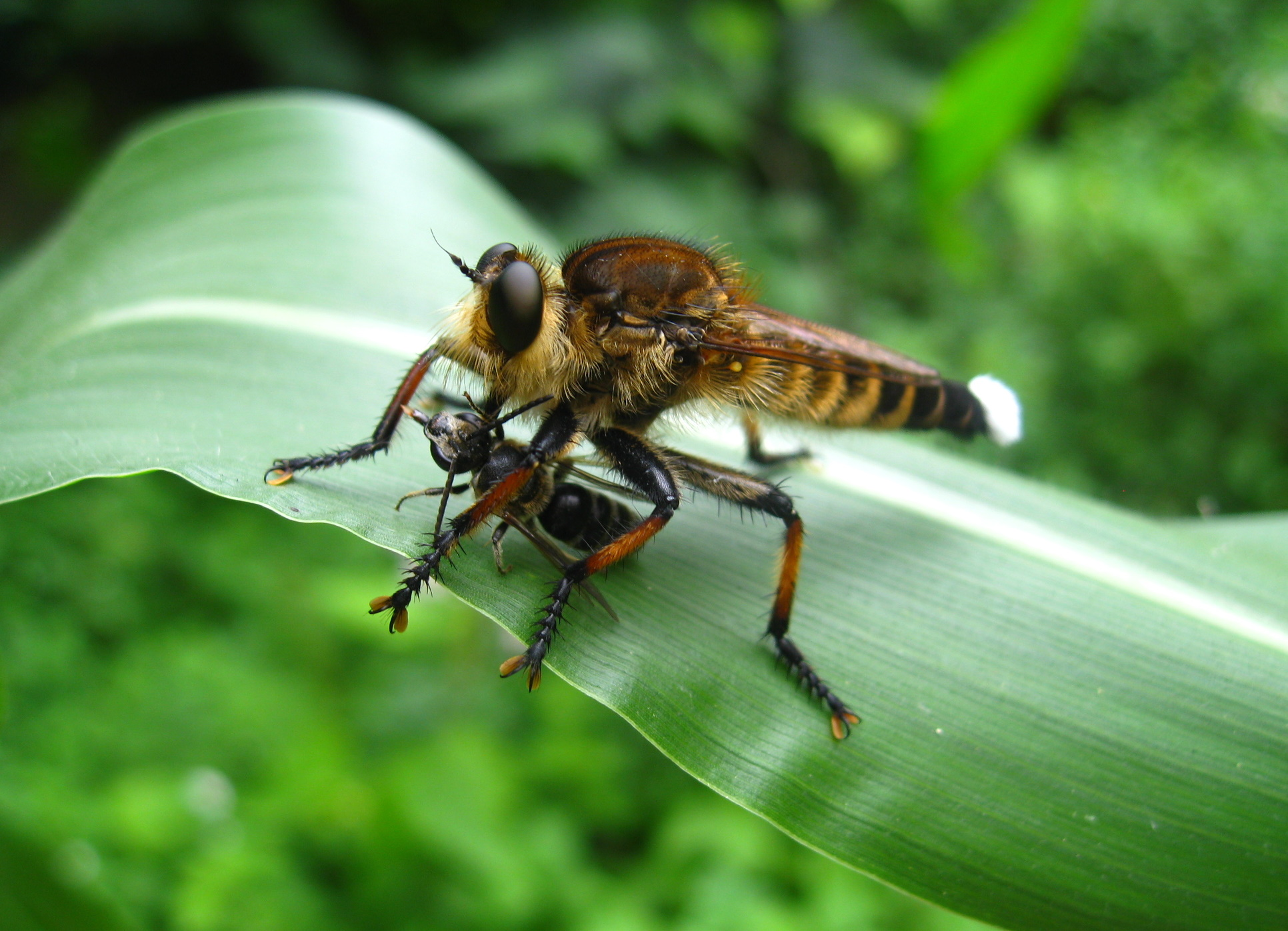
Promachus yesonicus

- Promachus abdominalis (Ricardo, 1920)
- Promachus absterrens (Oldroyd, 1960)
- Promachus acuminatus (Hobby, 1936)
- Promachus aedithus (Walker, 1849)
- Promachus aegyptiacus (Efflatoun, 1929)
- Promachus aequalis (Loew, 1858)
- Promachus albicinctus (Ricardo, 1900)
- Promachus aldrichii (Hine, 1911)
- Promachus amorges (Walker, 1849)
- Promachus anceps (Osten-Sacken, 1887)
- Promachus anicius (Walker, 1849)
- Promachus apicalis (Macquart, 1838)
- Promachus apivorus (Walker, 1860)
- Promachus argentipennis (Efflatoun, 1929)
- Promachus argentipes (Meijere, 1913)
- Promachus argyropus (Bezzi, 1906)
- Promachus ater (Coquillett, 1899)
- Promachus atrox (Bromley, 1940)
- Promachus aurulans (Lindner, 1955)
- Promachus barbatus (Doleschall, 1857)
- Promachus beesoni (Ricardo, 1921)
- Promachus binghamensis (Ricardo, 1921)
- Promachus binucleatus (Bezzi, 1908)
- Promachus bomensis (Curran, 1927)
- Promachus bottegoi (Corti, 1895)
- Promachus brevipennis (Ricardo, 1920)
- Promachus breviventris (Ricardo, 1920)
- Promachus caffer (Macquart, 1846)
- Promachus calanus (Walker, 1851)
- Promachus captans (Walker, 1851)
- Promachus carpenteri (Hobby, 1936)
- Promachus ceylanicus (Macquart, 1838)
- Promachus chalcops (Speiser, 1910)
- Promachus chinensis (Ricardo, 1920)
- Promachus cinctus (Bellardi, 1861)
- Promachus cinereus (Ricardo, 1925)
- Promachus clausus (Macquart, 1846)
- Promachus clavigerus (Bromley, 1931)
- Promachus complens (Walker, 1861)
- Promachus conradti (Hobby, 1936)
- Promachus consanguineus (Macquart, 1838)
- Promachus contractus (Walker, 1851)
- Promachus cristatus (Oldroyd, 1960)
- Promachus cypricus (Rondani, 1856)
- Promachus desmopygus (Meijere, 1914)
- Promachus dimidiatus (Curran, 1927)
- Promachus djanetianus (Séguy, 1938)
- Promachus doddi (Ricardo, 1913)
- Promachus duvaucelii (Macquart, 1838)
- Promachus entebbensis (Hobby, 1936)
- Promachus enucleatus (Karsch, 1888)
- Promachus erythrosceles (Hobby, 1936)
- Promachus fasciatus (Fabricius, 1775)
- Promachus felinus (Wulp, 1872)
- Promachus flavopilosus (Ricardo, 1920)
- Promachus floccosus (Kirby, 1884)
- Promachus forcipatus (Schiner, 1868)
- Promachus forfex (Osten-Sacken, 1887)
- Promachus formosanus (Matsumura, 1916)
- Promachus fraterculus (Walker, 1855)
- Promachus fulviventris (Becker, 1925)
- Promachus fuscipennis (Macquart, 1846)
- Promachus fusiformis (Walker, 1856)
- Promachus genitalis (Joseph & Parui, 1997)
- Promachus ghumtiensis (Bromley, 1935)
- Promachus giganteus (Hine, 1911)
- Promachus gomerae (Frey, 1937)
- Promachus grandis (Macquart, 1838)
- Promachus grossypiatus (Speiser, 1910)
- Promachus guineensis (Wiedemann, 1824)
- Promachus heteropterus (Macquart, 1838)
- Promachus hinei (Bromley, 1931)
- Promachus hirsutus (Ricardo, 1925)
- Promachus horishanus (Matsumura, 1916)
- Promachus hypocaustus (Oldroyd, 1972)
- Promachus hypoleucochaeta (Bezzi, 1908)
- Promachus indicus (Joseph & Parui, 1997)
- Promachus indigenus (Becker, 1925)
- Promachus jabalpurensis (Joseph & Parui, 1997)
- Promachus knutsoni (Joseph & Parui, 1997)
- Promachus laciniosus (Becker, 1907)
- Promachus latitarsatus (Macquart, 1839)
- Promachus lehri (Joseph & Parui, 1997)
- Promachus lemur (Bromley, 1931)
- Promachus leoninus (Loew, 1848)
- Promachus leucopareus (Wulp, 1872)
- Promachus leucopygus (Walker, 1857)
- Promachus leucotrichodes (Bigot, 1892)
- Promachus maculosus (Macquart, 1834)
- Promachus madagascarensis (Bromley, 1942)
- Promachus magnus (Bellardi, 1861)
- Promachus manilliensis (Macquart, 1838)
- Promachus marcii (Macquart, 1838)
- Promachus mediospinosus (Speiser, 1913)
- Promachus melampygus (Wulp, 1872)
- Promachus mesorrhachis (Hobby, 1936)
- Promachus metoxus (Oldroyd, 1939)
- Promachus microlabis (Loew, 1857)
- Promachus minusculus (Hine, 1911)
- Promachus mustela (Loew, 1854)
- Promachus neavei (Hobby, 1936)
- Promachus neligens (Adams, 1905)
- Promachus nicobarensis (Schiner, 1868)
- Promachus nigripennis (Hobby, 1933)
- Promachus nigropilosus (Schaeffer, 1916)
- Promachus niveicinctus (Hobby, 1936)
- Promachus nobilis (Osten-Sacken, 1887)
- Promachus noninterponens (Ricardo, 1920)
- Promachus noscibilis (Austen, 1915)
- Promachus nussus (Oldroyd, 1972)
- Promachus obscuripes (Ricardo, 1920)
- Promachus obscurus (Joseph & Parui, 1997)
- Promachus oklahomensis (Pritchard, 1935)
- Promachus opacus (Becker, 1925)
- Promachus orientalis (Macquart, 1838)
- Promachus painteri (Bromley, 1934)
- Promachus pallidus (Ricardo, 1921)
- Promachus palmensis (Frey, 1937)
- Promachus parvus (Bromley, 1931)
- †Promachus paucinervis (Zhang, 1994)
- Promachus philipinus (Ricardo, 1920)
- Promachus plutonicus (Walker, 1861)
- Promachus poetinus (Walker, 1849)
- Promachus pontifax (Karsch, 1888)
- Promachus princeps (Williston, 1885)
- Promachus productus (Walker, 1851)
- Promachus pseudocontractus (Joseph & Parui, 1997)
- Promachus pseudomaculatus (Ricardo, 1920)
- Promachus quadratus (Wiedemann, 1821)
- Promachus ramakrishnai (Bromley, 1939)
- Promachus rapax (Gerstaecker, 1871)
- Promachus rex (Karsch, 1888)
- Promachus rhopalocera (Karsch, 1888)
- Promachus robertii (Macquart, 1838)
- Promachus rondanii Oldroyd, 1975
- Promachus rubripes (Macquart, 1834)
- Promachus rueppelli Loew, 1854
- Promachus rufescens (Ricardo, 1920)
- Promachus rufibarbis (Macquart, 1848)
- Promachus rufihumeralis (Hobby, 1933)
- Promachus rufimystaceus (Macquart, 1849)
- Promachus rufipes (Fabricius, 1775)
- Promachus rufoangulatus (Macquart, 1838)
- Promachus rufotibialis (Hobby, 1936)
- Promachus sackeni (Hine, 1911)
- Promachus scalaris (Loew, 1858)
- Promachus scotti (Oldroyd, 1940)
- Promachus senegalensis (Macquart, 1838)
- Promachus simpsoni (Ricardo, 1920)
- Promachus sinaiticus (Efflatoun, 1934)
- Promachus smithi (Parui & Joseph, 1994)
- Promachus snowi (Hobby, 1940)
- Promachus sokotrae (Ricardo, 1903)
- Promachus speiseri (Hobby, 1936)
- Promachus spissibarbis (Macquart, 1846)
- Promachus subtilis (Bromley, 1935)
- Promachus superfluus (Oldroyd, 1972)
- Promachus tasmanensis (Macquart, 1847)
- Promachus tewfiki (Efflatoun, 1929)
- Promachus texanus (Bromley, 1934)
- Promachus transactus (Walker, 1864)
- Promachus transvaalensis (Hobby, 1933)
- Promachus trichozonus (Loew, 1858)
- Promachus triflagellatus (Frey, 1923)
- Promachus tristis (Bigot, 1892)
- Promachus triumphans (Bezzi, 1928)
- Promachus truquii (Bellardi, 1861)
- Promachus turinus (Walker, 1849)
- Promachus ugandiensis (Ricardo, 1920)
- Promachus vagator (Wiedemann, 1828)
- Promachus varipes (Macquart, 1838)
- Promachus venatrix (Hobby, 1936)
- Promachus venustus (Carrera & Andretta, 1950)
- Promachus versicolor (Hobby, 1936)
- Promachus vertebratus (Say, 1823)
- Promachus vexator (Becker, 1908)
- Promachus viridiventris (Macquart, 1855)
- Promachus westermannii (Macquart, 1838)
- Promachus wollastoni (Hobby, 1936)
- Promachus xanthostoma (Wulp, 1872)
- Promachus xanthotrichus (Bezzi, 1908)
- Promachus yerburiensis (Ricardo, 1920)
- Promachus yesonicus (Bigot, 1887) (or shioya-abu (シオヤアブ) in Japanese)
- Promachus zenkeri (Hobby, 1936)

=== Genus Pronomopsis ===
- Pronomopsis chalybea (Hermann, 1912)
- Pronomopsis pseudorubripes (Lamas, 1972)
- Pronomopsis rubripes (Hermann, 1912)
- Pronomopsis talabrensis (Artigas, 1964)

=== Genus Protometer ===
- Protometer bokermanni (Artigas & Papavero, 1997)
- Protometer evae (Artigas & Papavero, 1997)

=== Genus Pseuderemisca ===
- Pseuderemisca aestivalis (Lehr, 1964)
- Pseuderemisca chinensis (Lehr, 1964)
- Pseuderemisca dipogon (Lehr, 1964)
- Pseuderemisca gorodkovi (Lehr, 1964)

=== Genus Pseudomerodontina ===
- Pseudomerodontina alata (Scarbrough & Hill, 2000)
- Pseudomerodontina indica (Joseph & Parui, 1997)
- Pseudomerodontina jayaraji (Joseph & Parui, 1997)

=== Genus Pseudonusa ===
- Pseudonusa andhraensis (Joseph & Parui, 1997)

=== Genus Pseudorus ===
- Pseudorus conspectus (Tomasovic, 2001)
- Pseudorus dandrettae (Carrera, 1949)
- Pseudorus hermanni (Carrera, 1949)
- Pseudorus holocephalinus (Papavero, 1975)
- Pseudorus martini (Papavero, 1975)
- Pseudorus mexicanus (Bromley, 1951)
- Pseudorus piceus (Walker, 1851)

=== Genus Psilocurus ===
- Psilocurus blascoi (Weinberg & Bächli, 2001)
- Psilocurus camposi (Curran, 1931)
- Psilocurus caudatus (Williston, 1901)
- Psilocurus modestus (Williston, 1893)
- Psilocurus negrus (Lehr, 1974)
- Psilocurus nudiusculus (Loew, 1874)
- Psilocurus puellus (Bromley, 1934)
- Psilocurus pygmaeus (Hull, 1961)
- Psilocurus reinhardi (Bromley, 1951)
- Psilocurus tibialis (Hull, 1961)

=== Genus Psilonyx ===
- Psilonyx annuliventris (Hsia, 1949)
- Psilonyx arawak (Farr, 1963)
- Psilonyx flavican (Shi, 1993)
- Psilonyx hsiai (Shi, 1993)
- Psilonyx nigricoxa (Hsia, 1949)
- Psilonyx venustus (Bromley, 1929)
- Psilonyx zephyrus (Scarbrough, )

=== Genus Psilozona ===
- Psilozona albitarsis (Ricardo, 1912)
- Psilozona bancrofti (Paramonov, 1966)
- Psilozona lukinsi (Paramonov, 1966)
- Psilozona nigripennis (Paramonov, 1966)
- Psilozona nigritarsis (Ricardo, 1912)

=== Genus Pteralbis ===
- Pteralbis borburatensis (Ayala, 1981)
- Pteralbis jolyi (Ayala, 1981)
- Pteralbis peregrinus (Carrera & Machado-Allison, 1963)

=== Genus Pycnomerinx ===
- Pycnomerinx gweta (Oldroyd, 1974)

=== Genus Pycnopogon ===
- Pycnopogon apicalis (Matsumura, 1916)
- Pycnopogon denudatus (Séguy, 1949)
- Pycnopogon fasciculatus (Loew, 1847)
- Pycnopogon hirsutus (Becker, 1913)
- Pycnopogon laniger (Dufour, 1833)
- Pycnopogon leucostomus (Engel, 1930)
- Pycnopogon melanostomus (Loew, 1874)
- Pycnopogon nikkoensis (Matsumura, 1916)

=== Genus Pygommatius ===
- Pygommatius alatipes (Scarbrough & Marascia, 2003)
- Pygommatius albatus (Martin, 1964)
- Pygommatius andamanensis (Joseph & Parui, 1983)
- Pygommatius anisoramus (Scarbrough & Hill, 2000)
- Pygommatius apoticius Scarbrough & Hill, 2005
- Pygommatius bingeri (Oldroyd, 1968)
- Pygommatius brevicornis (Curran, 1927)
- Pygommatius caligula (Oldroyd, 1970)
- Pygommatius calvus (Meijere, 1911)
- Pygommatius cingulatus (Bromley, 1936)
- Pygommatius comosus (Scarbrough & Marascia, 2003)
- Pygommatius daknistus (Oldroyd, 1972)
- Pygommatius dasypogon (Oldroyd, 1939)
- Pygommatius digittatus (Oldroyd, 1970)
- Pygommatius epicalus (Oldroyd, 1972)
- Pygommatius fluvius (Scarbrough & Marascia, 2003)
- Pygommatius grossus (Scarbrough & Marascia, 2003)
- Pygommatius gruwelli Scarbrough, 2007
- Pygommatius hocus (Oldroyd, 1972)
- Pygommatius hypnus (Oldroyd, 1972)
- Pygommatius imaginus (Scarbrough & Marascia, 2003)
- Pygommatius iriga Scarbrough & Hill, 2005
- Pygommatius jaculator (Walker, 1851)
- Pygommatius limbus (Scarbrough & Marascia, 2003)
- Pygommatius littoreus (Scarbrough & Marascia, 2003)
- Pygommatius lulua (Scarbrough & Marascia, 2003)
- Pygommatius magnipes (Scarbrough & Marascia, 2003)
- Pygommatius misamis Scarbrough & Hill, 2005
- Pygommatius montanus Scarbrough & Hill, 2005
- Pygommatius neglectus (Bromley, 1936)
- Pygommatius nicobarensis (Joseph & Parui, 1983)
- Pygommatius nilgiriensis (Joseph & Parui, 1989)
- Pygommatius pectinus (Scarbrough & Marascia, 2003)
- Pygommatius porticus (Scarbrough & Marascia, 2003)
- Pygommatius renudus (Scarbrough & Marascia, 2003)
- Pygommatius sagouensis (Scarbrough & Marascia, 2003)
- Pygommatius scinius (Oldroyd, 1972)
- Pygommatius strigiatus (Scarbrough & Marascia, 2003)
- Pygommatius talus (Scarbrough & Marascia, 2003)
- Pygommatius vultus (Scarbrough & Marascia, 2003)
