= P. mystaceus =

P. mystaceus may refer to:

- Phidippus mystaceus, a species in the genus Phidippus
- Phrynocephalus mystaceus, a species in the genus Phrynocephalus
- Platyrinchus mystaceus, a species in the genus Platyrinchus
- Proagonistes mystaceus, a species in the genus Proagonistes
