= Promachus fitchii =

Scientific classification
- Domain: Eukaryota
- Kingdom: Animalia
- Phylum: Arthropoda
- Class: Insecta
- Order: Diptera
- Family: Asilidae
- Genus: Promachus
- Species: P. fitchii

Binomial name
- Promachus fitchii Osten Sacken, 1878

Synonyms
- Trupanea apivora Fitch, 1864

Species of fly

Promachus fitchii is a species of robber flies (insects in the family Asilidae).
