= Promachus albifacies =

Scientific classification
- Kingdom: Animalia
- Phylum: Arthropoda
- Class: Insecta
- Order: Diptera
- Family: Asilidae
- Genus: Promachus
- Species: P. albifacies

Binomial name
- Promachus albifacies Williston, 1885

Species of fly

Promachus albifacies is a species of robber flies (insects in the family Asilidae).
