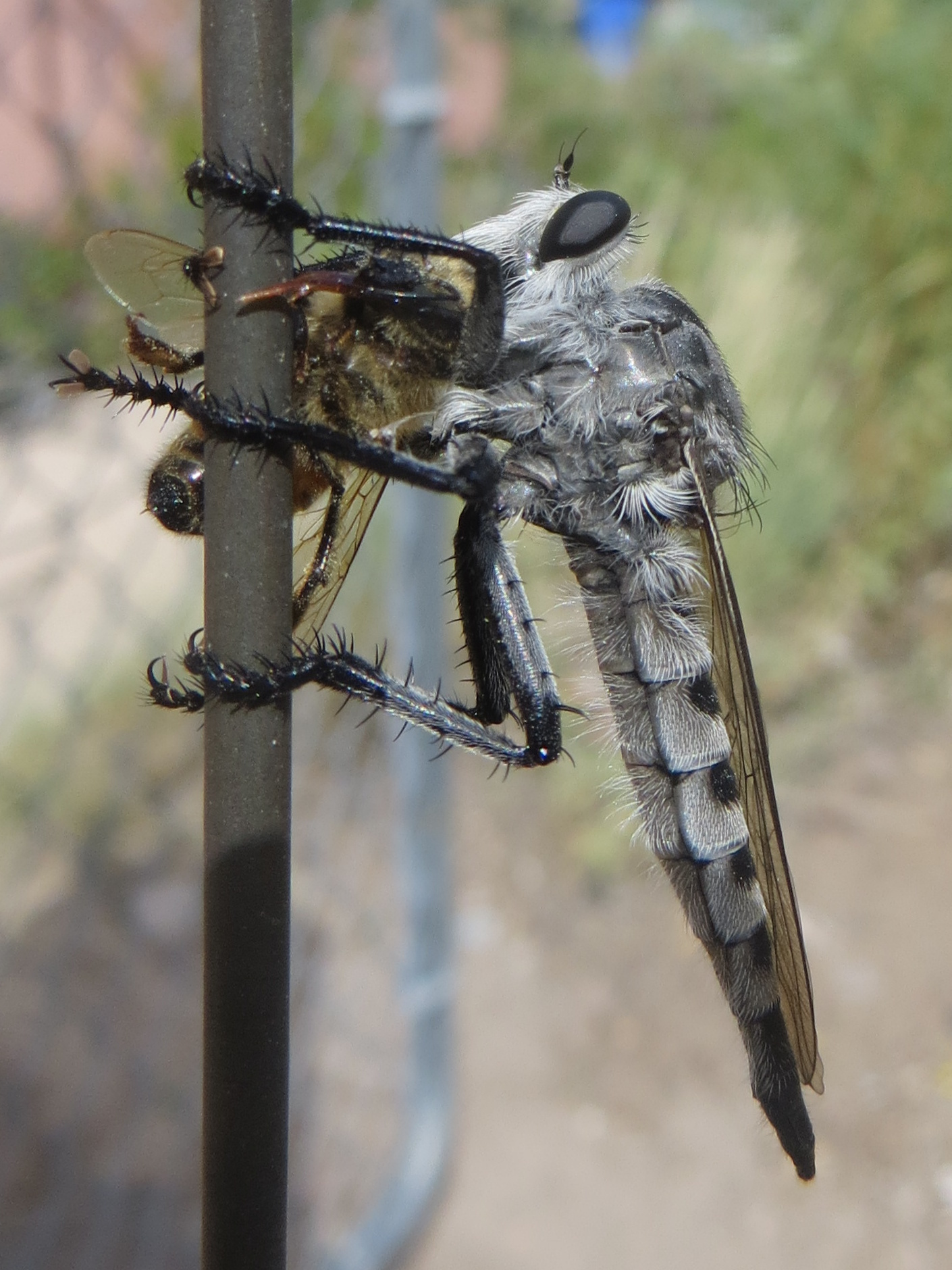

Scientific classification
- Domain: Eukaryota
- Kingdom: Animalia
- Phylum: Arthropoda
- Class: Insecta
- Order: Diptera
- Family: Asilidae
- Genus: Promachus
- Species: P. nigrialbus

Binomial name
- Promachus nigrialbus Martin, 1970

Synonyms
- Promachus nigripes Hine, 1911

= Promachus nigrialbus =

Species of fly

Promachus nigrialbus is a species of robber flies (insects in the family Asilidae).
