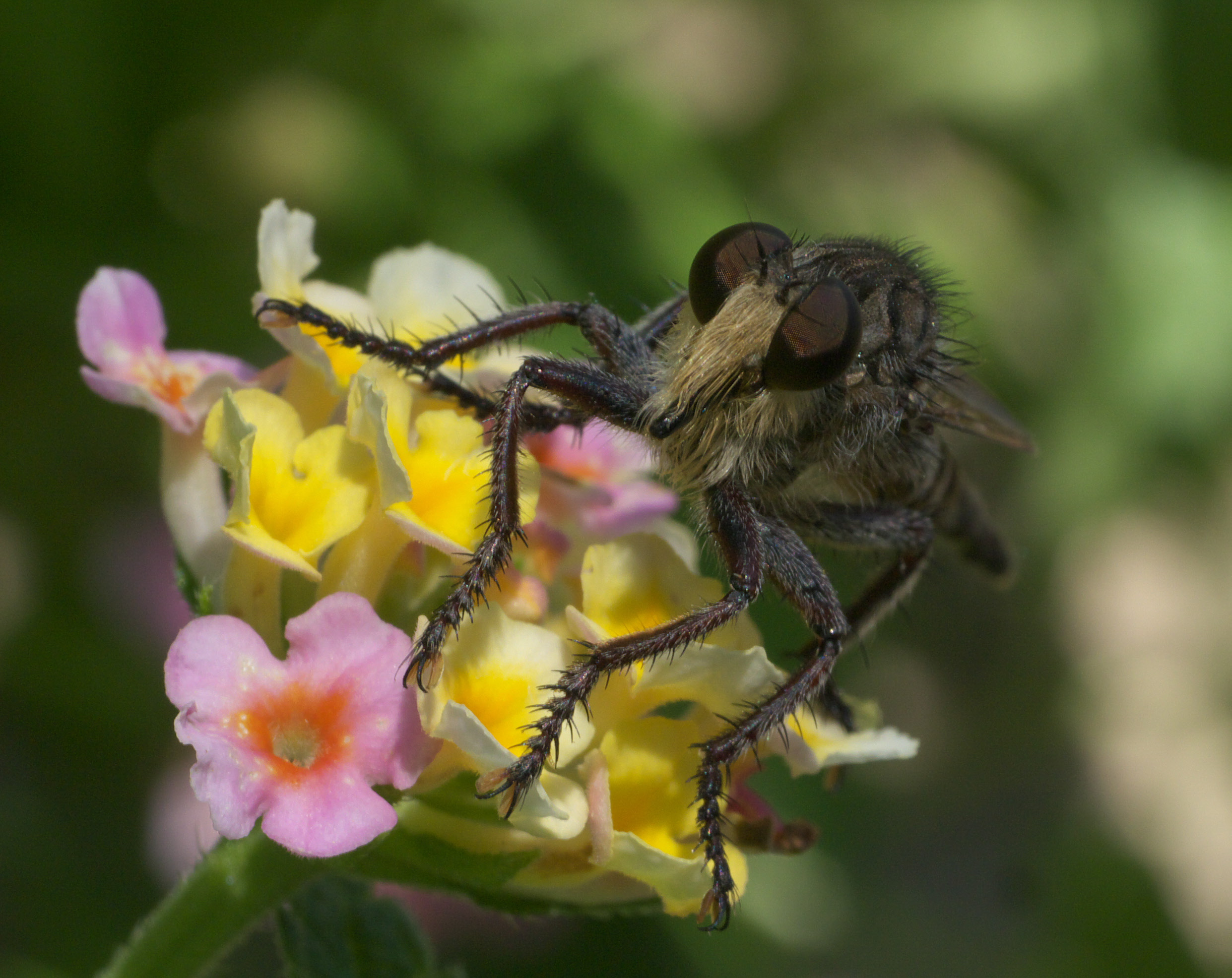

Scientific classification
- Domain: Eukaryota
- Kingdom: Animalia
- Phylum: Arthropoda
- Class: Insecta
- Order: Diptera
- Family: Asilidae
- Genus: Promachus
- Species: P. bastardii

Binomial name
- Promachus bastardii (Macquart, 1838)

Synonyms
- Asilus laevinus Walker, 1849; Asilus ultimus Walker, 1851; Promachus philadelphicus Schiner, 1867; Trupanea bastardii Macquart, 1838; Trupanea rubiginis Walker, 1851

= Promachus bastardii =

Species of fly

Promachus bastardii, the false bee-killer, is a species of robber flies (insects in the family Asilidae).

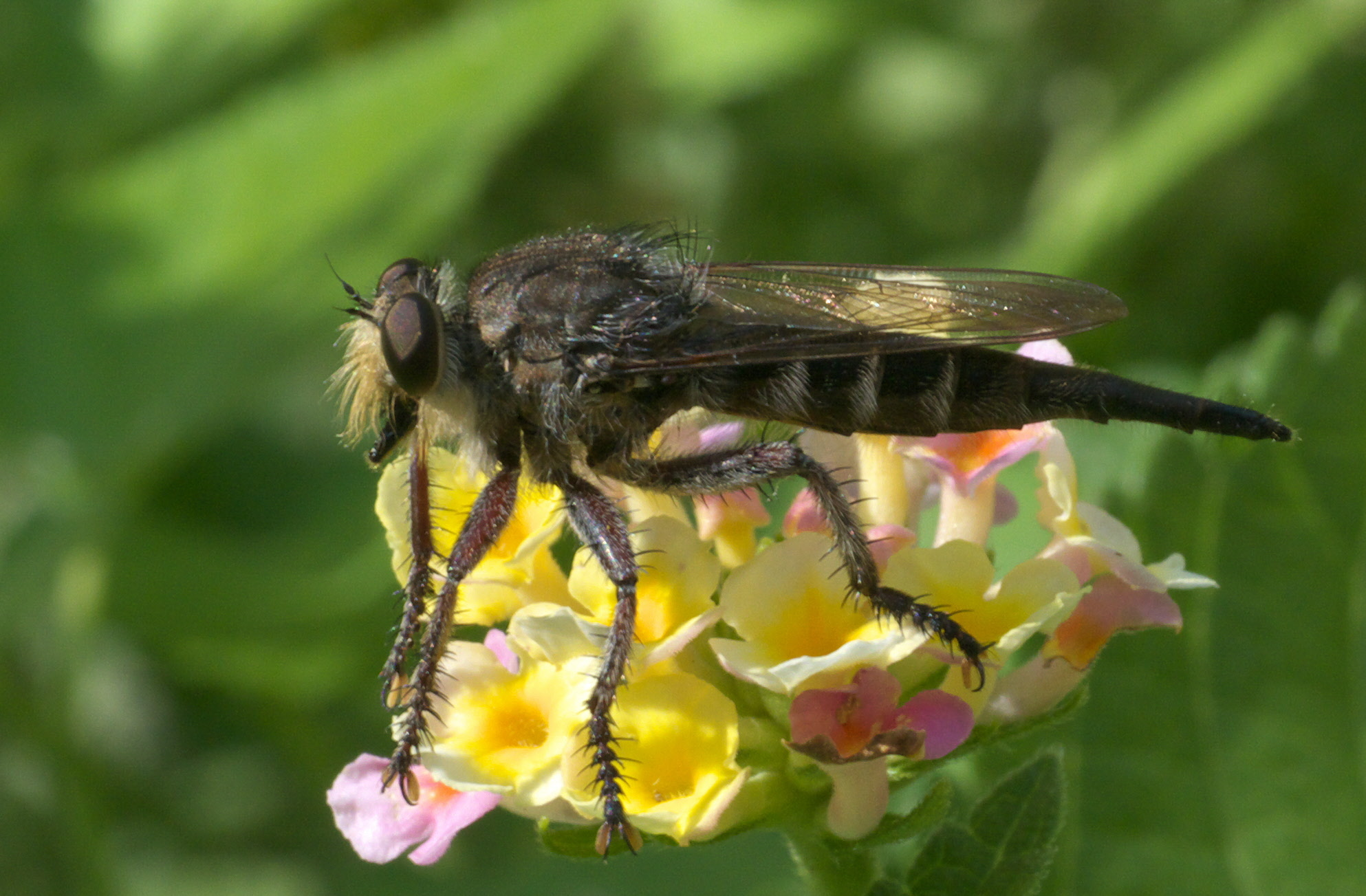
False bee-killer, Promachus bastardii
