= Promachus truquii =

Scientific classification
- Kingdom: Animalia
- Phylum: Arthropoda
- Clade: Pancrustacea
- Class: Insecta
- Order: Diptera
- Family: Asilidae
- Genus: Promachus
- Species: P. truquii

Binomial name
- Promachus truquii Bellardi, 1861

Species of fly

Promachus truquii is a species of robber flies (insects in the family Asilidae).
