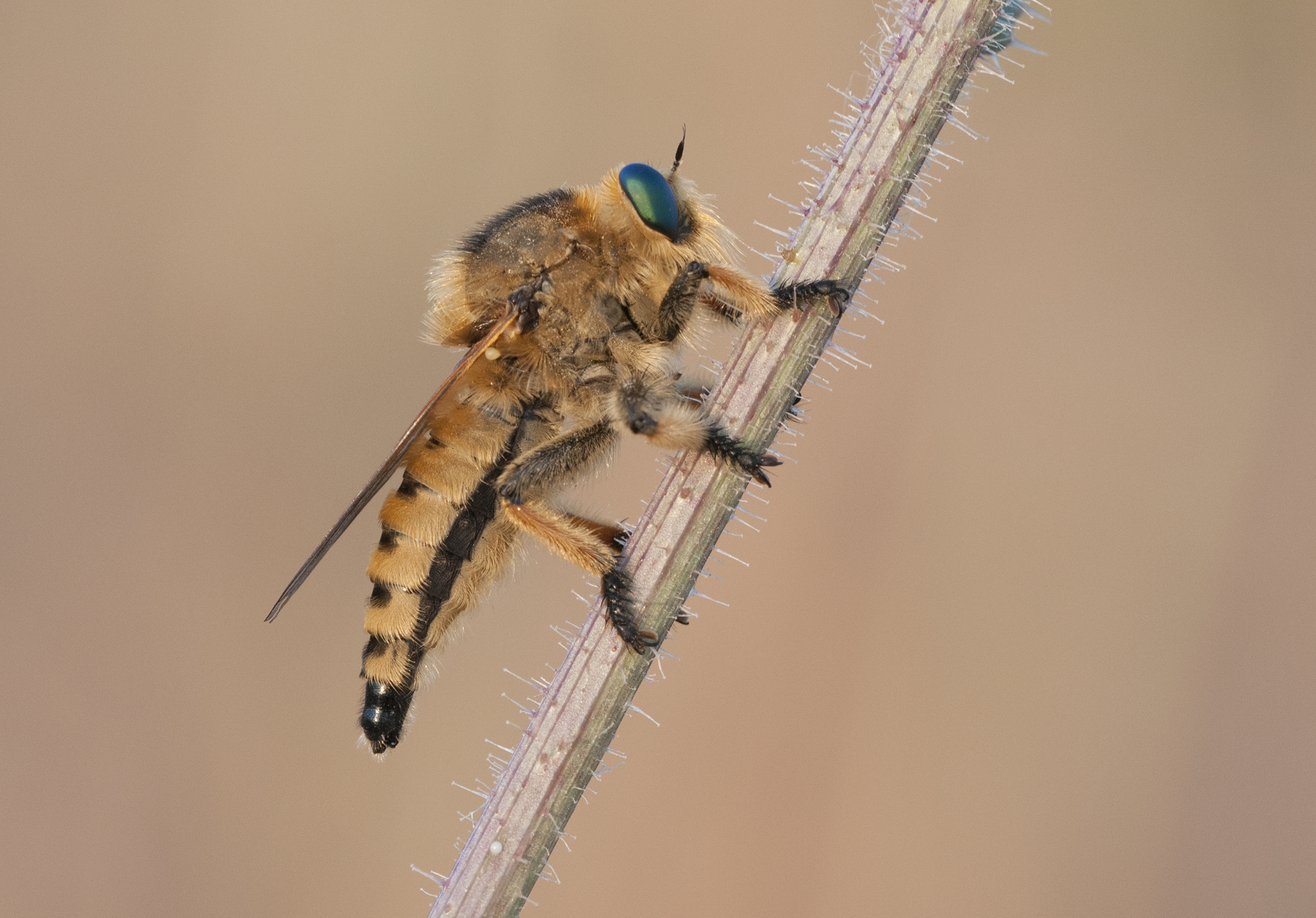

Scientific classification
- Domain: Eukaryota
- Kingdom: Animalia
- Phylum: Arthropoda
- Class: Insecta
- Order: Diptera
- Family: Asilidae
- Genus: Promachus
- Species: P. rufipes

Binomial name
- Promachus rufipes (Fabricius, 1775)

Synonyms
- Asilus rufipes Fabricius, 1775

= Promachus rufipes =

Species of fly

Promachus rufipes, known generally as the red-footed cannibalfly or bee panther, is a species of robber fly (insects in the family Asilidae).

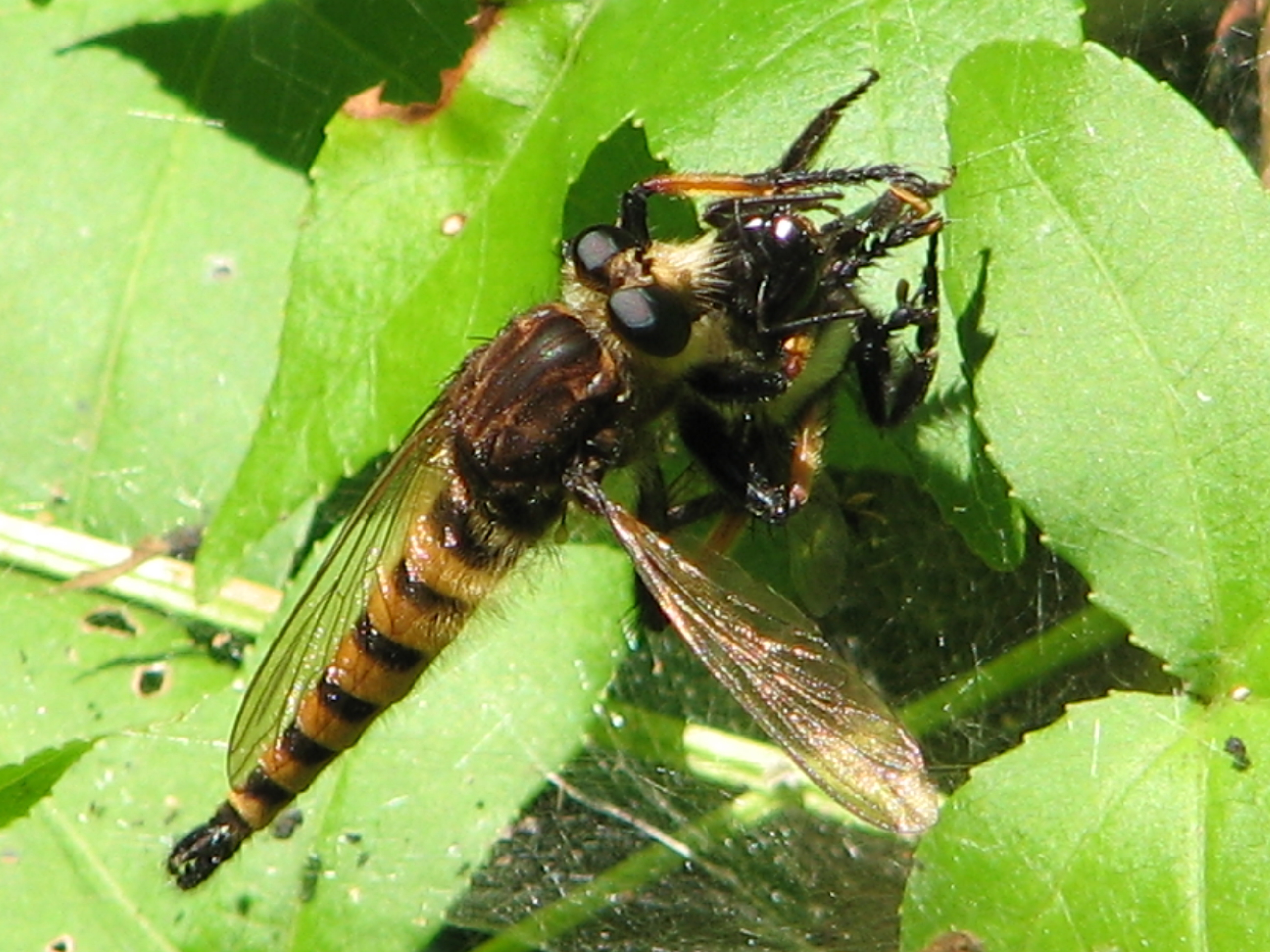
Red-footed cannibalfly, Promachus rufipes

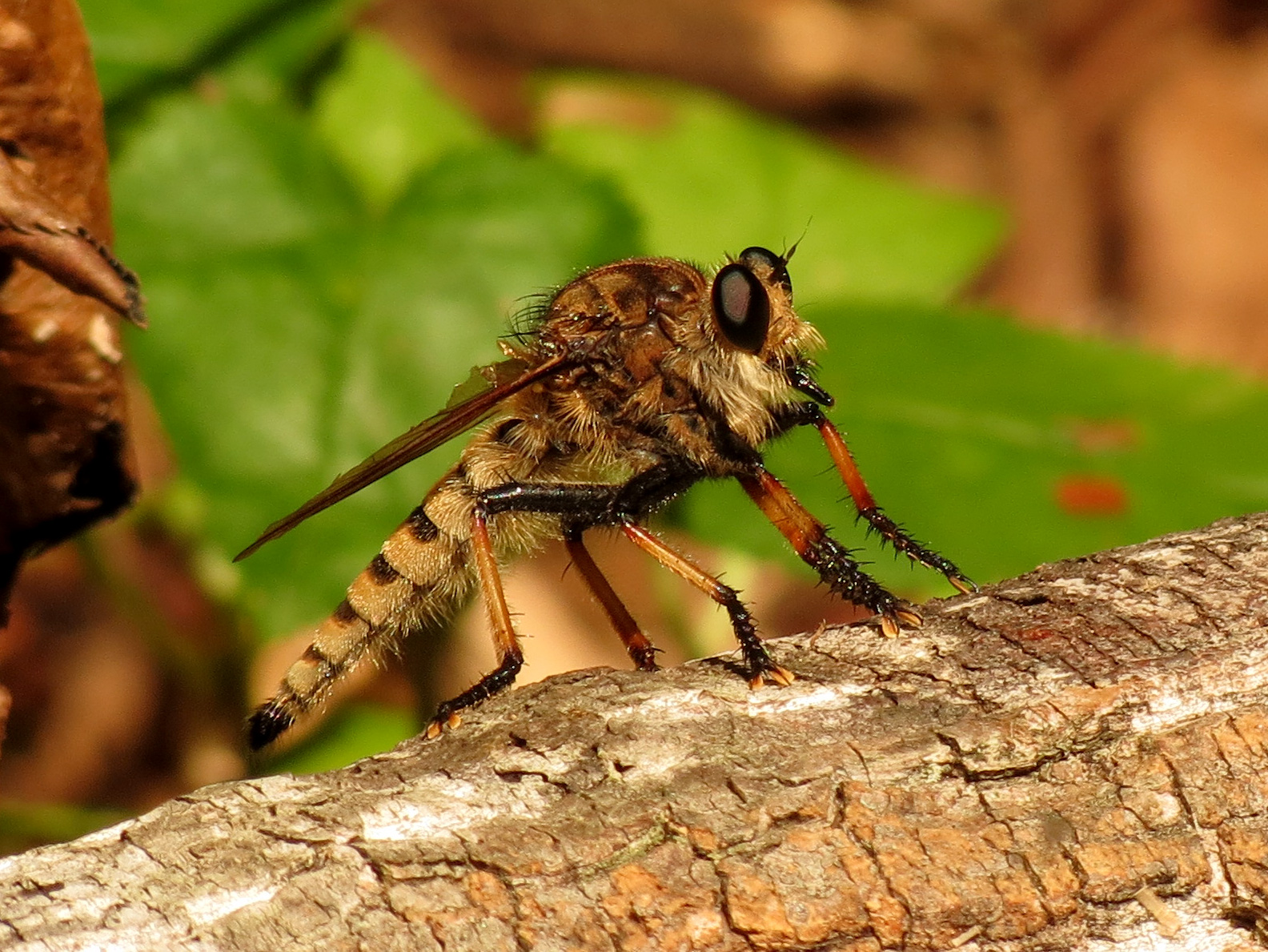
Red-footed cannibalfly, Promachus rufipes
