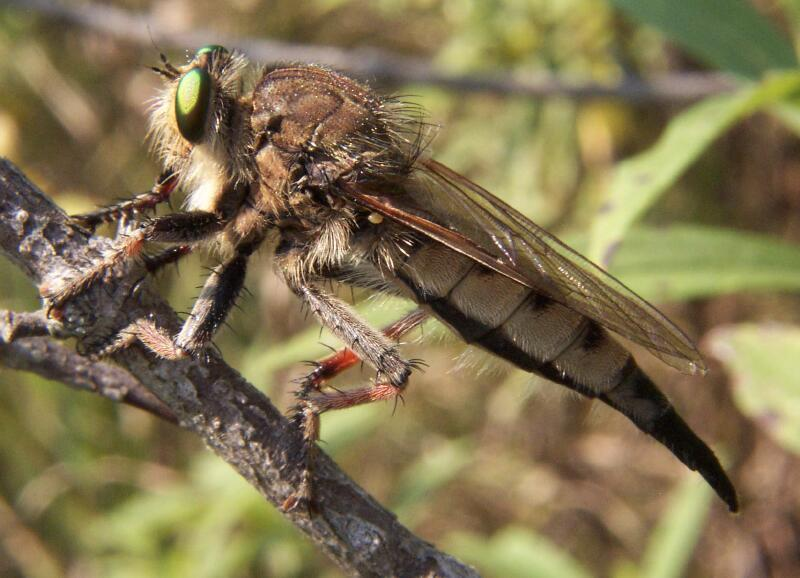

Scientific classification
- Domain: Eukaryota
- Kingdom: Animalia
- Phylum: Arthropoda
- Class: Insecta
- Order: Diptera
- Family: Asilidae
- Genus: Promachus
- Species: P. vertebratus

Binomial name
- Promachus vertebratus (Say, 1823)

Synonyms
- Asilus vertebratus Say, 1823

= Promachus vertebratus =

Species of fly

Promachus vertebratus is a species of robber flies (insects in the family Asilidae).
