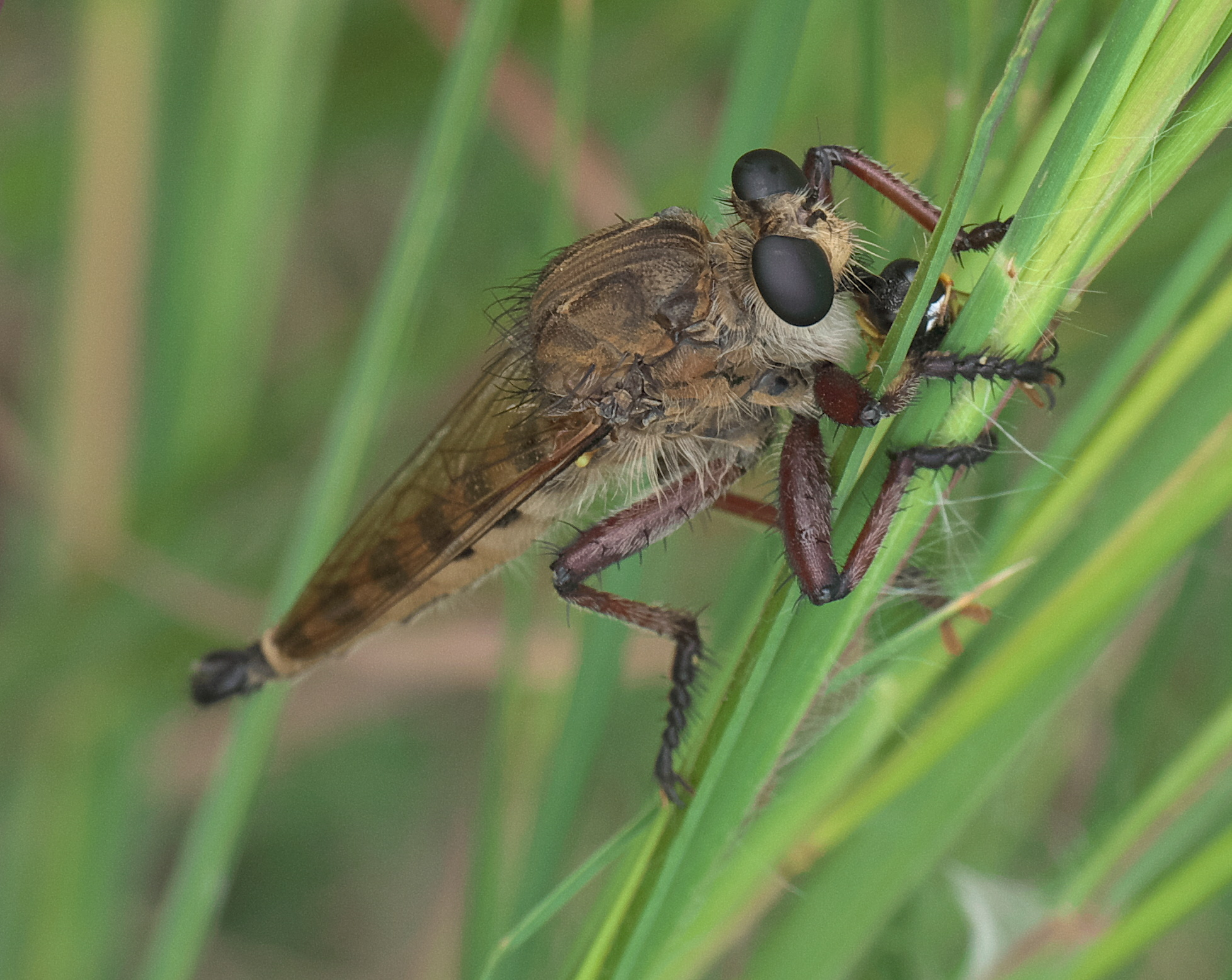

Scientific classification
- Domain: Eukaryota
- Kingdom: Animalia
- Phylum: Arthropoda
- Class: Insecta
- Order: Diptera
- Family: Asilidae
- Genus: Promachus
- Species: P. hinei

Binomial name
- Promachus hinei Bromley, 1931

= Promachus hinei =

Species of fly

Promachus hinei is a species of robber flies (insects in the family Asilidae).

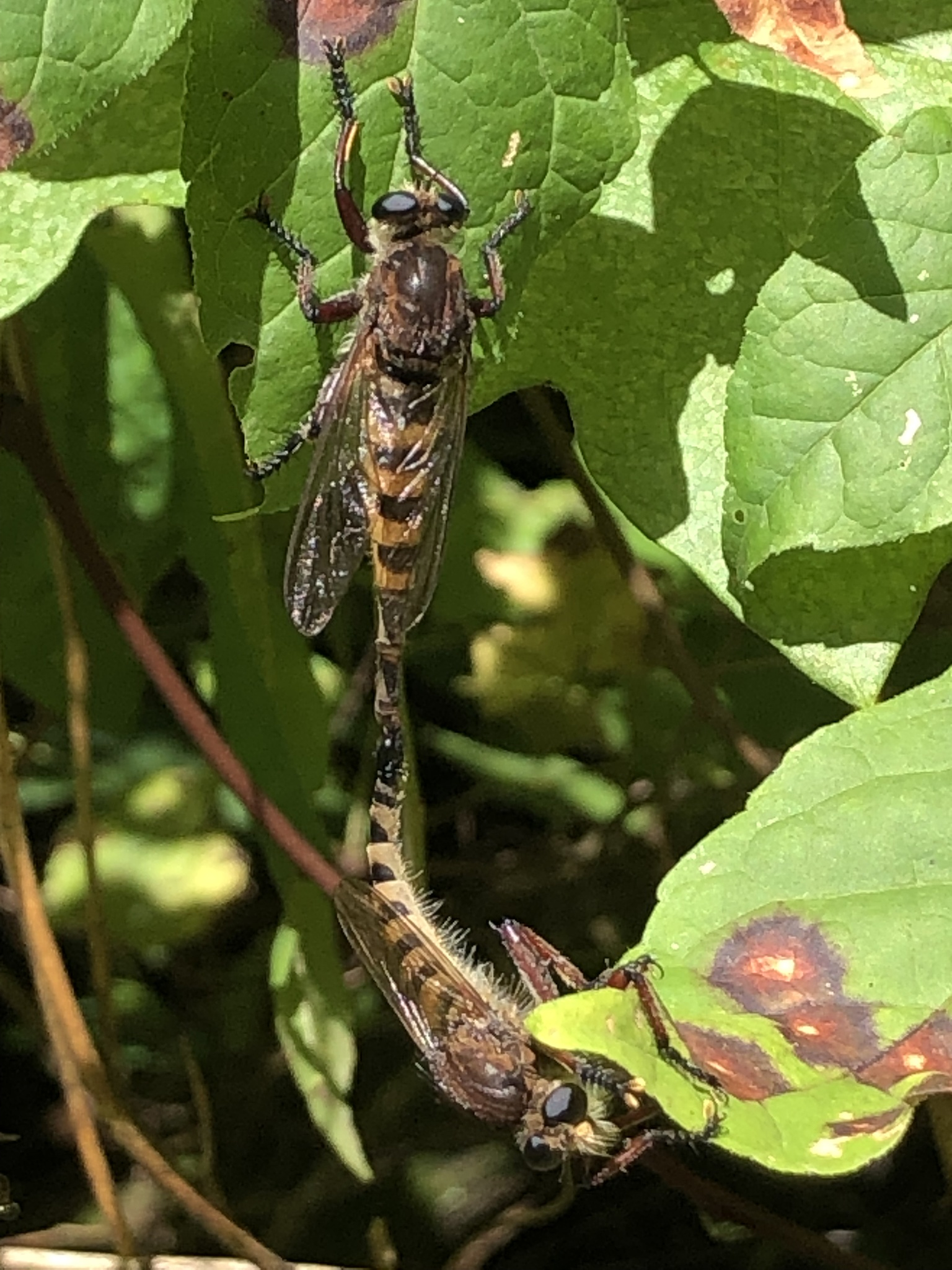
Male and female mating.
