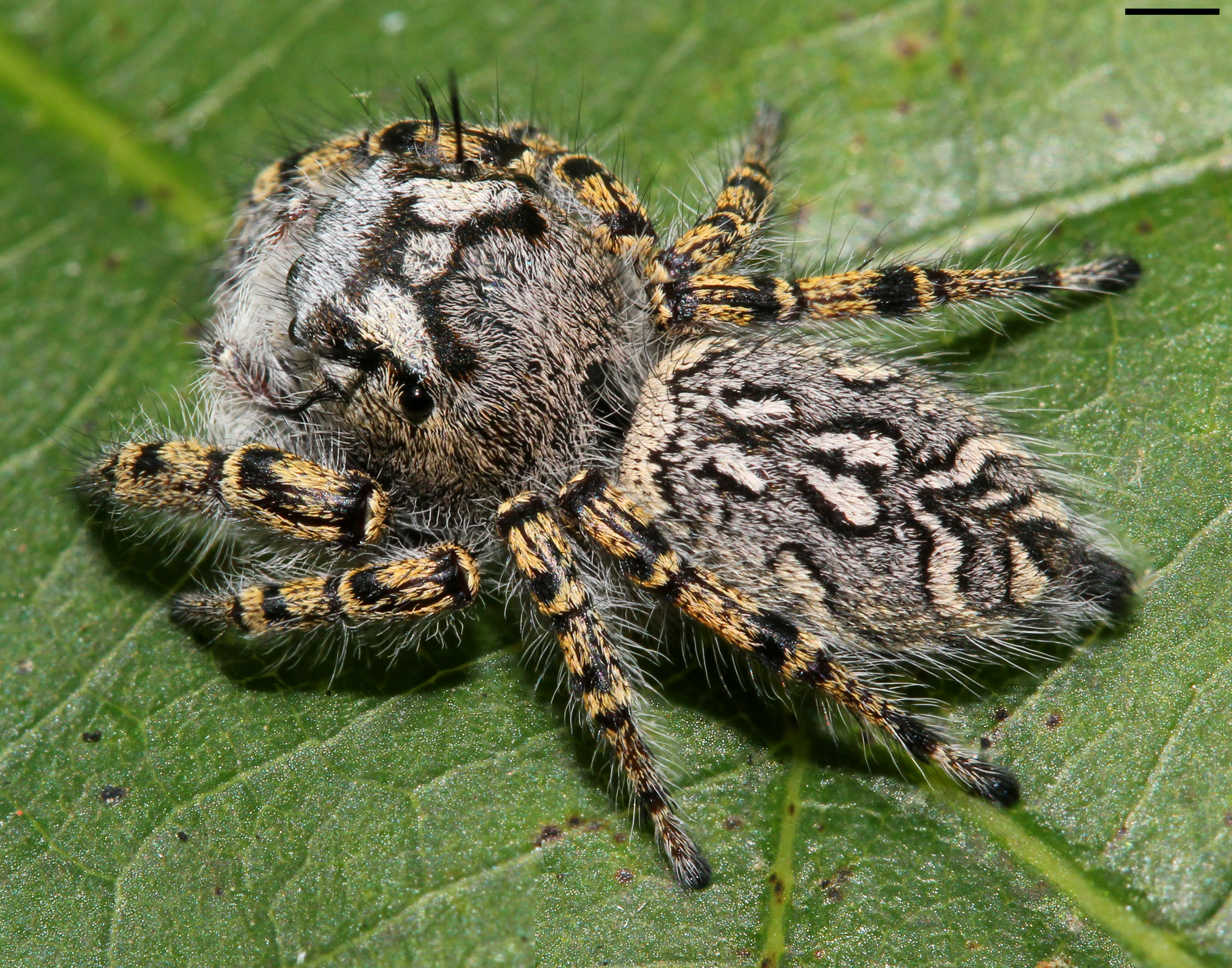
- Female
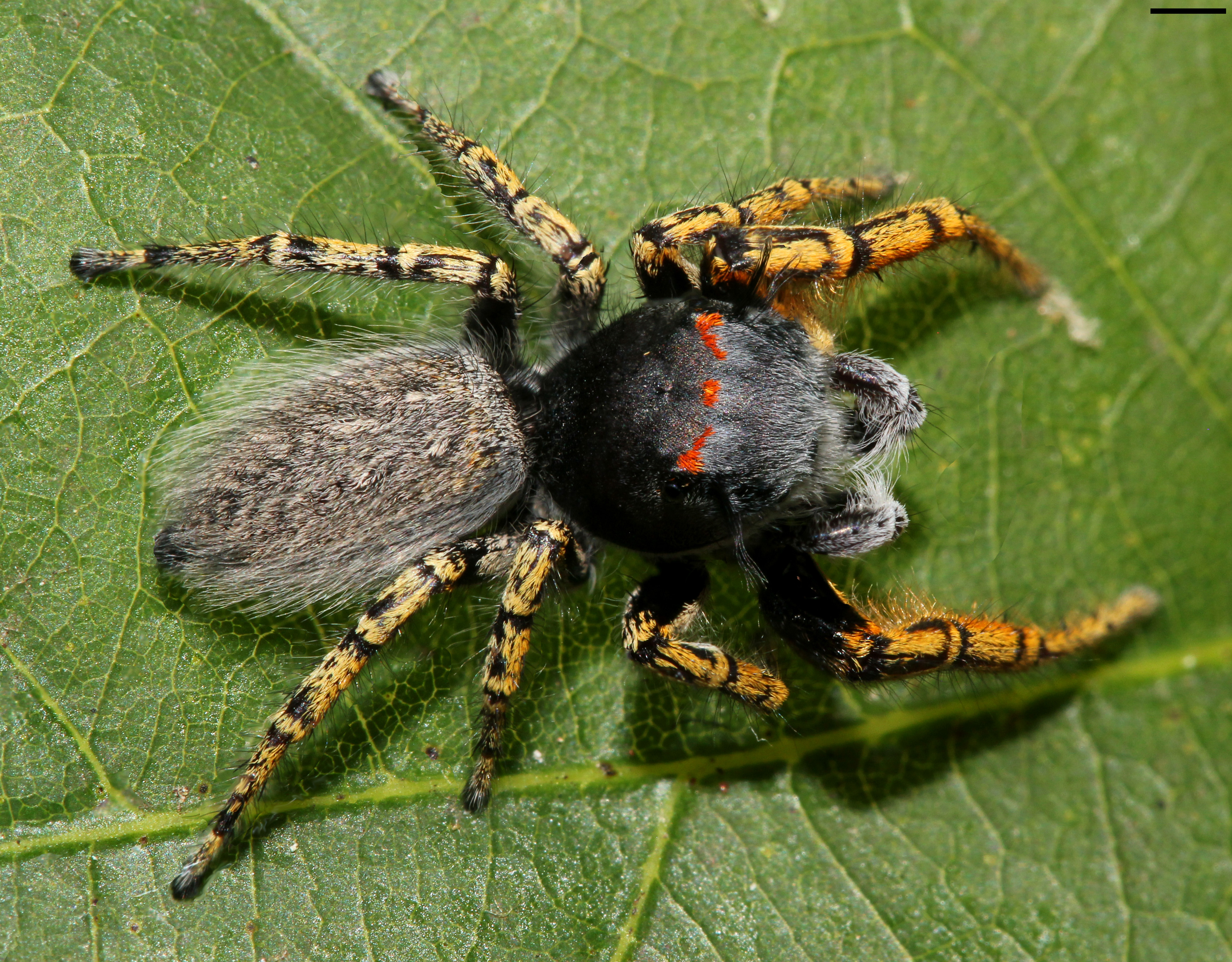
- Male

Scientific classification
- Kingdom: Animalia
- Phylum: Arthropoda
- Subphylum: Chelicerata
- Class: Arachnida
- Order: Araneae
- Infraorder: Araneomorphae
- Family: Salticidae
- Genus: Phidippus
- Species: P. mystaceus

Binomial name
- Phidippus mystaceus (Hentz, 1846)

Synonyms
- Attus mystaceus; Phidippus asinarius; Phidippus incertus; Dendryphantes mystaceus; Phidippus hirsutus

= Phidippus mystaceus =

Species of spider

Phidippus mystaceus is a species of jumping spider that is found in North America. Females grow to about 1 centimetre (0.39 in) in body length.

== Etymology ==
The species name is derived from the Ancient Greek mystax, meaning "moustache", which the females of this species feature. An older synonym of the species is P. asinarius, referring to the markings above the eyes that look similar to donkey ears.

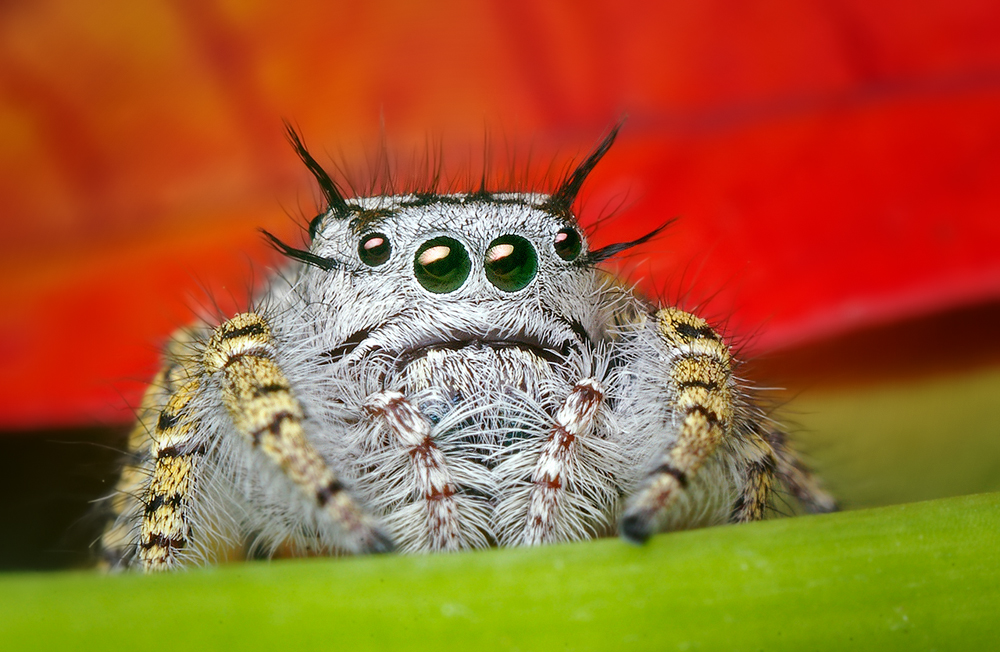
Adult female

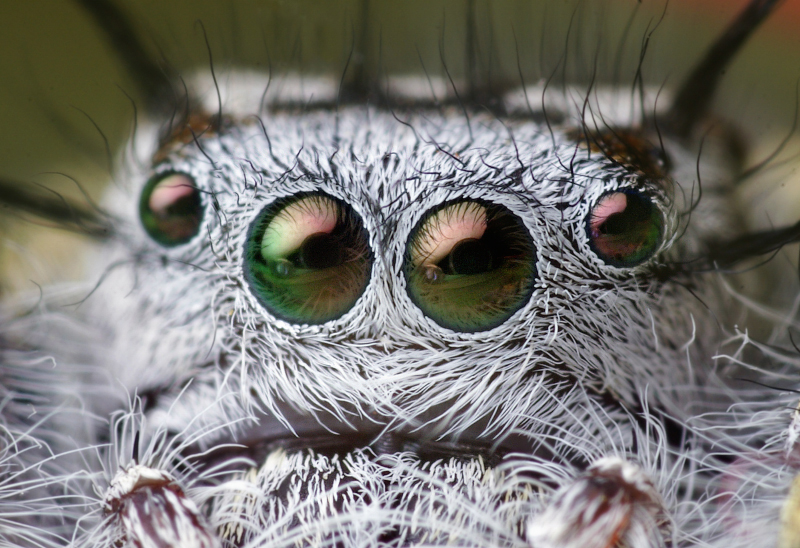
Anterior median eyes of an adult female

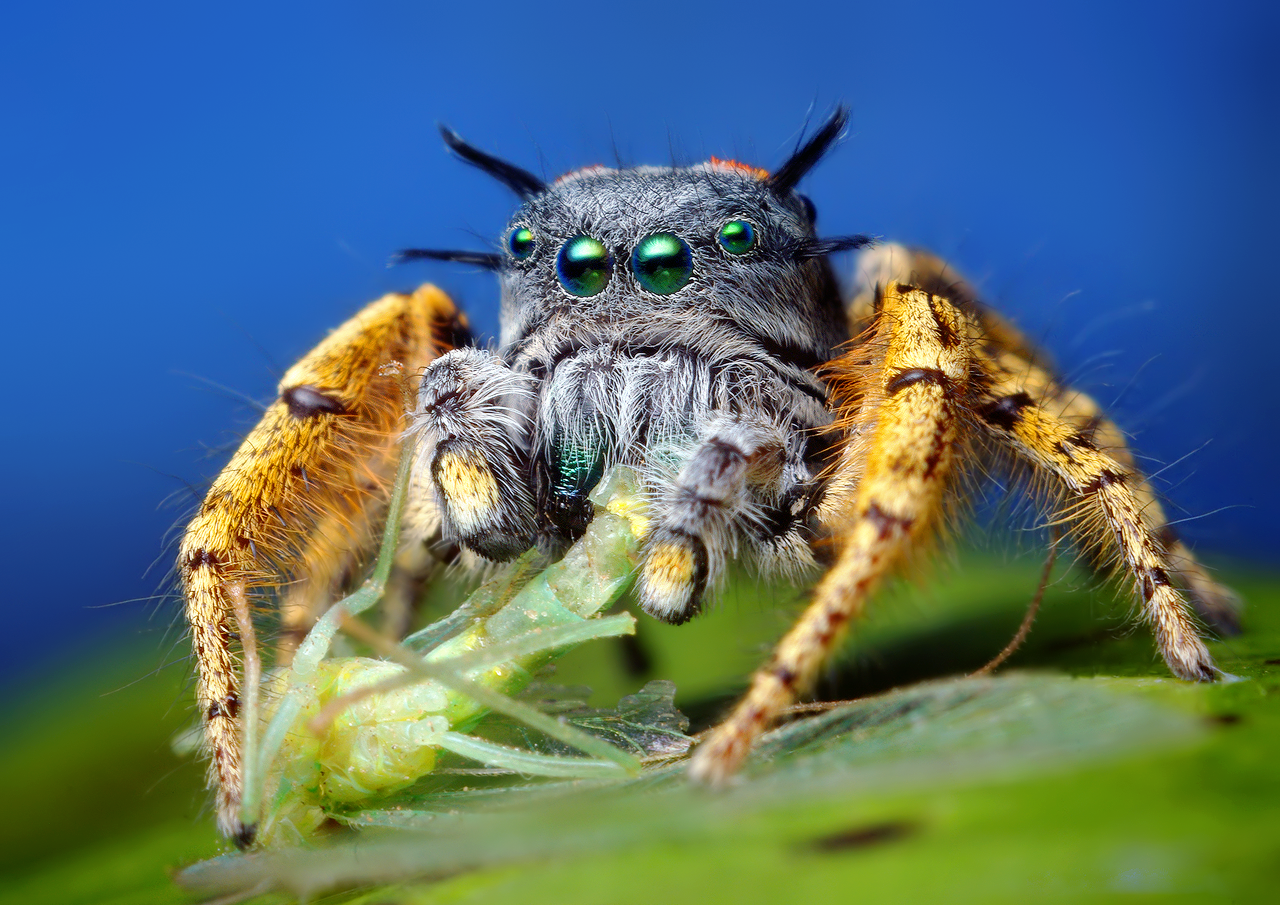
Adult male feeding on a Chrysopid
