= Promachus painteri =

Scientific classification
- Domain: Eukaryota
- Kingdom: Animalia
- Phylum: Arthropoda
- Class: Insecta
- Order: Diptera
- Family: Asilidae
- Genus: Promachus
- Species: P. painteri

Binomial name
- Promachus painteri Bromley, 1934

Species of fly

Promachus painteri is a species of robber flies (insects in the family Asilidae).
