= Promachus quadratus =

Scientific classification
- Domain: Eukaryota
- Kingdom: Animalia
- Phylum: Arthropoda
- Class: Insecta
- Order: Diptera
- Family: Asilidae
- Genus: Promachus
- Species: P. quadratus

Binomial name
- Promachus quadratus (Wiedemann, 1821)

Synonyms
- Asilus quadratus Wiedemann, 1821

Species of fly

Promachus quadratus is a species of robber flies (insects in the family Asilidae).
