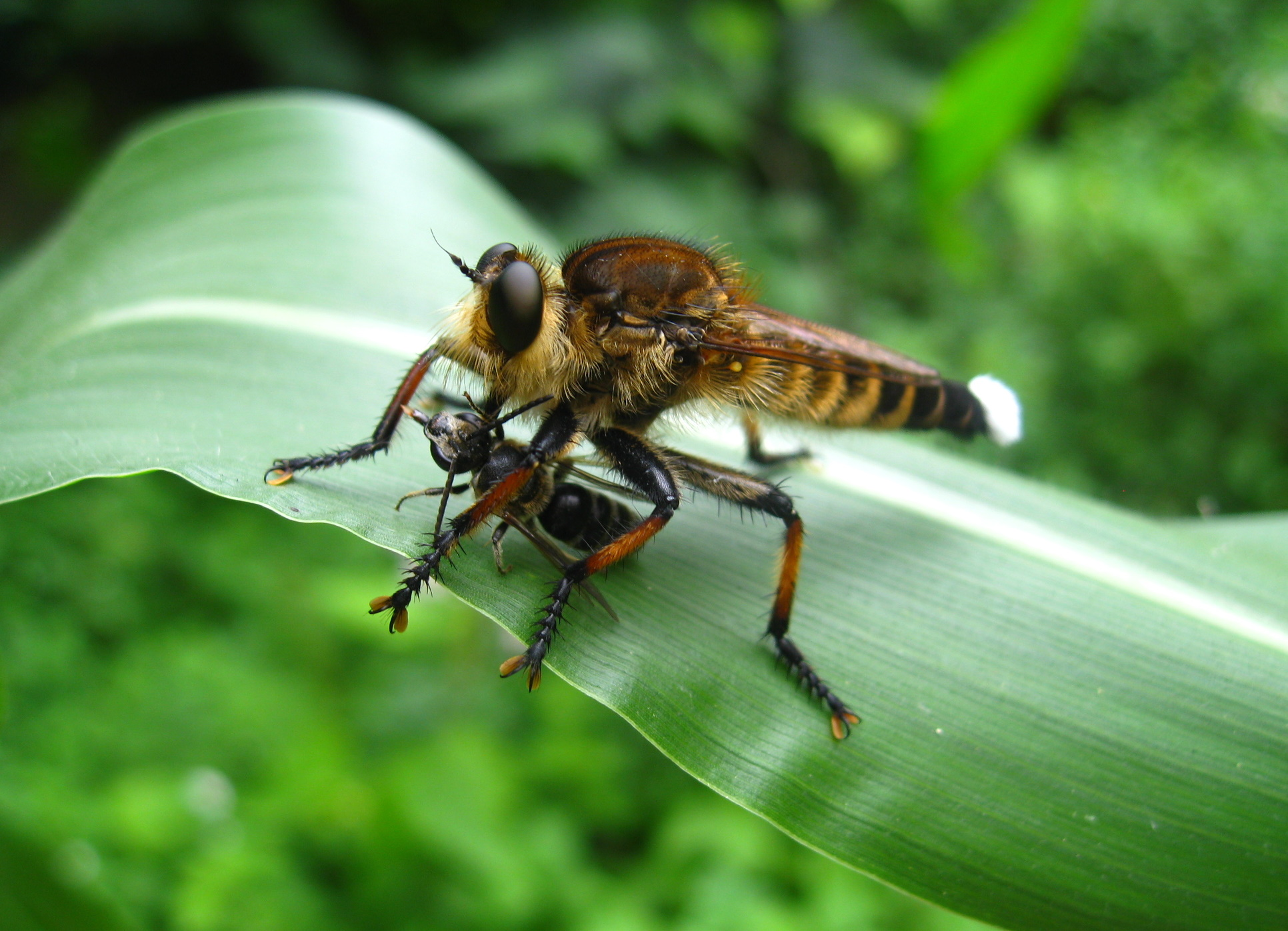

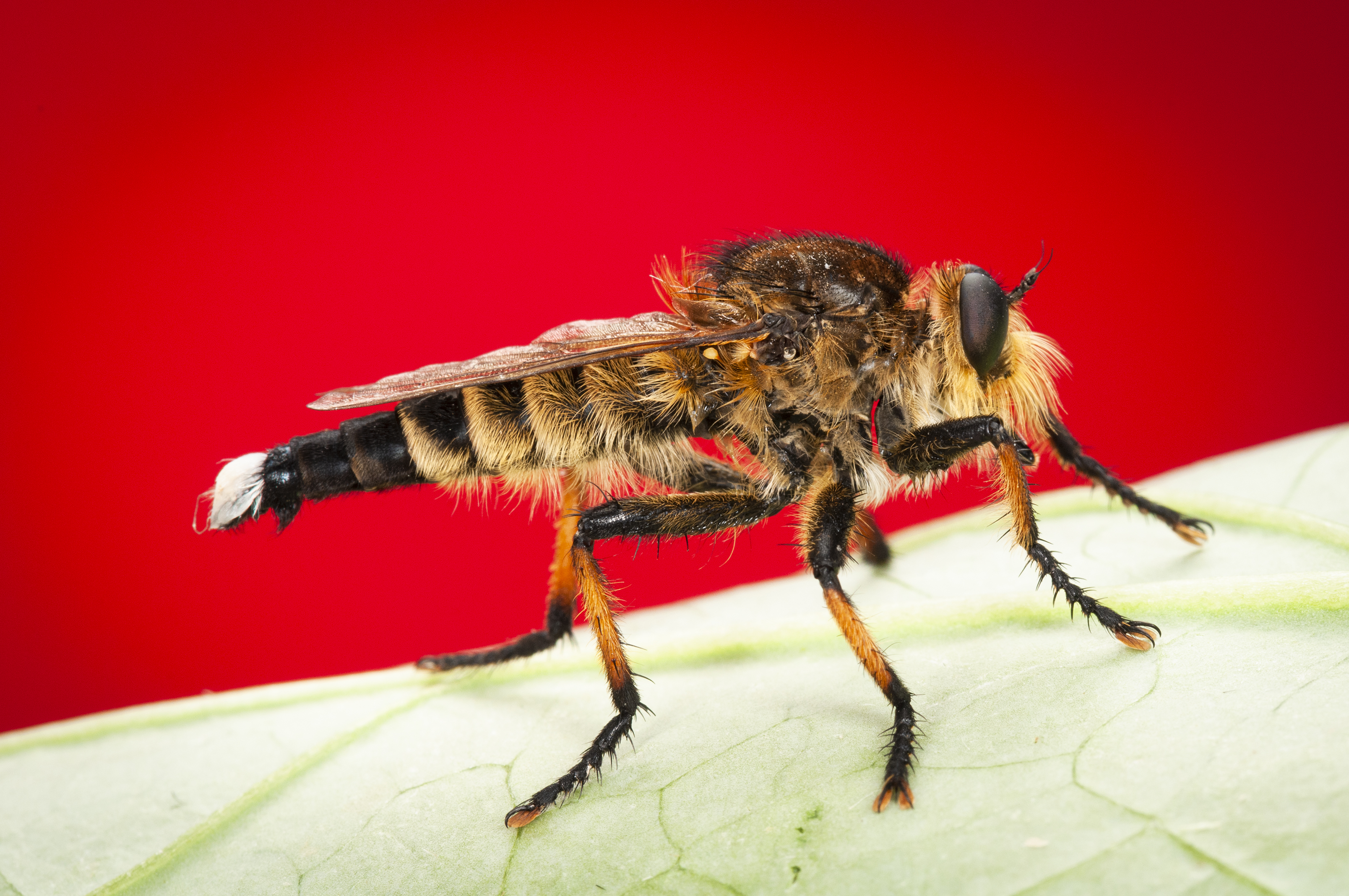
- Promachus yesonicus, Adult, South Korea

Scientific classification
- Kingdom: Animalia
- Phylum: Arthropoda
- Clade: Pancrustacea
- Class: Insecta
- Order: Diptera
- Family: Asilidae
- Genus: Promachus
- Species: P. yesonicus

Binomial name
- Promachus yesonicus (Bigot, 1887)

= Promachus yesonicus =

Species of fly

Promachus yesonicus, or shioya-abu (塩屋虻, シオヤアブ) in Japanese, is a species of robber flies. In Japanese, "shioya" means a salt merchant (someone who makes or deals in salt), and "abu" means a horse-fly. This insect is called "shioya-abu" because the males have a white tip to their tail that resembles salt.

== Distribution ==
Promachus yesonicus is found throughout Japan from Hokkaido to Okinawa. They are visible from June to September.

== Description ==
Male Promachus yesonicus have a white cotton-like bud at the end of their tails, while females do not. Adults can reach 23–30 millimetres (0.9–1.2 in) in length.

Female Promachus yesonicus in Tokyo

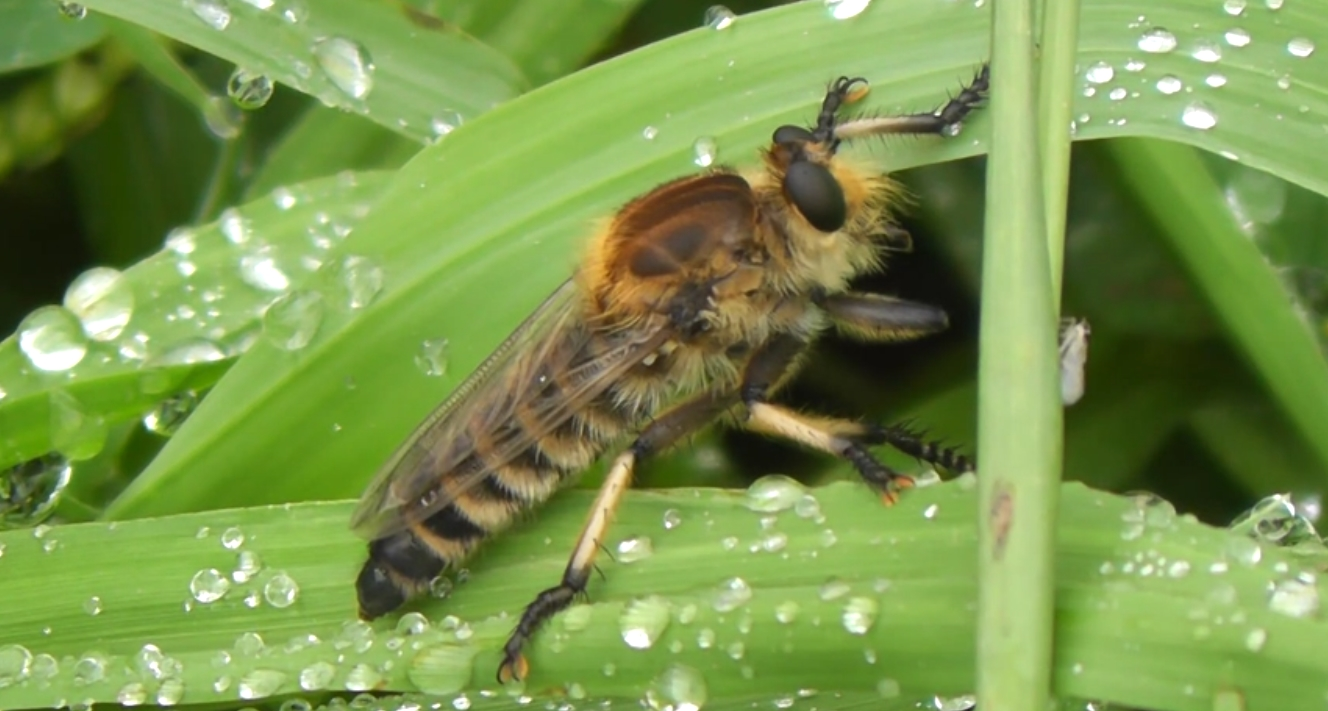
Female in Tokyo, Japan

Male in Tokyo, Japan

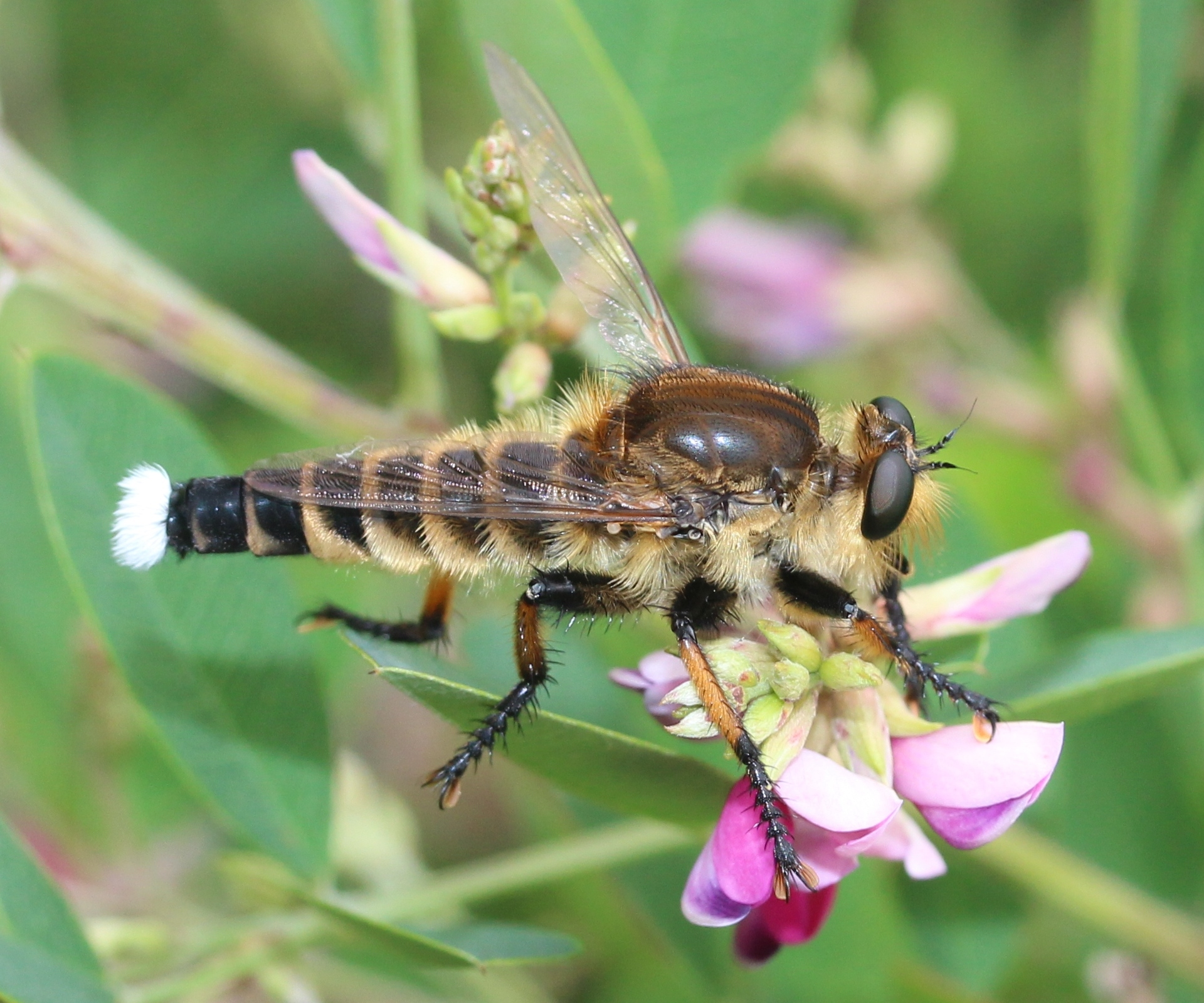
Male in Japan

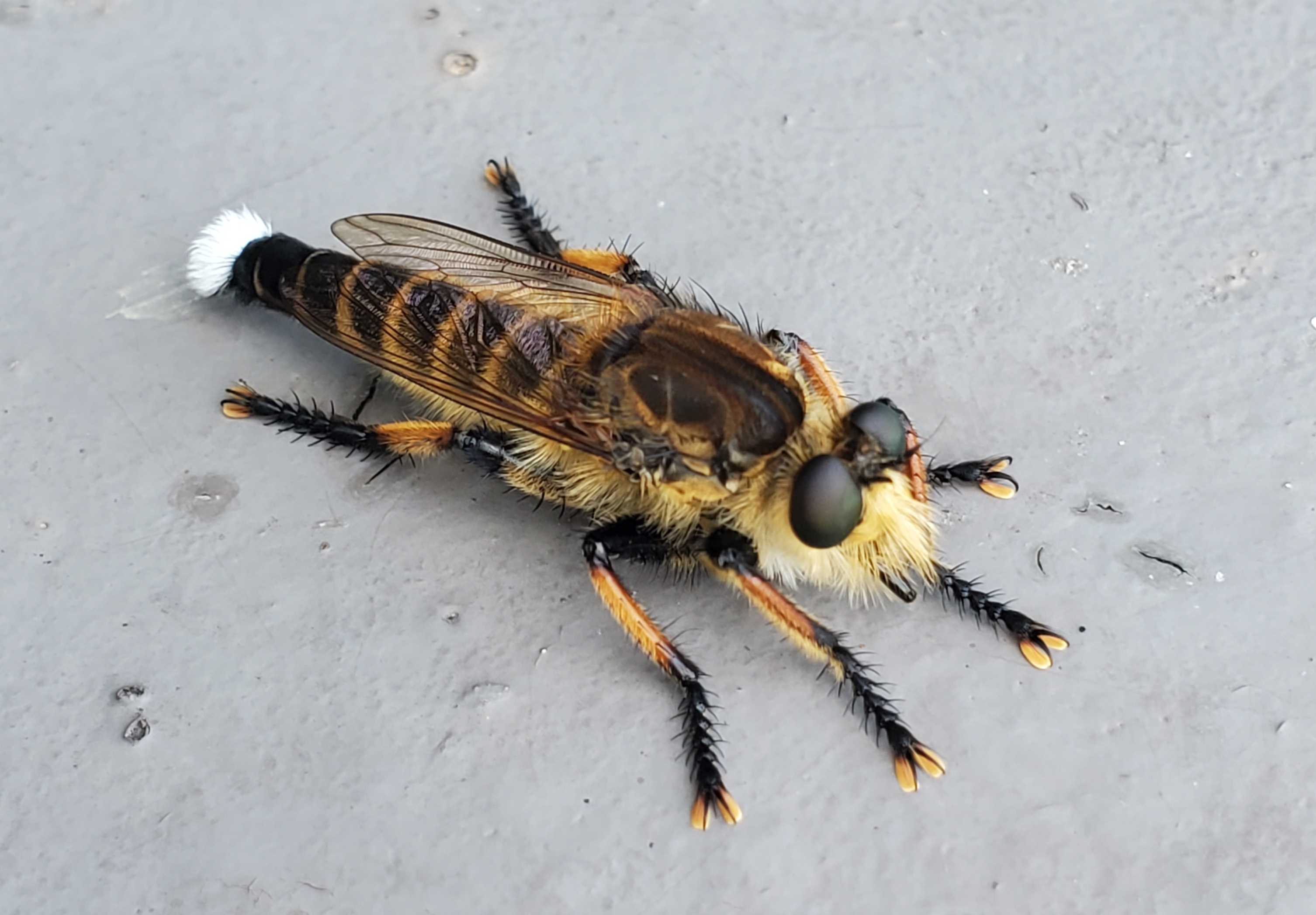
Male in Fukuoka, Japan
