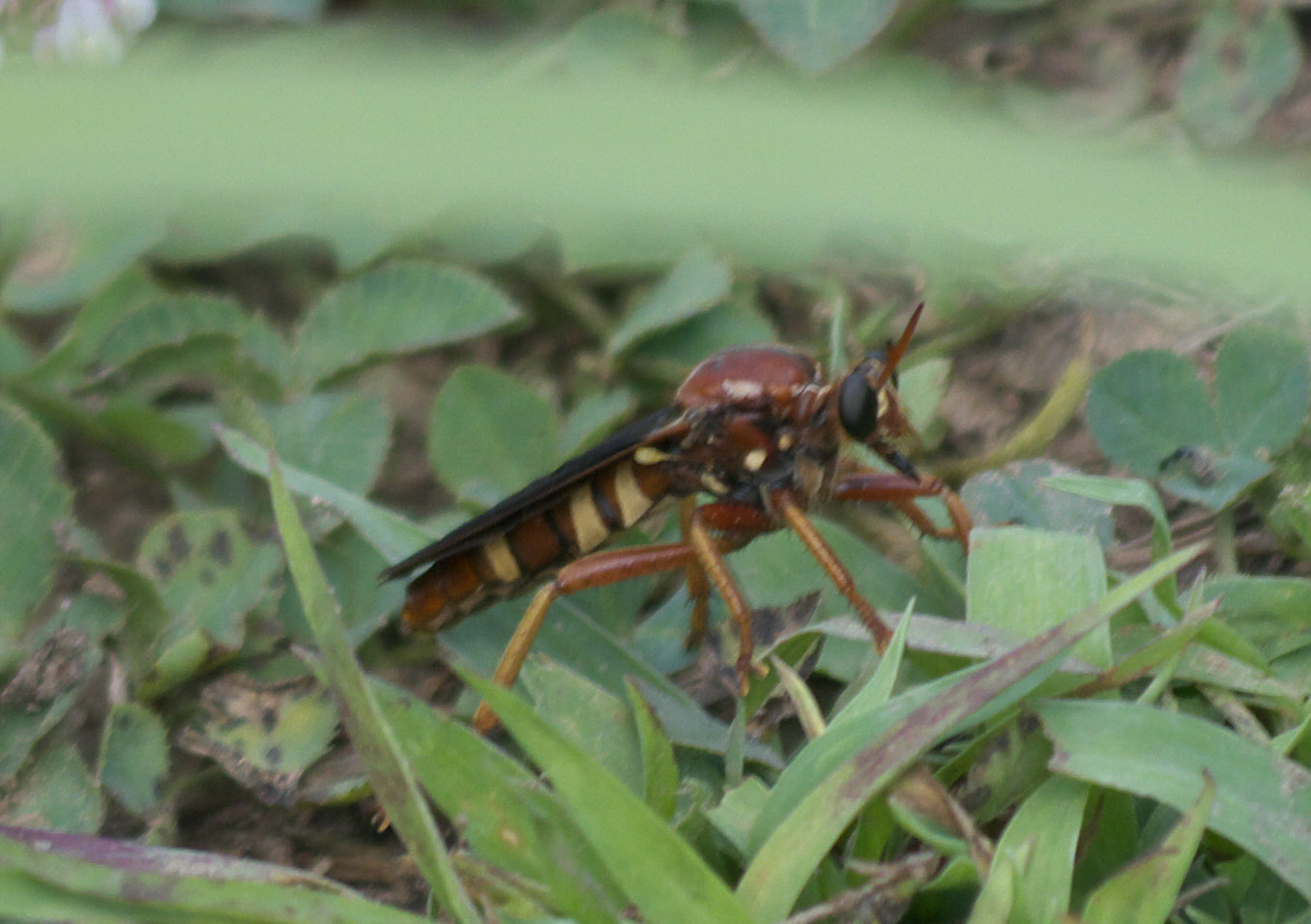

Scientific classification
- Kingdom: Animalia
- Phylum: Arthropoda
- Class: Insecta
- Order: Diptera
- Family: Asilidae
- Genus: Prolepsis
- Species: P. tristis

Binomial name
- Prolepsis tristis (Walker, 1851)

Synonyms
- Dasypogon tristis Walker, 1851; Dizonias bicinctus Loew, 1866; Dizonias pilatei Johnson, 1903; Ospriocerus albifasciatus Back, 1904

= Prolepsis tristis =

Species of fly

Prolepsis tristis is a species of robber flies (insects in the family Asilidae).
