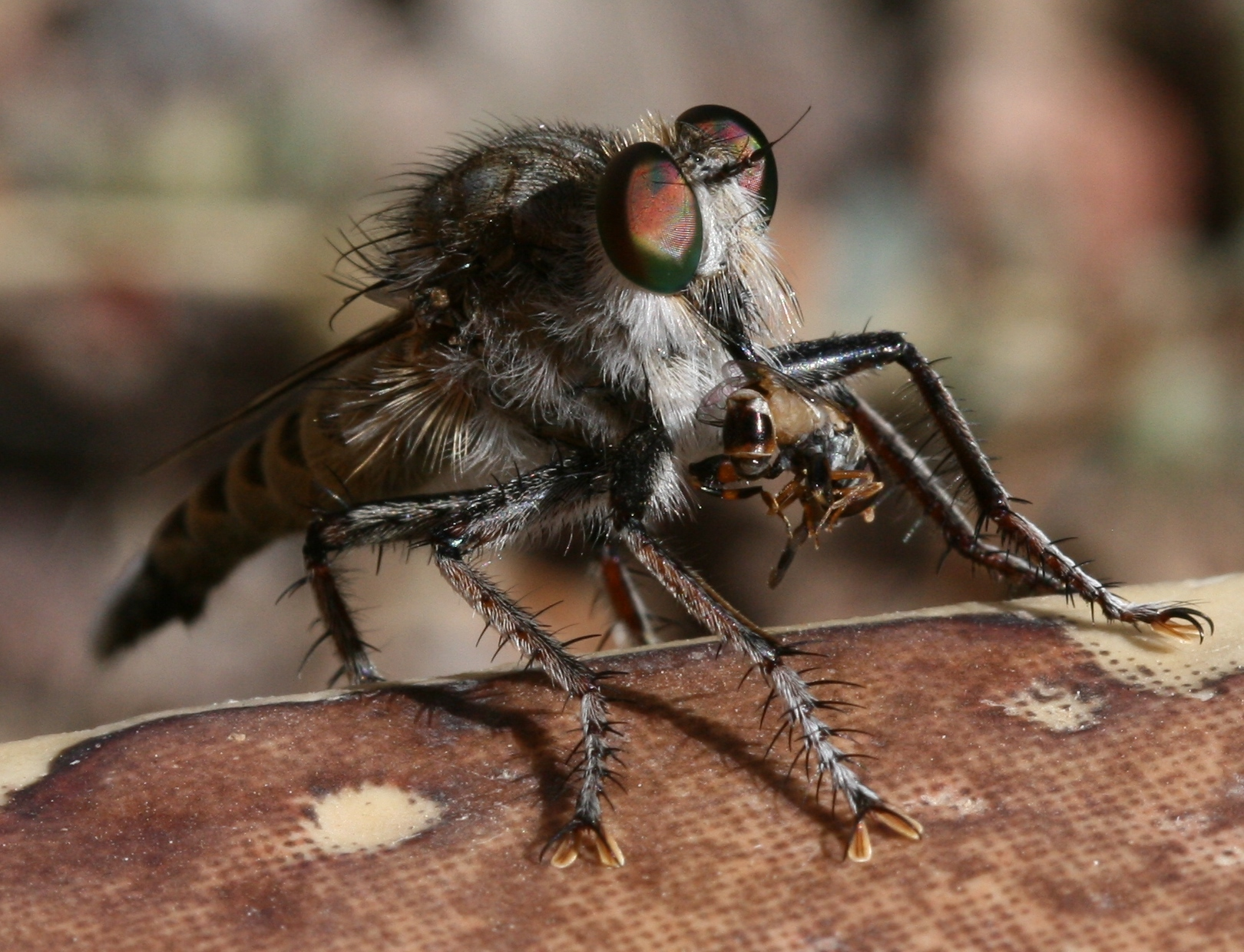

Scientific classification
- Domain: Eukaryota
- Kingdom: Animalia
- Phylum: Arthropoda
- Class: Insecta
- Order: Diptera
- Family: Asilidae
- Genus: Promachus
- Species: P. consanguineus

Binomial name
- Promachus consanguineus (Macquart, 1838)

= Promachus consanguineus =

Species of fly

Promachus consanguineus is a species of robber flies (insects in the family Asilidae). It was first described by French entomologist Pierre-Justin-Marie Macquart in 1838. It is endemic to the eastern Canary Islands (Fuerteventura, Lanzarote, La Graciosa).
