= Proagonistes mystaceus =

Scientific classification
- Domain: Eukaryota
- Kingdom: Animalia
- Phylum: Arthropoda
- Class: Insecta
- Order: Diptera
- Family: Asilidae
- Genus: Proagonistes
- Species: P. mystaceus

Binomial name
- Proagonistes mystaceus Bromley, 1930

Species of fly

Proagonistes mystaceus is a species of fly in the family Asilidae.
