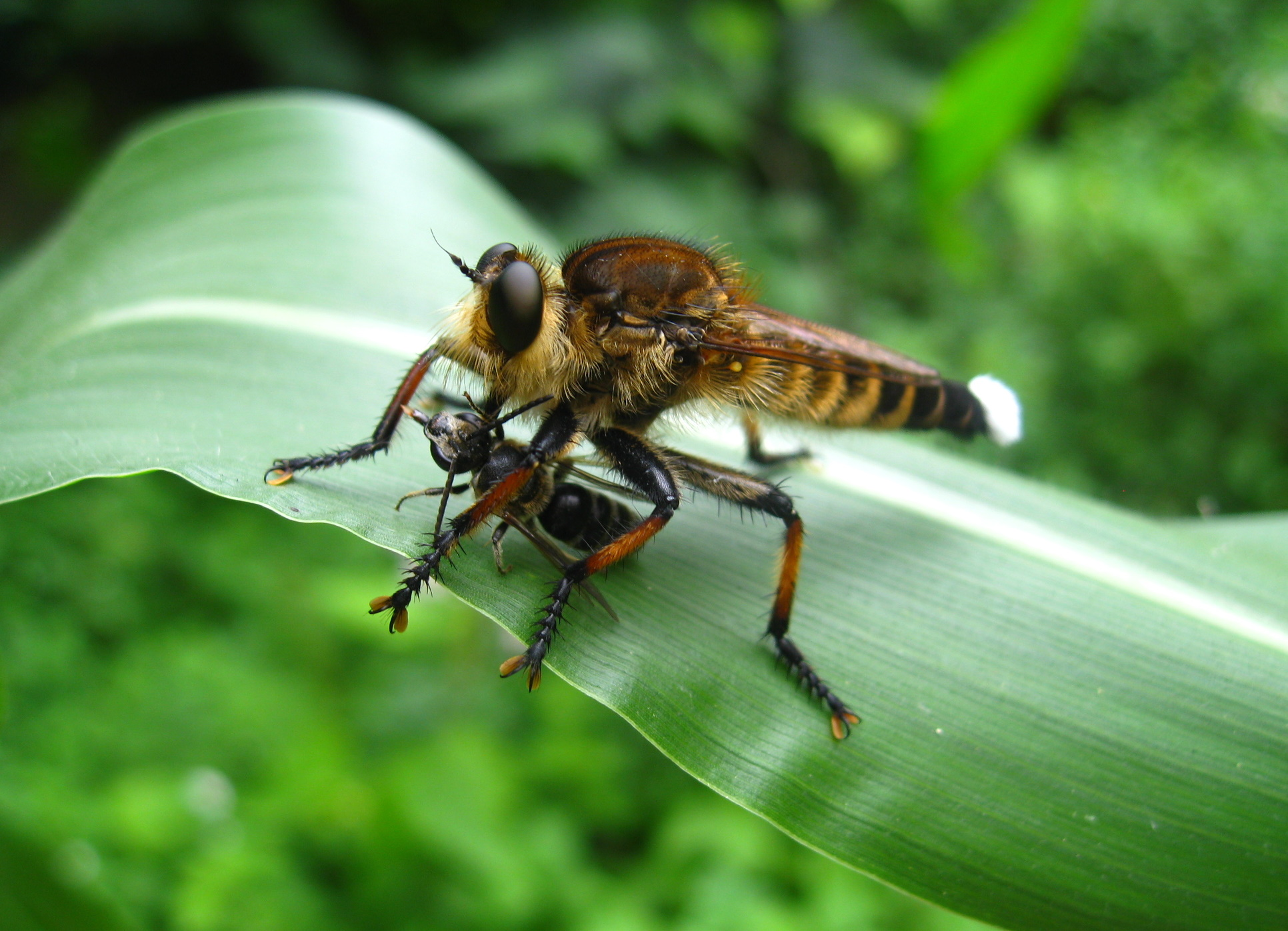
- Promachus yesonicus

Scientific classification
- Kingdom: Animalia
- Phylum: Arthropoda
- Clade: Pancrustacea
- Class: Insecta
- Order: Diptera
- Family: Asilidae
- Subfamily: Asilinae
- Genus: Promachus (Loew, 1848)

= Promachus (fly) =

Genus of flies

Promachus is a genus of robber flies. It is part of the subfamily Asilinae.

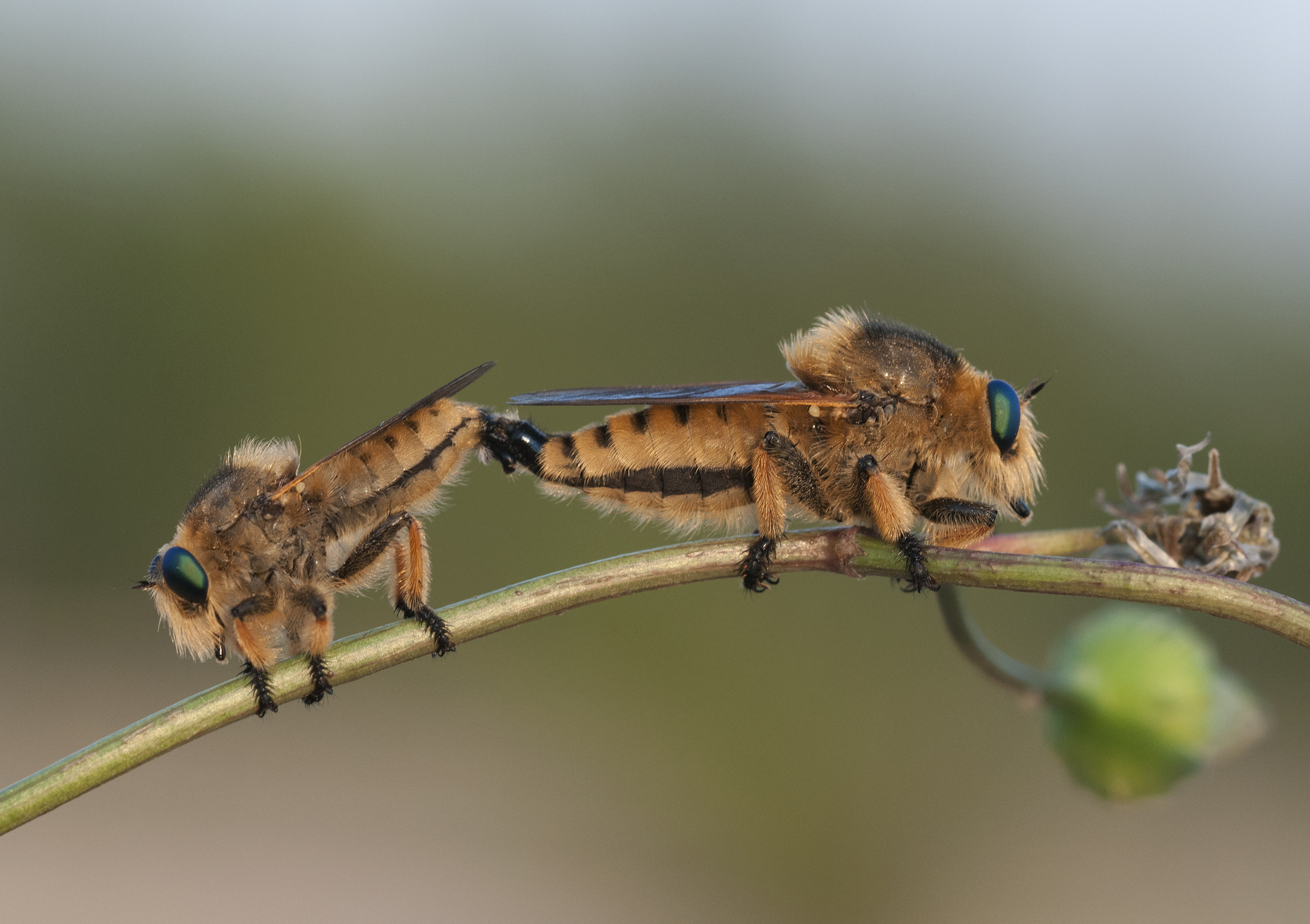
P. rufipes (Red-footed Cannibalflies) mating

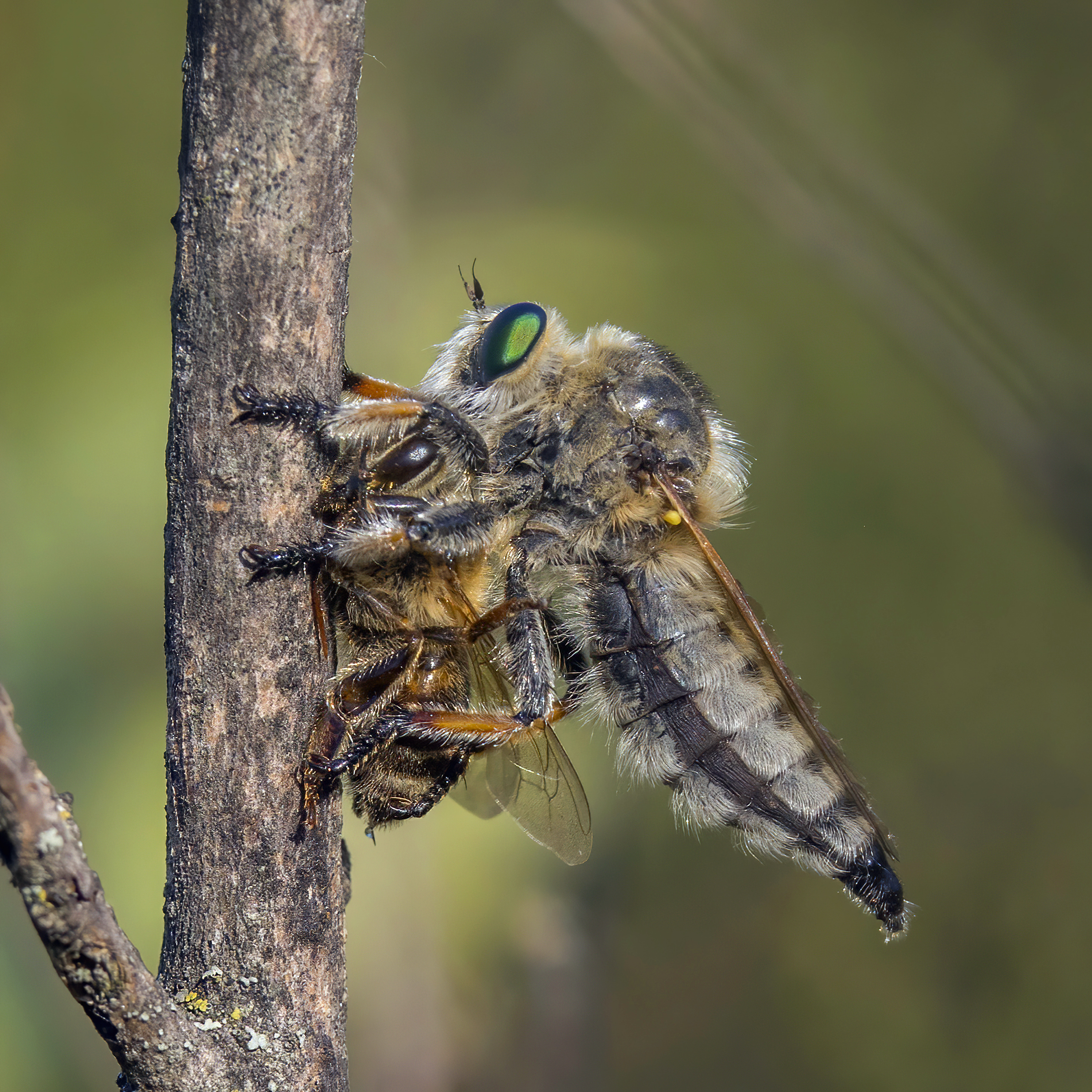
P. sp. with bee prey

== See also ==
- List of Promachus species
