= List of Asilidae species: A =

This article lists described species of the family Asilidae start with letter A.

A • B • C • D • E • F • G • H • I • J • K • L • M • N • O • P • Q • R • S • T • U • V • W • Y • Z

== Ablautus ==
- Ablautus arnaudi Wilcox, 1966
- Ablautus basini Wilcox, 1966
- Ablautus californicus Wilcox, 1935
- Ablautus coachellus Wilcox, 1966
- Ablautus colei Wilcox, 1966
- Ablautus coquilletti Wilcox, 1935
- Ablautus flavipes Coquillett, 1904
- Ablautus linsleyi Wilcox, 1966
- Ablautus mimus (Osten Sacken, 1877)
- Ablautus rubens Coquillett, 1904
- Ablautus rufotibialis Back, 1909
- Ablautus schlingeri Wilcox, 1966
- Ablautus trifarius Loew, 1866
- Ablautus vanduzeei Wilcox, 1935

== Abrophila ==
- Abrophila whitei Daniels, 1987

== Acasilus ==
- Acasilus tigrimontis Londt, 2005

== Acnephalomyia ==
- Acnephalomyia andrenoides (Wiedemann, 1828)

== Acnephalum ==
- Acnephalum cockerelli Curran, 1934
- Acnephalum cylindricum Oldroyd, 1974
- Acnephalum dorsale Macquart, 1838
- Acnephalum futile Wulp, 1899
- Acnephalum gracilis (Hermann, 1908)
- Acnephalum olivieri Macquart, 1838
- Acnephalum platygaster Loew, 1858
- Acnephalum quadratum (Wiedemann, 1828)

== Acrochordomerus ==
- Acrochordomerus aeneus Hermann, 1920
- Acrochordomerus engeli Efflatoun, 1937
- Acrochordomerus mediterraneus Kovár & Hradský, 1995

== Acronyches ==
- Acronyches alexanderi Papavero, 1971
- Acronyches fenestratulus Hermann, 1921
- Acronyches geosarginus Papavero, 1971
- Acronyches imitator Hermann, 1921
- Acronyches maya Martin, 1968
- Acronyches meruuna Papavero, 1971
- Acronyches plutactites Papavero, 1971
- Acronyches rarus Martin, 1968
- Acronyches westcotti Martin, 1968
- Acronyches willistoni Hermann, 1921

== Aczelia ==
- Aczelia argentina (Wulp, 1882)
- Aczelia infumata (Lynch Arribálzaga, 1880)
- Aczelia tsacasi Papavero, 1971

== Adelodus ==
- Adelodus nigrocoeruleus Hermann, 1912
- Adelodus rufipes Hermann, 1912

== Afganopogon ==
- Afganopogon lindbergi Hradský, 1962

== Afroepitriptus ==
- Afroepitriptus beckeri Lehr, 1992

== Afroestricus ==
- Afroestricus abyssinia Scarbrough, 2005
- Afroestricus chiastoneurus (Speiser, 1910)
- Afroestricus eminentis Scarbrough, 2005
- Afroestricus fulaui Scarbrough, 2005
- Afroestricus hamulus Scarbrough, 2005
- Afroestricus insectaris Scarbrough, 2005
- Afroestricus kimerus Scarbrough, 2005
- Afroestricus macroscelis (Bezzi, 1906)
- Afroestricus minutus (Bromley, 1936)
- Afroestricus morani Scarbrough, 2005
- Afroestricus persuasus (Oldroyd, 1960)
- Afroestricus sadaukii Scarbrough, 2005
- Afroestricus sankofa Scarbrough, 2005
- Afroestricus variabilis (Engel, 1929)
- Afroestricus varipes (Curran, 1927)
- Afroestricus velatus Scarbrough, 2005
- Afroestricus verutus Scarbrough, 2005
- Afroestricus victus Scarbrough, 2005
- Afroestricus vittatus (Curran, 1927)
- Afroestricus vorax Scarbrough, 2005

== Afroholopogon ==
- Afroholopogon africanus (Ricardo, 1925)
- Afroholopogon anassa Londt, 2005
- Afroholopogon argos Londt, 2005
- Afroholopogon aspros Londt, 2005
- Afroholopogon capensis (Lindner, 1961)
- Afroholopogon chirundu Londt, 2005
- Afroholopogon dasys Londt, 2005
- Afroholopogon fugax (Loew, 1858)
- Afroholopogon mauros Londt, 2005
- Afroholopogon meilloni (Oldroyd, 1974)
- Afroholopogon melas Londt, 2005
- Afroholopogon pardosoros Londt, 2005
- Afroholopogon peregrinus (Engel, 1929)
- Afroholopogon tanystylos Londt, 2005
- Afroholopogon uranopia Londt, 2005
- Afroholopogon vumba (Oldroyd, 1974)
- Afroholopogon waltlii (Meigen, 1838)
- Afroholopogon xeros Londt, 2005

== Afromelittodes ==
- Afromelittodes mimos Londt, 2003
- Afromelittodes solis (Oldroyd & Bruggen, 1963) Oldroyd

== Afromochtherus ==
- Afromochtherus anatolicus Londt, 2002
- Afromochtherus annulatus (Martin, 1964)
- Afromochtherus astiptus Londt, 2002
- Afromochtherus atrox (Tsacas, 1969)
- Afromochtherus fanovanensis (Bromley, 1942)
- Afromochtherus griseolus (Oldroyd, 1960)
- Afromochtherus kolodrilus Londt, 2002
- Afromochtherus malawi Londt, 2002
- Afromochtherus megastylus Londt, 2002
- Afromochtherus melanurus Londt, 2002
- Afromochtherus mendax (Tsacas, 1969)
- Afromochtherus mkomazi Londt, 2002
- Afromochtherus peri Londt, 2002
- Afromochtherus rufinota (Martin, 1964)
- Afromochtherus sathus Londt, 2002
- Afromochtherus unctus (Oldroyd, 1939)
- Afromochtherus zoropegus Londt, 2002

== Afromosia ==
- Afromosia barkemeyeri Londt, 2015

== Afroscleropogon ==
- Afroscleropogon armatus (Oldroyd, 1974)
- Afroscleropogon braunsi (Oldroyd, 1974)
- Afroscleropogon bullingtoni Londt, 1999
- Afroscleropogon clementsi Londt, 1999
- Afroscleropogon dilutus (Walker, 1851)
- Afroscleropogon lavignei Londt, 1999
- Afroscleropogon nagatomii Londt, 1999

== Agrostomyia ==
- Agrostomyia dimorpha Londt, 1994

== Aireina ==
- Aireina paradoxa Frey, 1934

== Akatiomyia ==
- Akatiomyia eremnos Londt, 2013

== Albibarbefferia ==
- Albibarbefferia albibarbis (Macquart, 1838)
- Albibarbefferia armatus (Hine, 1918)
- Albibarbefferia bicolor (Bellardi, 1861)
- Albibarbefferia bimaculata (Bellardi, 1861)
- Albibarbefferia cingulata (Bellardi, 1861)
- Albibarbefferia duncani Wilcox, 1966
- Albibarbefferia eximia (Bellardi, 1861)
- Albibarbefferia grandis (Hine, 1919)
- Albibarbefferia heteroptera (Macquart, 1846)
- Albibarbefferia incognita (Forbes, 1987)
- Albibarbefferia leucocomus (Williston, 1885)
- Albibarbefferia marginata (Bellardi, 1861)
- Albibarbefferia neosimilis (Forbes, 1987)
- Albibarbefferia peralta (Wilcox, 1966)
- Albibarbefferia quadrimaculata (Bellardi, 1861)
- Albibarbefferia sagax (Williston, 1901)
- Albibarbefferia sonorensis (Forbes, 1987)
- Albibarbefferia tagax (Williston, 1885)
- Albibarbefferia vertebrata (Bromley, 1940)
- Albibarbefferia zonata (Hine, 1919)

== Albicoma ==
- Albicoma kaptshagaica Lehr, 1987

== Alcimus ==
- Alcimus aethiopicus Bigot, 1891
- Alcimus anax Speiser, 1924
- Alcimus angustipennis Loew, 1858
- Alcimus brevipennis Ricardo, 1922
- Alcimus cuthbertsoni Hobby, 1934
- Alcimus limbatus (Macquart, 1838)
- Alcimus longipes (Macquart, 1838)
- Alcimus mimus (Wiedemann, 1828)
- Alcimus nigrescens Ricardo, 1922
- Alcimus nigropalpus Hobby, 1934
- Alcimus porrectus (Walker, 1851)
- Alcimus rubicundus Hobby, 1934
- Alcimus rubiginosus Gerstaecker, 1871
- Alcimus setifemoratus Hobby, 1934
- Alcimus stenurus Loew, 1858
- Alcimus taeniopus (Rondani, 1873)
- Alcimus tigris Karsch, 1888
- Alcimus tristrigatus Loew, 1858
- Albibarbefferia vertebrata (Bromley, 1940)
- Albibarbefferia zonata (Hine, 1919)

== Allopogon ==
- Allopogon anomalus (Carrera, 1947)
- Allopogon argyrocinctus (Schiner, 1867)
- Allopogon basalis Curran, 1935
- Allopogon castigans (Walker, 1851)
- Allopogon equestris (Wiedemann, 1828)
- Allopogon miles (Wiedemann, 1828)
- Allopogon necans (Wiedemann, 1828)
- Allopogon placidus (Wulp, 1882)
- Allopogon tesselatus (Wiedemann, 1828)
- Allopogon vittatus (Wiedemann, 1828)

== Alvarenga ==
- Alvarenga icarius Carrera, 1960
- Alvarenga matilei Papavero, 1971

== Alyssomyia ==
- Alyssomyia brevicornis (Philippi, 1865)
- Alyssomyia bulbosa Artigas, 1970
- Alyssomyia frayleana Artigas & Parra, 2006
- Alyssomyia limariensis Artigas & Parra, 2006
- Alyssomyia misera Artigas, 1973
- Alyssomyia pampina Artigas, 1970
- Alyssomyia quinquemaculata Artigas, 1973

== Amathomyia ==
- Amathomyia antennata (Banks, 1920)
- Amathomyia persiana Hermann, 1912

== Amblyonychus ==
- Amblyonychus flavifasciatus (Macquart, 1838)
- Amblyonychus gracilis (Macquart, 1838)
- Amblyonychus horni (Bromley, 1935)
- Amblyonychus incisuralis (Macquart, 1838)
- Amblyonychus lateralis (Walker, 1860)
- Amblyonychus nigripes (Fabricius, 1787)
- Amblyonychus ovatus (Martin, 1867)
- Amblyonychus pulchellus (Bellardi, 1861)
- Amblyonychus quatuorlineatus (Macquart, 1838)
- Amblyonychus substitula (Walker, 1851)
- Amblyonychus titan (Carrera, 1959)
- Amblyonychus trapezoidalis (Bellardi, 1861)
- Amblyonychus trichonotus (Wiedemann, 1828)
- Amblyonychus wiedemanni (Schiner, 1867)
- Amblyonychus yepezi (Carrera & Machado-Allison, 1963)

== Ammodaimon ==
- Ammodaimon acares Londt, 1985

== Ammophilomima ==
- Ammophilomima aequinoctialis Janssens, 1953
- Ammophilomima areekuli Martin, 1975
- Ammophilomima auripennis Janssens, 1953
- Ammophilomima australis Martin, 1973
- Ammophilomima basilewskyi Janssens, 1953
- Ammophilomima bifida Martin, 1975
- Ammophilomima contermina (Edwards, 1918)
- Ammophilomima eumenoides Janssens, 1953
- Ammophilomima evanescens Janssens, 1953
- Ammophilomima flava Martin, 1975
- Ammophilomima ghesquierei Janssens, 1953
- Ammophilomima imitatrix Enderlein, 1914
- Ammophilomima indiae Martin, 1973
- Ammophilomima inflatus (Osten Sacken, 1881)
- Ammophilomima kenyae Martin, 1973
- Ammophilomima montana Janssens, 1953
- Ammophilomima nubilipennis Frey, 1937
- Ammophilomima occlusa (Meijere, 1914)
- Ammophilomima pimolae Martin, 1975
- Ammophilomima rufescens Frey, 1937
- Ammophilomima siamae Martin, 1973
- Ammophilomima simila Martin, 1973
- Ammophilomima straeleni Janssens, 1953
- Ammophilomima thailandae Martin, 1973
- Ammophilomima triangulata Enderlein, 1914
- Ammophilomima trifida Hsia, 1949
- Ammophilomima truncata Martin, 1973
- Ammophilomima vitiosa (Wulp, 1872)

== Amorimius ==
- Amorimius barrettoi (Carrera, 1949)
- Amorimius bicolor (Engel, 1930)
- Amorimius martinorum (Artigas & Papavero, 1988)
- Amorimius rubripes (Carrera & Papavero, 1962)

== Amphisbetetus ==
- Amphisbetetus affinis Hermann, 1906
- Amphisbetetus dorsatus Becker, 1913
- Amphisbetetus favillaceus (Loew, 1856)
- Amphisbetetus gederati Efflatoun, 1937
- Amphisbetetus norrisi Paramonov, 1966
- Amphisbetetus primus Paramonov, 1966
- Amphisbetetus ruazi Theodor, 1980
- Amphisbetetus sexspinus Tomasovic, 2008
- Amphisbetetus trinotatus Paramonov, 1966
- Amphisbetetus westralicus Paramonov, 1966

== Anacinaces ==
- Anacinaces gigas Enderlein, 1914
- Anacinaces nahaeoensis Tomosovic & Grootaert, 2003
- Anacinaces ochriventris (Becker, 1925)
- Anacinaces rufiventris (Macquart, 1838)

== Anarmostus ==
- Anarmostus iopterus (Wiedemann, 1828)

== Anarolius ==
- Anarolius bicolor Theodor, 1980
- Anarolius fronto Loew, 1873
- Anarolius jamshidi Abbassian-Lintzen, 1964
- Anarolius jubatus Loew, 1844
- Anarolius rufescens Theodor, 1980
- Anarolius setitarsis Richter, 1963

== Anasillomos ==
- Anasillomos chrysopos Londt, 1983

== Ancylorhynchus ==
- Ancylorhynchus argyrogaster (Séguy, 1932)
- Ancylorhynchus bicolor (Becker, 1913)
- Ancylorhynchus braunsi Bromley, 1936
- Ancylorhynchus brussensis (Schiner, 1867)
- Ancylorhynchus cambodgiensis Tomasovic, 2006
- Ancylorhynchus cingulatus (Rondani, 1846)
- Ancylorhynchus cruciger (Loew, 1858)
- Ancylorhynchus crux Bezzi, 1908
- Ancylorhynchus elbaiensis (Efflatoun, 1937)
- Ancylorhynchus elbaiensis Efflatoun, 1937
- Ancylorhynchus farinosus (Becker, 1913)
- Ancylorhynchus fulvicollis (Bigot, 1879)
- Ancylorhynchus funebris Bromley, 1936
- Ancylorhynchus glaucius (Rossi, 1790)
- Ancylorhynchus glaucius tristis (Séguy, 1932)
- Ancylorhynchus gummigutta (Becker, 1906)
- Ancylorhynchus humeralis (Wiedemann, 1821)
- Ancylorhynchus hylaeiformis Speiser, 1910
- Ancylorhynchus insignis Bromley, 1936
- Ancylorhynchus limbatus (Fabricius, 1794)
- Ancylorhynchus longicornis (Schiner, 1867)
- Ancylorhynchus maculatus (Bigot, 1879)
- Ancylorhynchus magnificus Bromley, 1936
- Ancylorhynchus minus Shi, 1995
- Ancylorhynchus munroi Bromley, 1936
- Ancylorhynchus nomadus (Wiedemann, 1828)
- Ancylorhynchus nyukinus Speiser, 1910
- Ancylorhynchus oldroydi Lindner, 1961
- Ancylorhynchus orientalis Shi, 1995
- Ancylorhynchus percheronii (Macquart, 1834)
- Ancylorhynchus plecioides Meijere, 1913
- Ancylorhynchus pretoriensis Bromley, 1936
- Ancylorhynchus prunus Oldroyd, 1974
- Ancylorhynchus quadrimaculatus (Loew, 1858)
- Ancylorhynchus reynaudii (Macquart, 1838)
- Ancylorhynchus rufipes Meijere, 1913
- Ancylorhynchus rufithorax (Doleschall, 1858)
- Ancylorhynchus rufocinctus (Séguy, 1930)
- Ancylorhynchus senes (Dufour, 1833)
- Ancylorhynchus striatus Oldroyd, 1970
- Ancylorhynchus susurrus (Karsch, 1879)
- Ancylorhynchus tricolor (Loew, 1863)
- Ancylorhynchus unifasciatus (Loew, 1858)
- Ancylorhynchus variegatus (Bigot, 1879)
- Ancylorhynchus vultur (Séguy, 1930)
- Ancylorhynchus zonalis Bromley, 1936

== Andrenosoma ==
- Andrenosoma albibarbe (Meigen, 1820)
- Andrenosoma albopilosum Villeneuve, 1911
- Andrenosoma appendiculatum (Macquart, 1846)
- Andrenosoma atrum (Linnaeus, 1758, 1758)
- Andrenosoma avicenniae Farr, 1965
- Andrenosoma batesi Bromley, 1931
- Andrenosoma bayardi Séguy, 1952
- Andrenosoma boranicum Corti, 1895
- Andrenosoma camposi Curran, 1931
- Andrenosoma chalybeum Williston, 1885
- Andrenosoma choprai Bromley, 1935
- Andrenosoma cinctum (Bellardi, 1861)
- Andrenosoma cinereum (Bellardi, 1861)
- Andrenosoma complexum Oldroyd, 1970
- Andrenosoma corallium Martin, 1966
- Andrenosoma cornutum Oldroyd, 1972
- Andrenosoma cruentum (McAtee, 1919)
- Andrenosoma currani Bromley, 1931
- Andrenosoma cyrtophorum (Hermann, 1912)
- Andrenosoma cyrtoxys Séguy, 1952
- Andrenosoma dayi (Paramonov, 1958)
- Andrenosoma erax Bromley, 1934
- Andrenosoma erythrogaster (Wiedemann, 1828)
- Andrenosoma erythropyga (Wiedemann, 1828)
- Andrenosoma flamipenne Bromley, 1931
- Andrenosoma formidolosum (Walker, 1860)
- Andrenosoma fulvicaudum (Say, 1823)
- Andrenosoma heros Bromley, 1931
- Andrenosoma hesperium Martin, 1966
- Andrenosoma igneum Bromley, 1929
- Andrenosoma irigense Oldroyd, 1972
- Andrenosoma jenisi Kovár & Hradský, 1996
- Andrenosoma leucogenys Séguy, 1952
- Andrenosoma lewisi Farr, 1965
- Andrenosoma mesoxantha (Wiedemann, 1828)
- Andrenosoma modestum (Paramonov, 1958)
- Andrenosoma nigrum Bromley, 1931
- Andrenosoma olbum (Walker, 1849)
- Andrenosoma otanegawanum (Matsumura, 1916)
- Andrenosoma phoenicogaster (Hermann, 1912)
- Andrenosoma purpurascens (Walker, 1856)
- Andrenosoma pusillum Hermann, 1906
- Andrenosoma pygophora Schiner, 1868
- Andrenosoma pyrrhacra (Wiedemann, 1828)
- Andrenosoma pyrrhopyga (Wiedemann, 1828)
- Andrenosoma quadrimaculatum Bromley, 1929
- Andrenosoma queenslandi (Ricardo, 1918)
- Andrenosoma rubidapex (Hermann, 1912)
- Andrenosoma rubidum (Williston, 1901)
- Andrenosoma ruficaudum (Williston, 1885)
- Andrenosoma rufipenne (Wiedemann, 1828)
- Andrenosoma rufiventre (Blanchard, 1852)
- Andrenosoma sarcophagum (Hermann, 1912)
- Andrenosoma serpentinum (Bezzi, 1908)
- Andrenosoma serratum Hermann, 1906
- Andrenosoma sexpunctatum (Williston, 1901)
- Andrenosoma sicarium (McAtee, 1919)
- Andrenosoma subheros Bromley, 1931
- Andrenosoma tectamum (Walker, 1849)
- Andrenosoma trigoniferum Hermann, 1906
- Andrenosoma valentinae Richter, 1985
- Andrenosoma varipes (Banks, 1920)
- Andrenosoma violaceum (Fabricius, 1781)
- Andrenosoma xanthocnemum (Wiedemann, 1828)

== Aneomochtherus ==
- Aneomochtherus acratus (Tsacas, 1968)
- Aneomochtherus aegaeus (Tsacas, 1965)
- Aneomochtherus aegyptius (Macquart, 1838)
- Aneomochtherus aerifacies (Tsacas, 1968)
- Aneomochtherus africanus (Ricardo, 1919)
- Aneomochtherus alexisi Tomasovic, 2004
- Aneomochtherus arabicus (Macquart, 1838)
- Aneomochtherus atripes (Oldroyd, 1958)
- Aneomochtherus baratovi Lehr, 1996
- Aneomochtherus brevipennis (Séguy, 1932)
- Aneomochtherus confusus (Tsacas, 1965)
- Aneomochtherus cythereius (Tsacas, 1965)
- Aneomochtherus darvasicus Lehr, 1996
- Aneomochtherus deserticolus (Karsch, 1888)
- Aneomochtherus desertorum (Lehr, 1958)
- Aneomochtherus difficilis Lehr, 1996
- Aneomochtherus farinosus (Loew, 1871)
- Aneomochtherus flavicornis (Ruthe, 1831)
- Aneomochtherus flavipes (Meigen, 1820)
- Aneomochtherus granitis (Tsacas, 1963)
- Aneomochtherus grisescens (Tsacas, 1968)
- Aneomochtherus hauseri (Engel, 1927)
- Aneomochtherus hermonensis (Theodor, 1980)
- Aneomochtherus hungaricus (Engel, 1927)
- Aneomochtherus hybopygus (Tsacas, 1968)
- Aneomochtherus illustris (Schiner, 1867)
- Aneomochtherus kompancevae Lehr, 1996
- Aneomochtherus lepidus (Loew, 1871)
- Aneomochtherus leucophorus (Tsacas, 1963)
- Aneomochtherus libanonensis (Tsacas, 1968)
- Aneomochtherus macropygus (Tsacas, 1968)
- Aneomochtherus marikovskii (Lehr, 1958)
- Aneomochtherus mesopotamicus (Janssens, 1961)
- Aneomochtherus micrasiaticus (Tsacas, 1968)
- Aneomochtherus monobia (Speiser, 1910)
- Aneomochtherus mundus (Loew, 1849)
- Aneomochtherus nairicus (Richter, 1962)
- Aneomochtherus ochriventris (Loew, 1854)
- Aneomochtherus oschii Lehr, 1996
- Aneomochtherus perplexus (Becker, 1923)
- Aneomochtherus petrishtshevae (Stackelberg, 1937)
- Aneomochtherus platypygus (Tsacas, 1968)
- Aneomochtherus psathyrus (Tsacas, 1968)
- Aneomochtherus pygaeus (Tsacas, 1963)
- Aneomochtherus quettanus (Tsacas, 1963)
- Aneomochtherus rhogmopygus (Tsacas, 1965)
- Aneomochtherus rubipygus (Lehr, 1972)
- Aneomochtherus sahariensis (Tsacas, 1968)
- Aneomochtherus sinensis (Ricardo, 1919)
- Aneomochtherus soleus (Tsacas, 1968)
- Aneomochtherus stackelbergi (Lehr, 1958)
- Aneomochtherus tenuis (Tsacas, 1968)
- Aneomochtherus tricuspidatus (Engel, 1927)

== Anisopogon ==
- Anisopogon asiaticus Oldroyd, 1963
- Anisopogon glabellus von Roeder, 1881
- Anisopogon gracillimus Lehr, 1970
- Anisopogon hermanni (Engel, 1930)
- Anisopogon parvus Efflatoun, 1937
- Anisopogon pulcher Efflatoun, 1937

== Annamyia ==
- Annamyia maren Pritchard, 1941

== Anoplothyrea ==
- Anoplothyrea indiana Joseph & Parui, 1987
- Anoplothyrea javana (Meijere, 1911)

== Antipalus ==
- Antipalus bilobus Ionescu & Weinberg, 1960
- Antipalus graecus Moucha & Hradský, 1966
- Antipalus krueperi Loew, 1871
- Antipalus reginae Moucha & Hradský, 1966
- Antipalus similis Moucha & Hradský, 1966
- Antipalus sinuatus (Loew, 1854)
- Antipalus truncatus (Loew, 1849)
- Antipalus varipes (Meigen, 1820)
- Antipalus weinbergae Moucha & Hradský, 1966
- Antipalus wieneckii Wulp, 1872

== Antiphrisson ==
- Antiphrisson accessus Lehr, 1986
- Antiphrisson adpressus (Loew, 1849)
- Antiphrisson adpressus candidus Villeneuve, 1924
- Antiphrisson alaschanicus Lehr, 1986
- Antiphrisson alpicola Lehr, 1986
- Antiphrisson aspereum Lehr, 1986
- Antiphrisson breviaristatus Lehr, 1972
- Antiphrisson charanchoicus Lehr, 1987
- Antiphrisson erenitus Lehr, 1986
- Antiphrisson fossilis Lehr, 1986
- Antiphrisson fuligineus Loew, 1871
- Antiphrisson grunini Lehr, 1970
- Antiphrisson koo Lehr, 1986
- Antiphrisson malkovskii Lehr, 1970
- Antiphrisson mica Lehr, 1986
- Antiphrisson minor Lehr, 1970
- Antiphrisson minor aex Lehr, 1986
- Antiphrisson mitjaevi Lehr, 1964
- Antiphrisson mongolicus Lehr, 1970
- Antiphrisson mongolicus eriopyx Lehr, 1972
- Antiphrisson monstrosus Lehr, 1986
- Antiphrisson mujuncumus Lehr, 1986
- Antiphrisson niger Lehr, 1970
- Antiphrisson pecinensis Lehr, 1986
- Antiphrisson schurovenkovi Lehr, 1970
- Antiphrisson semivillosus Lehr, 1986
- Antiphrisson solex (Enderlein, 1934)
- Antiphrisson tenebrosus Lehr, 1972
- Antiphrisson trifarius (Loew, 1849)
- Antiphrisson zaitzevi Lehr, 1972

== Antiscylaticus ==
- Antiscylaticus snowi Londt, 2010

== Anypodetus ==
- Anypodetus arachnoides Oldroyd, 1974
- Anypodetus fasciatus Hermann, 1908
- Anypodetus fascipennis Engel, 1924
- Anypodetus leucothrix Londt, 2000
- Anypodetus macroceros Londt, 2000
- Anypodetus nigrifacies Ricardo, 1925
- Anypodetus phalaros Londt, 2000
- Anypodetus unicolor Oldroyd, 1974

== Apachekolos ==
- Apachekolos clavipes (Johnson, 1897)
- Apachekolos confusio Martin, 1957
- Apachekolos crinita Martin, 1957
- Apachekolos flaventis Scarbrough & Perez-Gelabert, 2005
- Apachekolos invasa Scarbrough & Perez-Gelabert, 2005
- Apachekolos magna Scarbrough & Perez-Gelabert, 2005
- Apachekolos scapularis (Bigot, 1878)
- Apachekolos tenuipes (Loew, 1862)
- Apachekolos volubilis Scarbrough & Perez-Gelabert, 2005
- Apachekolos vultus Scarbrough & Perez-Gelabert, 2005
- Apachekolos weslacensis (Bromley, 1951)

== Aphamartania ==
- Aphamartania breviventris (Macquart, 1848)
- Aphamartania digna Pritchard, 1941
- Aphamartania flavipennis (Macquart, 1846)
- Aphamartania frauenfeldi Schiner, 1866
- Aphamartania knutsoni Papavero, 1971
- Aphamartania maculipennis (Macquart, 1838)
- Aphamartania marga Pritchard, 1941

== Aphestia ==
- Aphestia annulipes (Macquart, 1838)
- Aphestia chalybaea von Roeder, 1881
- Aphestia nigra Bigot, 1878

== Aphistina ==
- Aphistina balabacensis Oldroyd, 1972
- Aphistina partita (Walker, 1857)

== Aphractia ==
- Aphractia longicornis (Hermann, 1912)
- Aphractia rubida (Hermann, 1912)
- Aphractia vivax (Hermann, 1912)

== Aplestobroma ==
- Aplestobroma avidum Hull, 1958

== Apoclea ==
- Apoclea albipila Becker, 1913
- Apoclea algira (Linné, 1767)
- Apoclea approximata Becker, 1907
- Apoclea autumnalis Becker, 1909
- Apoclea conicera Loew, 1856
- Apoclea continuata Becker, 1909
- Apoclea duplicata (Becker, 1925)
- Apoclea femoralis (Wiedemann, 1828)
- Apoclea helvipes Loew, 1873
- Apoclea heteroclita Wulp, 1899
- Apoclea inarticulata Theodor, 1980
- Apoclea indica Bromley, 1935
- Apoclea micracantha Loew, 1856
- Apoclea obscura Theodor, 1980
- Apoclea pakistanicus Rahim, 1976
- Apoclea parvula Theodor, 1980
- Apoclea plurisetosa Becker, 1909
- Apoclea rajasthanensis Joseph & Parui, 1984
- Apoclea treibensis Theodor, 1980
- Apoclea trivialis Loew, 1873

== Apolastauroides ==
- Apolastauroides kamakusa Artigas & Papavero, 1988

== Apothechyla ==
- Apothechyla carbo (Walker, 1851)
- Apothechyla claripennis (Ricardo, 1912)
- Apothechyla nigrina (Ricardo, 1918)

== Apotinocerus ==
- Apotinocerus brevistylatus (Wulp, 1882)

== Apoxyria ==
- Apoxyria americana Carrera, 1955
- Apoxyria apicata Schiner, 1866

== Araiopogon ==
- Araiopogon carbonarius (Philippi, 1865)
- Araiopogon choapensis Artigas, 1970
- Araiopogon fraternus (Bigot, 1878)
- Araiopogon gayi (Macquart, 1838)
- Araiopogon melisoma Carrera & Papavero, 1962
- Araiopogon perniger (Schiner, 1868)

== Araucopogon ==
- Araucopogon cyanogaster (Loew, 1851)

== Araujoa ==
- Araujoa pernambucana Artigas & Papavero, 1991

== Archilaphria ==
- Archilaphria ava Enderlein, 1914
- Archilaphria jianfenglingensis Jiang, 1992

== Archilestris ==
- Archilestris capnoptera (Wiedemann, 1828)
- Archilestris excellens Enderlein, 1914
- Archilestris geijskesi Papavero & Bernardi, 1974
- Archilestris magnificus (Walker, 1854)
- Archilestris wenzeli Papavero & Bernardi, 1974

== Archilestroides ==
- Archilestroides guimaraesi Artigas & Papavero, 1991

== Argillemisca ==
- Argillemisca pilosa (Lehr, 1964)
- Argillemisca transcaspica (Lehr, 1964)

== Argyrochira ==
- Argyrochira bactriana Richter, 1968

== Argyropogon ==
- Argyropogon argentinus Artigas & Papavero, 1990

== Aridefferia ==
- Aridefferia apache (Wilcox, 1966)
- Aridefferia arida (Williston, 1893)
- Aridefferia basingeri (Wilcox, 1966)
- Aridefferia coulei (Wilcox, 1966)
- Aridefferia cuervana (Hardy, 1943)
- Aridefferia harveyi (Hine, 1919)
- Aridefferia pinali (Wilcox, 1966)
- Aridefferia prattii (Hine, 1919)
- Aridefferia snowi (Hine, 1919)
- Aridefferia subarida (Bromley, 1940)
- Aridefferia subpilosa (Schaeffer, 1916)
- Aridefferia tolandi (Wilcox, 1966)

== Aristofolia ==
- Aristofolia lapila Ayala, 1978

== Artigasus ==
- Artigasus concepcionensis (Bromley, 1932)
- Artigasus schlingeri (Artigas, 1982)
- Artigasus veredus (Artigas, 1970)

== Asicya ==
- Asicya fasciata Lynch Arribálzaga, 1880

== Asilella ==
- Asilella karafutonis (Matsumura, 1911)
- Asilella londti Lehr, 1989
- Asilella sonorus (Lehr, 1967)

== Asiloephesus ==
- Asiloephesus excisus (Loew, 1848)

== Asilopsis ==
- Asilopsis fuscula Cockerell, 1920

== Asilus ==
- Asilus aethiops Pallas, 1771
- Asilus albipilosus Macquart, 1846
- Asilus albitarsatus Macquart, 1834
- Asilus amelanchieris Cockerell, 1911
- Asilus angustialis Zhang, 1989
- Asilus antiphus Walker, 1849
- Asilus antiquus Heer, 1849
- Asilus appendiculatus Macquart, 1848
- Asilus aquaticus (Scopoli, 1763)
- Asilus astutus Williston, 1893
- Asilus auripilus Meigen, 1830
- Asilus baikalensis Becker, 1926
- Asilus barbarus Linnaeus, 1758
- Asilus bicinctus Müller, 1776
- Asilus bicolor Olivier, 1789
- Asilus bicolor [homonym] Heer, 1849
- Asilus bipartitus Macquart, 1849
- Asilus bojus Schrank, 1803
- Asilus bombylius Villers, 1789
- Asilus bombylius [homonym] Lichtenstein, 1796
- Asilus brunneitibius Zhang, 1989
- Asilus caeruleiventris Macquart, 1846
- Asilus carolinae Martin & Wilcox, 1965
- Asilus cinereus (Scopoli, 1763)
- Asilus citus Hine, 1918
- Asilus claripes Macquart, 1838
- Asilus colombiae Macquart, 1838
- Asilus comosus Hine, 1918
- Asilus consanguineus Macquart, 1846
- Asilus crabroniformis Linnaeus, 1758
- Asilus curculionis Melander, 1947
- Asilus cyanus Lynch Arribálzaga, 1880
- Asilus delicatulus Hine, 1918
- Asilus deperditus Heer, 1849
- Asilus dioctriaeformis Macquart, 1846
- Asilus enitens Walker, 1871
- Asilus erax Müller, 1776
- Asilus fallaciosus Matsumura, 1916
- Asilus fasciatus Rossi, 1790
- Asilus fattigi Bromley, 1940
- Asilus festivus Meigen, 1835
- Asilus filiferus Macquart, 1846
- Asilus filiformis Olivier, 1789
- Asilus flavipes Villers, 1789
- Asilus florissantinus James, 1939
- Asilus forficula Macquart, 1846
- Asilus frosti Bromley, 1950
- Asilus fulvus Rossi, 1790
- Asilus fuscipes Villers, 1789
- Asilus gabonicus Macquart, 1855
- Asilus gamaxus Walker, 1851
- Asilus glaucus Zetterstedt, 1855
- Asilus gracilipes Meigen, 1820
- Asilus gurnetensis Cockerell, 1921
- Asilus herdonius Walker, 1851
- Asilus hopponis Matsumura, 1916
- Asilus hubbelli Bromley, 1950
- Asilus humilis Bellardi, 1861
- Asilus ignauus Müller, 1764
- Asilus ignotus Westwood, 1845
- Asilus imitator Lynch Arribálzaga, 1883
- Asilus inamatus Walker, 1860
- Asilus incomptus Philippi, 1865
- Asilus laetus Wiedemann, 1824
- Asilus lebasii Macquart, 1838
- Asilus limbipennis Macquart, 1855
- Asilus litoralis Contarini, 1847
- Asilus longicella Macquart, 1850
- Asilus lucidus Pallas, 1818
- Asilus lusitanicus Linnaeus, 1767
- Asilus maculatus Müller, 1766
- Asilus marginatus Meigen, 1820
- Asilus marginatus Geoffroy, 1785
- Asilus marginellus Schrank, 1803
- Asilus maurus Linnaeus, 1758
- Asilus megastylus Philippi, 1865
- Asilus melanacrus Wiedemann, 1828
- Asilus melanotarsus Lichtenstein, 1796
- Asilus melanotrichus Brullé, 1832
- Asilus mellipes Wiedemann, 1828
- Asilus mexicanus Macquart, 1846
- Asilus misao Macquart, 1855
- Asilus morio Linnaeus, 1758
- Asilus morio [homonym] Fabricius, 1794
- Asilus natalicus Macquart, 1855
- Asilus nebulosus Matsumura, 1911
- Asilus nigellus Lichtenstein, 1796
- Asilus nigerrimus Schrank, 1781
- Asilus nigribarbis Macquart, 1846
- Asilus nigrinus [homonym] Macquart, 1848
- Asilus obscurellus Macquart, 1850
- Asilus okinawensis Matsumura, 1916
- Asilus palaeolestes Cockerell, 1921
- Asilus peritulus Cockerell, 1909
- Asilus piceus (Hine, 1909)
- Asilus platitarsatus Contarini, 1847
- Asilus platyceras (Hine, 1922)
- Asilus podagricus Schrank, 1803
- Asilus poecilopus Philippi, 1865
- Asilus pubescens Gmelin, 1790
- Asilus pumilus Macquart, 1834
- Asilus punctatus Macquart, 1834
- Asilus pusio Wiedemann, 1819
- Asilus regius Jaennicke, 1867
- Asilus rufibarbis [homonym] Macquart, 1849
- Asilus rufipalpis Macquart, 1838
- Asilus sabulosus Contarini, 1847
- Asilus sackeni Banks, 1920
- Asilus sannoisiensis Meunier, 1915
- Asilus saulcyi Macquart, 1838
- Asilus schedius Walker, 1849
- Asilus scutellatus Macquart, 1834
- Asilus sericans Walker, 1857
- Asilus sericeus Say, 1823
- Asilus servillei Macquart, 1834
- Asilus striatus Gmelin, 1790
- Asilus superveniens Walker, 1859
- Asilus tangeri Walker, 1855
- Asilus tarsosus Geoffroy, 1785
- Asilus tasmaniae Macquart, 1838
- Asilus tatius Walker, 1851
- Asilus tenuiventris Macquart, 1855
- Asilus tesselatus Brullé, 1832
- Asilus therevinus Rondani, 1850
- Asilus tibialis Pallas, 1818
- Asilus tibialis [homonym 1] Gimmerthal, 1847
- Asilus tibialis [homonym 2] Rondani, 1850
- Asilus tingitanus Boisduval, 1835
- Asilus trichurus Meunier, 1899
- Asilus trifarius Macquart, 1838
- Asilus tristis Wiedemann, 1828
- Asilus versicolor Meigen, 1830
- Asilus vescus Hine, 1918
- Asilus villosus Gmelin, 1790
- Asilus viridescens Villers, 1789
- Asilus viridis Geoffroy, 1785
- Asilus wickhami Cockerell, 1915

== Asiola ==
- Asiola atkinsi Daniels, 1977
- Asiola blasio (Walker, 1849)
- Asiola fasciata Daniels, 1977
- Asiola lemniscata Daniels, 1977

== Aspidopyga ==
- Aspidopyga cophuroides Carrera, 1949

== Astochia ==
- Astochia africana (Ricardo, 1919)
- Astochia annulipes Hermann, 1917
- Astochia armata (Becker, 1909)
- Astochia bromleyi Joseph & Parui, 1984
- Astochia canis Bromley, 1935
- Astochia caspica Hermann, 1917
- Astochia ceylonica (Ricardo, 1919)
- Astochia cirrisetosa Daniels, 1983
- Astochia completa (Becker, 1926)
- Astochia determinata (Walker, 1860)
- Astochia flava Scarbrough, 2004
- Astochia grisea (Wiedemann, 1821)
- Astochia guptai Joseph & Parui, 1981
- Astochia hindostani (Ricardo, 1919)
- Astochia hircus (Fabricius, 1805)
- Astochia hulli Joseph & Parui, 1970
- Astochia indica Joseph & Parui, 1984
- Astochia inermis Hermann, 1917
- Astochia introducens (Walker, 1859)
- Astochia jayarami Joseph & Parui, 1981
- Astochia karikalensis Joseph & Parui, 1990
- Astochia lancealata Scarbrough, 2004
- Astochia longistylus (Wiedemann, 1828)
- Astochia maculipes (Walker, 1855)
- Astochia melanopygus Wulp, 1899
- Astochia metatarsata Becker, 1913
- Astochia muralidharani Joseph & Parui, 1987
- Astochia neavensis (Ricardo, 1919)
- Astochia nigranta Scarbrough, 2004
- Astochia nigrinus (Ricardo, 1919)
- Astochia philus (Walker, 1849)
- Astochia pseudoguptai Joseph & Parui, 1987
- Astochia rami Joseph & Parui, 1992
- Astochia scalaris Hermann, 1917
- Astochia shishodiai Joseph & Parui, 1993
- Astochia silcharensis Joseph & Parui, 1984
- Astochia sodalis (Wulp, 1899)
- Astochia spinicauda (Wulp, 1898)
- Astochia strachani Oldroyd, 1970
- Astochia tarsalis (Ricardo, 1919)
- Astochia tiwarii Joseph & Parui, 1981
- Astochia trichura Hermann, 1917
- Astochia trigemina Becker, 1925
- Astochia virgatipes (Coquillett, 1898)

== Astylopogon ==
- Astylopogon catharinae Meijere, 1913

== Aterpogon ==
- Aterpogon cyrtopogonoides Hardy, 1930

== Atomosia ==
- Atomosia anacaona Scarbrough & Perez-Gelabert, 2006
- Atomosia anonyma Williston, 1901
- Atomosia appendiculata Macquart, 1846
- Atomosia argyrophora Schiner, 1868
- Atomosia armata Hermann, 1912
- Atomosia barbiellinii Curran, 1935
- Atomosia beckeri Jaennicke, 1867
- Atomosia bequaerti Bromley, 1934
- Atomosia bigoti Bellardi, 1861
- Atomosia cerverai Bromley, 1929
- Atomosia ciguaya Scarbrough & Perez-Gelabert, 2006
- Atomosia coxalis Curran, 1930
- Atomosia cyanescens Rondani, 1848
- Atomosia danforthi Curran, 1935
- Atomosia dasypus (Wiedemann, 1828)
- Atomosia echemon (Walker, 1849)
- Atomosia fredericoi Carrera, 1952
- Atomosia frontalis Curran, 1930
- Atomosia geniculata (Wiedemann, 1821)
- Atomosia glabrata (Say, 1823)
- Atomosia hondurana James, 1953
- Atomosia jagua Scarbrough & Perez-Gelabert, 2006
- Atomosia jimagua Scarbrough & Perez-Gelabert, 2006
- Atomosia limbata (Macquart, 1834)
- Atomosia limbiventris Thomson, 1869
- Atomosia lineata Curran, 1930
- Atomosia macquarti Bellardi, 1861
- Atomosia maestrae Bromley, 1929
- Atomosia melanopogon Hermann, 1912
- Atomosia metallescens Hermann, 1912
- Atomosia metallica Bromley, 1929
- Atomosia mucida Osten-Sacken, 1887
- Atomosia mucidoides Bromley, 1951
- Atomosia nigroaenea Walker, 1851
- Atomosia nuda Hermann, 1912
- Atomosia panamensis Curran, 1930
- Atomosia pilipes Thomson, 1869
- Atomosia pubescens Bromley, 1929
- Atomosia puella (Wiedemann, 1828)
- Atomosia punctifera Hermann, 1912
- Atomosia pusilla Macquart, 1838
- Atomosia rica Curran, 1935
- Atomosia rosalesi Carrera & Machado-Allison, 1963
- Atomosia rufipes Macquart, 1847
- Atomosia sayii Johnson, 1903
- Atomosia scoriacea (Wiedemann, 1828)
- Atomosia selene Curran, 1935
- Atomosia sericans Walker, 1860
- Atomosia setosa Hermann, 1912
- Atomosia similis Bigot, 1856
- Atomosia tenuis Curran, 1930
- Atomosia tibialis Macquart, 1846
- Atomosia unicolor Macquart, 1838
- Atomosia venustula Lynch Arribálzaga, 1880
- Atomosia yurabia Scarbrough & Perez-Gelabert, 2006

== Atoniomyia ==
- Atoniomyia albifacies (Hermann, 1912)
- Atoniomyia ancylocera (Schiner, 1868)
- Atoniomyia brevistylata (Williston, 1901)
- Atoniomyia duncani (Wilcox, 1937)
- Atoniomyia fulvipes Carrera, 1946
- Atoniomyia grossa Carrera, 1946
- Atoniomyia hispidella (Hermann, 1912)
- Atoniomyia laterepunctata (Hermann, 1912)
- Atoniomyia mikii (Williston, 1886)
- Atoniomyia mollis (Hermann, 1912)
- Atoniomyia pinguis (Hermann, 1912)
- Atoniomyia scalarata (Hermann, 1912)
- Atoniomyia setigera (Hermann, 1912)
- Atoniomyia viduata (Wiedemann, 1819)

== Atractia ==
- Atractia psilogaster (Wiedemann, 1828)
- Atractia pulverulenta Schiner, 1867

== Atractocoma ==
- Atractocoma nivosa Artigas, 1970

== Austenmyia ==
- Austenmyia amazona Carrera, 1955

== Austrosaropogon ==
- Austrosaropogon barbula Daniels, 1991
- Austrosaropogon celaenops Daniels, 1991
- Austrosaropogon claviger Hardy, 1934
- Austrosaropogon gephyrion Daniels, 1991
- Austrosaropogon horsleyi (Walker, 1851)
- Austrosaropogon insulanus Daniels, 1991
- Austrosaropogon melanops Daniels, 1991
- Austrosaropogon montanus Daniels, 1991
- Austrosaropogon nigrinus (Macquart, 1850)
- Austrosaropogon nigritibia Daniels, 1991
- Austrosaropogon palleucus Daniels, 1991
- Austrosaropogon periscelis Daniels, 1991
- Austrosaropogon thule Daniels, 1991

== Aymarasilus ==
- Aymarasilus inti Artigas, 1974
