= List of Asilus species =

This is a list of 151 species in Asilus, a genus of robber flies in the family Asilidae.

== Asilus species ==
- Asilus aethiops Pallas, 1771^{c g}
- Asilus agrius Walker, 1849^{c g}
- Asilus albifrons (Gmelin, 1790)^{c g}
- Asilus albipilosus Macquart, 1846^{c g}
- Asilus amphinome Walker, 1849^{i g}
- Asilus annulatus Fabricius, 1775^{c g}
- Asilus antiphus Walker, 1849^{c g}
- Asilus aqualicus (Scopoli, 1763)^{c g}
- Asilus argyrocnemus (Lichtenstein, 1796)^{c g}
- Asilus armatus (Geoffroy, 1785)^{c g}
- Asilus aurimystax Bromley, 1928^{c g}
- Asilus auripilus Meigen, 1830^{c g}
- Asilus baikalensis Becker & Schnabl, 1926^{c g}
- Asilus baletus Walker, 1849^{c g}
- Asilus barbarus Linnæus, 1758^{c g}
- Asilus bariventris Rondani, 1850^{c g}
- Asilus bicinctus Müller, 1776^{c g}
- Asilus bicolor Olivier, 1789^{c g}
- Asilus biparitus Macquart, 1849^{c g}
- Asilus bojus Schrank, 1803^{c g}
- Asilus bombylius (Lichtenstein, 1796)^{g}
- Asilus caeruleiventris Macquart, 1846^{c g}
- Asilus calatinus Walker, 1849^{c g}
- Asilus calidus Fabricius, 1787^{g}
- Asilus chrysauges Osten Sacken, 1887^{c g}
- Asilus cinereus (Scopoli, 1763)^{g}
- Asilus claripes Macquart, 1838^{c g}
- Asilus clavatus Macquart, 1838^{c g}
- Asilus colombiae Macquart, 1838^{c g}
- Asilus concepcionensis Bromley, 1932^{c g}
- Asilus consanguineus Macquart, 1846^{c g}
- Asilus crabroniformis Linnæus, 1758^{c g}
- Asilus crassus Bromley, 1932^{c g}
- Asilus cristatus Wiedemann, 1820^{c g}
- Asilus culicifromis (Thunberg, 1791)^{c g}
- Asilus cuyanus Lynch Arribalzaga, 1880^{c g}
- Asilus delector Harris, 1780^{c g}
- Asilus dioctriaeformis Macquart, 1846^{c g}
- Asilus enitens Walker, 1871^{c g}
- Asilus ephippium Macquart, 1855^{c g}
- Asilus erax Müller, 1776^{c g}
- Asilus fallaciosus Matsumura, 1916^{c g}
- Asilus fasciatus Rossi, 1790^{c g}
- Asilus fasciculatus Villers, 1789^{c g}
- Asilus ferugineus (Olivier, 1789)^{c g}
- Asilus festivus Meigen, 1835^{c g}
- Asilus filiferus (Macquart, 1846)^{c g}
- Asilus filiformis Olivier, 1789^{c g}
- Asilus flavipes Villers, 1789^{c g}
- Asilus forficula Macquart, 1846^{c g}
- Asilus fulcratus (Scopoli, 1763)^{c g}
- Asilus fulvopterus Geoffroy, 1785^{c g}
- Asilus fulvus Rossi, 1790^{c g}
- Asilus fuscipes Villers, 1789^{c g}
- Asilus gabonicus Macquart, 1855^{c g}
- Asilus gamaxus Walker, 1851^{c g}
- Asilus gavius Walker, 1851^{c g}
- Asilus gigas (Lichtenstein, 1796)^{c g}
- Asilus glaber Olivier, 1789^{c g}
- Asilus glaucus Zetterstedt, 1855^{c g}
- Asilus gracilipes Meigen, 1820^{c g}
- Asilus harpax (Lichtenstein, 1796)^{c g}
- Asilus hebes Walker, 1855^{c g}
- Asilus herdonius Walker, 1851^{c g}
- Asilus heydenii Wiedemann, 1828^{c g}
- Asilus hilarii Macquart, 1838^{c g}
- Asilus ignauus Müller, 1764^{c g}
- Asilus imitator Lynch Arribalzaga, 1883^{c g}
- Asilus inamatus Walker, 1860^{c g}
- Asilus lacrymosus (Geoffroy, 1785)^{c g}
- Asilus laetus Wiedemann, 1824^{c g}
- Asilus lebasii Macquart, 1838^{c g}
- Asilus leonides Walker, 1851^{c g}
- Asilus leucopterus (Thunberg, 1789)^{c g}
- Asilus limbipennis Macquart, 1855^{c g}
- Asilus litoralis Contarini, 1847^{c g}
- Asilus longicella (Macquart, 1850)^{c g}
- Asilus longiusculus Walker, 1855^{c g}
- Asilus lucidus Pallas, 1818^{c g}
- Asilus luctuosus Macquart, 1838^{c g}
- Asilus lusitanicus (Linnaeus, 1767)^{c g}
- Asilus lutipes Wiedemann, 1828^{c g}
- Asilus lycorius Walker, 1851^{c g}
- Asilus maculatus Meigen, 1804^{g}
- Asilus maculifemora Macquart, 1855^{c g}
- Asilus marginatus Meigen, 1820^{g}
- Asilus marginellus Schrank, 1803^{c g}
- Asilus maurus Linnæus, 1758^{c g}
- Asilus megastylus Philippi, 1865^{c g}
- Asilus melanacrus Wiedemann, 1828^{c g}
- Asilus melanotarsus (Lichtenstein, 1796)^{c g}
- Asilus melanotrichus Brullé, 1833^{c g}
- Asilus mellipes Wiedemann, 1828^{c g}
- Asilus minos Wiedemann, 1824^{c g}
- Asilus misao Macquart, 1855^{c g}
- Asilus morio (Linnaeus, 1758)^{g}
- Asilus mucronatus Scopoli, 1763^{c g}
- Asilus natalicus Macquart, 1855^{c g}
- Asilus nigellus (Lichtenstein, 1796)^{c g}
- Asilus nigerrimus Schrank, 1781^{c g}
- Asilus nigribarbis Macquart, 1846^{c g}
- Asilus nigrinus Macquart, 1848^{c g}
- Asilus nitidus (Lichtenstein, 1796)^{c g}
- Asilus obscurellus (Macquart, 1850)^{c g}
- Asilus occidentalis Philippi, 1865^{c g}
- Asilus pellopygos (Lichtenstein, 1796)^{c g}
- Asilus peticus Walker, 1849^{c g}
- Asilus platitarsatus Contarini, 1847^{c g}
- Asilus poecilopus Philippi, 1865^{c g}
- Asilus pubescens Gmelin, 1790^{c g}
- Asilus pumilus Macquart, 1834^{c g}
- Asilus punctatus Macquart, 1834^{c g}
- Asilus pusio (Wiedemann, 1819)^{c g}
- Asilus raptor (Lichtenstein, 1796)^{c g}
- Asilus regius (Jaennicke, 1867)^{c g}
- Asilus rufibarbis Macquart, 1850^{c g}
- Asilus rufipalpis Macquart, 1838^{c g}
- Asilus russatus (Lichtenstein, 1796)^{c g}
- Asilus sabulosus Contarini, 1847^{c g}
- Asilus saulcyi Macquart, 1838^{c g}
- Asilus schaefferi (Geoffroy, 1785)^{c g}
- Asilus schedius Walker, 1849^{c g}
- Asilus sericans Walker, 1857^{c g}
- Asilus sericeus Say, 1823^{i c g b}
- Asilus servillei Macquart, 1834^{c g}
- Asilus sexmaculatus Walker, 1855^{c g}
- Asilus striatus Gmelin, 1790^{c g}
- Asilus superveniens (Walker, 1859)^{c g}
- Asilus tangeri Walker, 1855^{c g}
- Asilus tarsosus Geffroy, 1785^{c g}
- Asilus tasmaniae (Macquart, 1838)^{c g}
- Asilus tatius Walker, 1851^{c g}
- Asilus tenuiventris Macquart, 1855^{c g}
- Asilus tessellatus Brullé, 1833^{c g}
- Asilus therevinus Rondani, 1851^{c g}
- Asilus therimachus Walker, 1851^{c g}
- Asilus tibialis Pallas, 1818^{g}
- Asilus tingitanus Boisduval, 1835^{c g}
- Asilus trifarius Macquart, 1838^{c g}
- Asilus triopas ^{g}
- Asilus tristis Wiedemann, 1828^{c g}
- Asilus undulatus (Geoffroy, 1785)^{c g}
- Asilus veriscolor Meigen, 1830^{c g}
- Asilus villosus Gmelin, 1790^{c g}
- Asilus viridescens Villers, 1789^{c g}
- Asilus viridis Geoffroy, 1785^{c g}
- Asilus vittatus Oliver, 1789^{c g}
- Asilus willistoni Hine, 1909^{i g}
- Asilus xanthocerus Williston, 1901^{c g}

Data sources: i = ITIS, c = Catalogue of Life, g = GBIF, b = Bugguide.net
