= Andrenosoma atra =

Scientific classification
- Kingdom: Animalia
- Phylum: Arthropoda
- Class: Insecta
- Order: Diptera
- Family: Asilidae
- Genus: Andrenosoma
- Species: A. atra

Binomial name
- Andrenosoma atra (Linnaeus, 1758)

Species of fly

Andrenosoma atra is a species of fly belonging to the family Asilidae.

It is native to Europe.
