= Andrenosoma fulvicaudum =

Scientific classification
- Kingdom: Animalia
- Phylum: Arthropoda
- Clade: Pancrustacea
- Class: Insecta
- Order: Diptera
- Family: Asilidae
- Genus: Andrenosoma
- Species: A. fulvicaudum

Binomial name
- Andrenosoma fulvicaudum (Say, 1823)

Synonyms
- Laphria fulvicauda Say, 1823; Nusa lutea McAtee, 1919

Species of fly

Andrenosoma fulvicaudum is a species of robber fly in the family Asilidae. It was first formally named as Laphria fulvicauda by Thomas Say in 1823. The type specimen was from Missouri, but was lost.

== Description ==
Andrenosoma fulvicaudum reaches 15–20 mm (0.59–0.79 in) in length.

The head is covered with white hair. Mustache (mystax) black, stout bristles. Some black bristles around antenna base.

The antennae are black and short with 3 joints.

The thorax is black and gray with two wide black stripes down the center. The thorax sides (pleura) have long, white hair. Segment 2 (scutellum) is small with black bristles.

Wings: Dark, blackish. Veins smudged brownish.

Legs: Black with long white hair. Feet have shorter black bristles. Toes yellow.

Abdomen: Blue-black on 1st 4 segments, covered with long white hair on sides. Last 3 (sometimes 4) segments reddish-brown. Female ovipositor pointed, brownish.

== Habitat ==
Andrena fulvicaudum occurs in dry, sandy locations with trees. It rests on logs, trunks, and stumps in sunlight.

== Biology ==
It eats bees and wasps; in one report it ate wood boring beetles. It flies in July and August.

Adults are found on tree trunks. Larvae and pupa have been collected under oak log bark in cells of the buprestid Chrysobothris femorata.
