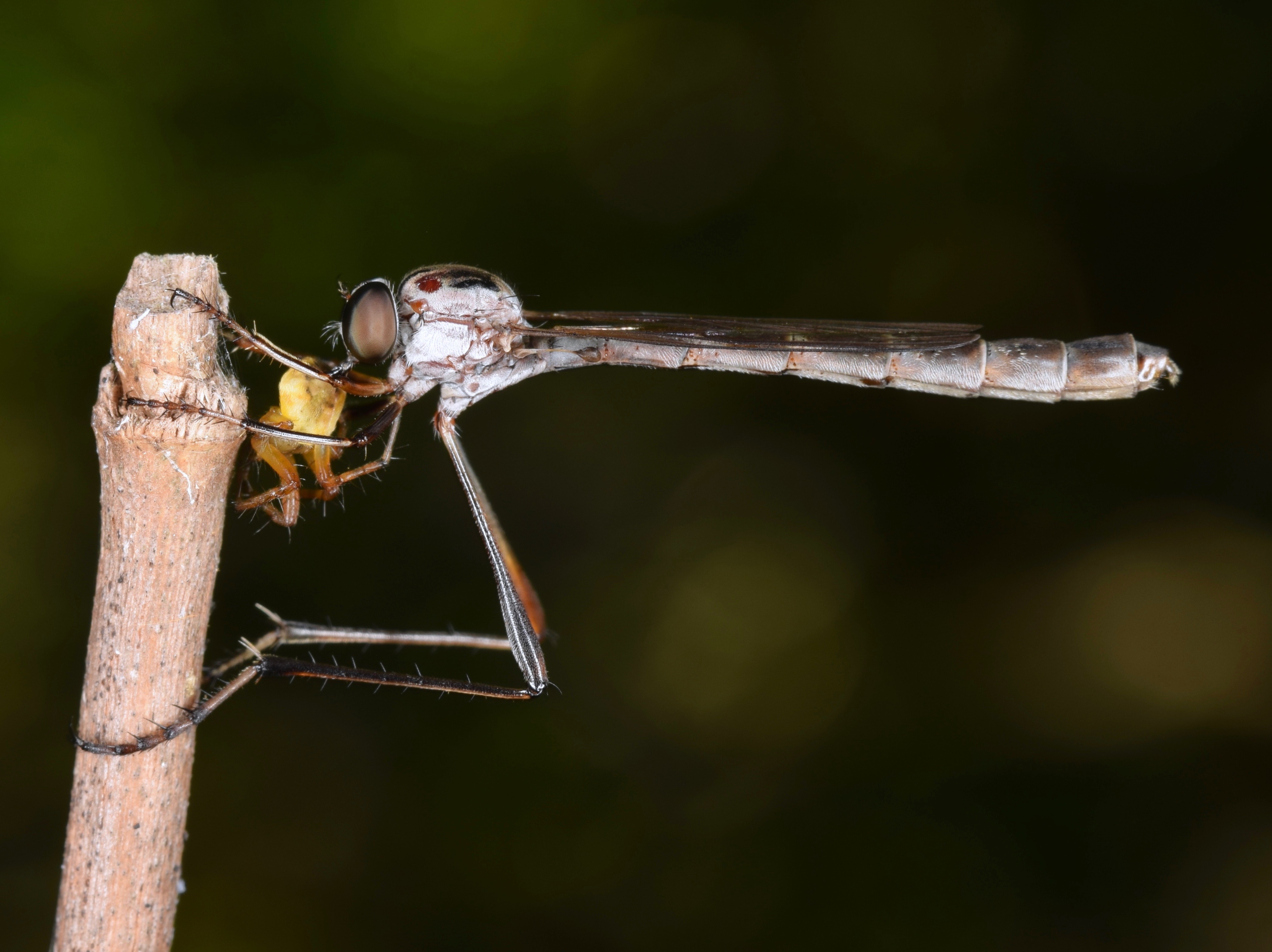
- Apachekolos tenuipes

Scientific classification
- Kingdom: Animalia
- Phylum: Arthropoda
- Clade: Pancrustacea
- Class: Insecta
- Order: Diptera
- Family: Asilidae
- Subfamily: Leptogastrinae
- Genus: Apachekolos; Martin, 1957

= Apachekolos =

Genus of flies

Apachekolos is a genus of robber flies in the family Asilidae, described by Martin in 1957; the genus name was explicitly designated as feminine in gender.

== Species ==
These 11 species belong to the genus Apachekolos:

- Apachekolos clavipes (Johnson, 1897)
- Apachekolos confusio Martin, 1957 (Arizona Pixie)
- Apachekolos crinita Martin, 1957 (Hairy-backed Pixie)
- Apachekolos flaventis Scarbrough & Perez-Gelabert, 2005
- Apachekolos invasa Scarbrough & Perez-Gelabert, 2005
- Apachekolos magna Scarbrough & Perez-Gelabert, 2005
- Apachekolos scapularis (Bigot, 1878) (Hairy-footed Pixie)
- Apachekolos tenuipes (Loew, 1862) (Thin-legged Pixie)
- Apachekolos volubilis Scarbrough & Perez-Gelabert, 2005
- Apachekolos vultus Scarbrough & Perez-Gelabert, 2005
- Apachekolos weslacensis (Bromley, 1951) (Weslaco Pixie)
