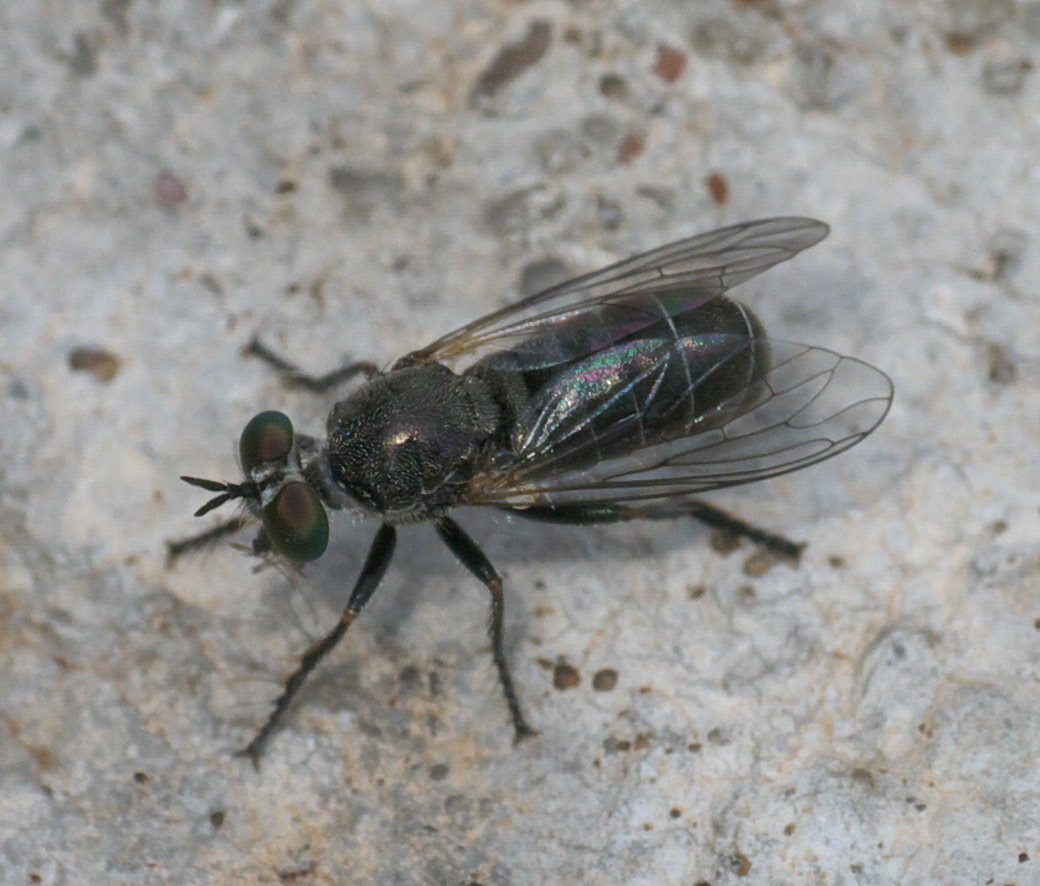

Scientific classification
- Domain: Eukaryota
- Kingdom: Animalia
- Phylum: Arthropoda
- Class: Insecta
- Order: Diptera
- Family: Asilidae
- Genus: Atomosia
- Species: A. melanopogon

Binomial name
- Atomosia melanopogon Hermann, 1912

= Atomosia melanopogon =

Species of insect

Atomosia melanopogon is a species of robber flies in the family Asilidae.
