= Andrenosoma hesperium =

Scientific classification
- Kingdom: Animalia
- Phylum: Arthropoda
- Clade: Pancrustacea
- Class: Insecta
- Order: Diptera
- Family: Asilidae
- Genus: Andrenosoma
- Species: A. hesperium

Binomial name
- Andrenosoma hesperium Martin, 1966

Species of fly

Andrenosoma hesperium is a species of robber fly in the family Asilidae.
