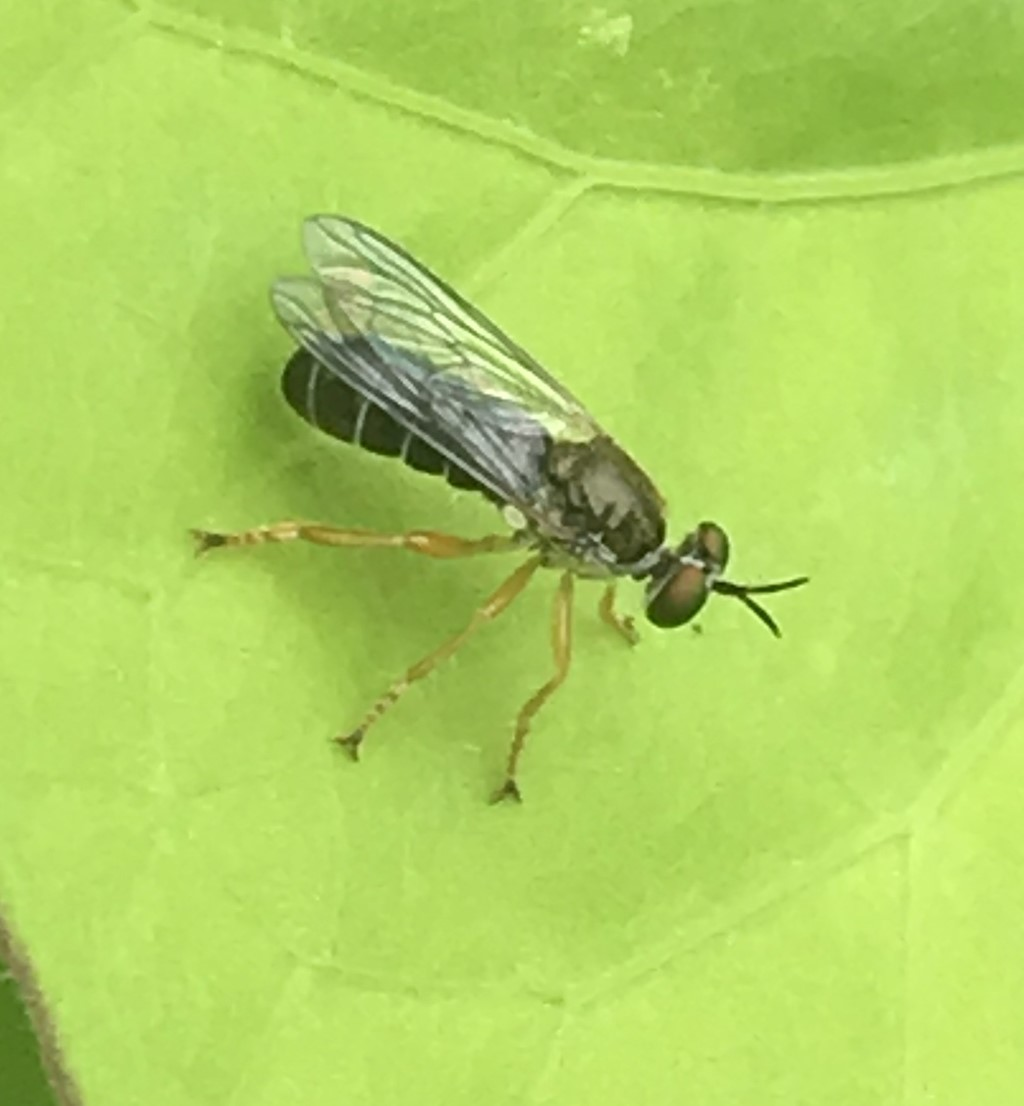

Scientific classification
- Domain: Eukaryota
- Kingdom: Animalia
- Phylum: Arthropoda
- Class: Insecta
- Order: Diptera
- Family: Asilidae
- Genus: Atomosia
- Species: A. sayii

Binomial name
- Atomosia sayii Johnson, 1903

= Atomosia sayii =

Species of fly

Atomosia sayii is a species of robber flies in the family Asilidae.
