= Apachekolos scapularis =

Scientific classification
- Domain: Eukaryota
- Kingdom: Animalia
- Phylum: Arthropoda
- Class: Insecta
- Order: Diptera
- Family: Asilidae
- Genus: Apachekolos
- Species: A. scapularis

Binomial name
- Apachekolos scapularis (Bigot, 1878)

Synonyms
- Leptogaster scapularis Bigot, 1878

Species of fly

Apachekolos scapularis is a species of robber flies in the family Asilidae.
