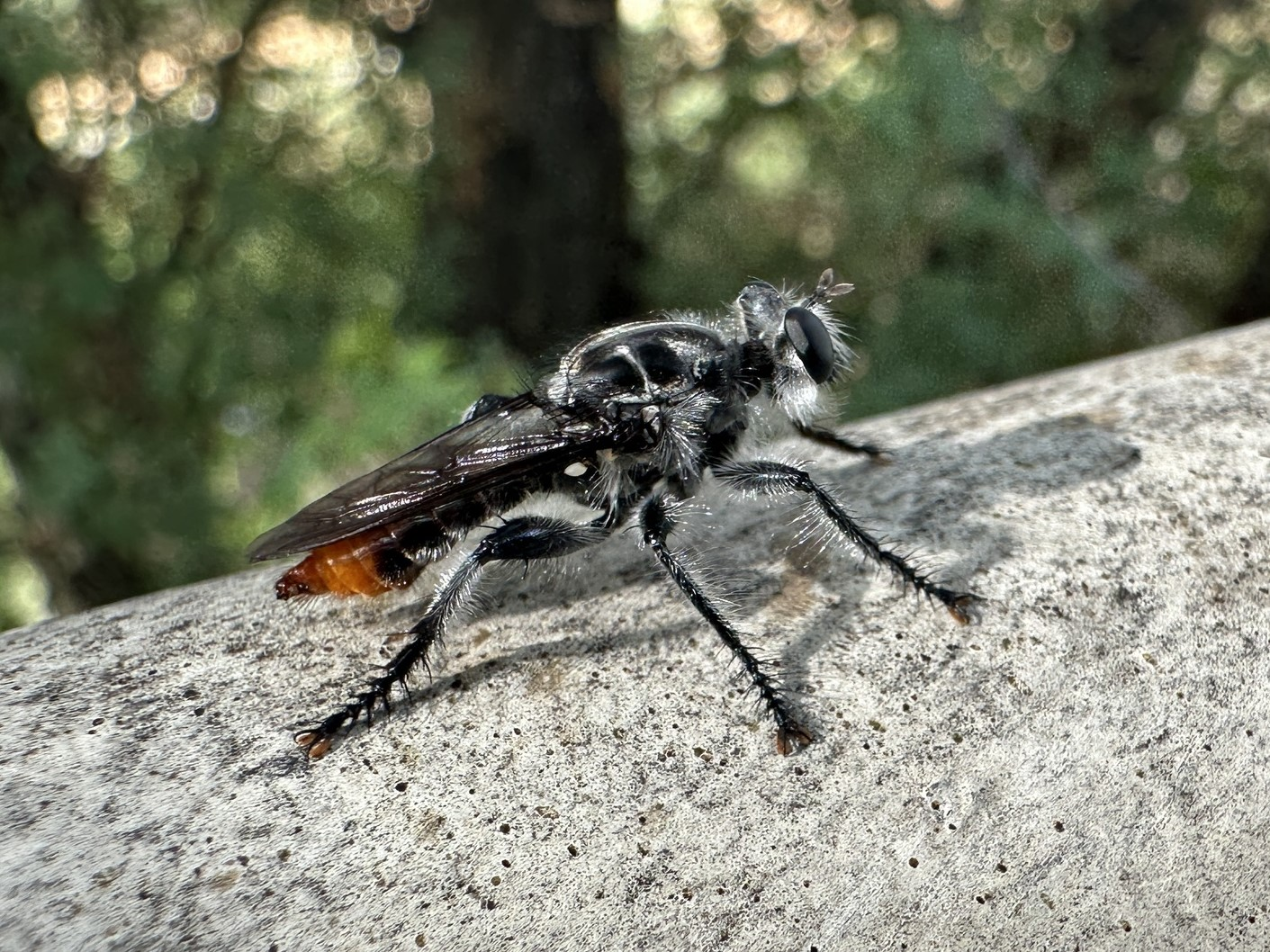

Scientific classification
- Domain: Eukaryota
- Kingdom: Animalia
- Phylum: Arthropoda
- Class: Insecta
- Order: Diptera
- Family: Asilidae
- Genus: Andrenosoma
- Species: A. igneum

Binomial name
- Andrenosoma igneum Bromley, 1929

= Andrenosoma igneum =

Species of fly

Andrenosoma igneum is a species of robber fly in the family Asilidae.
