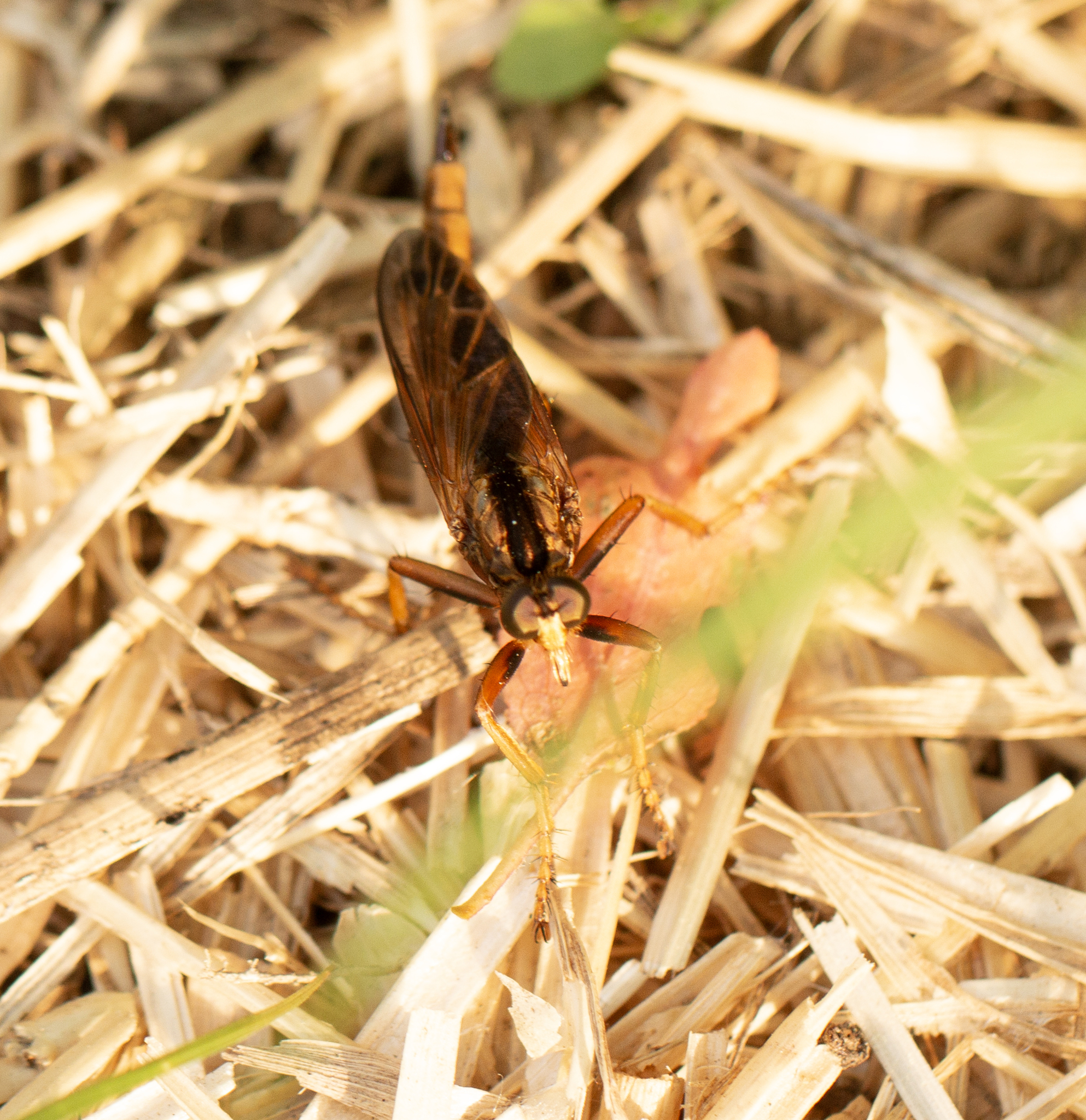
Butterflyhunter

Scientific classification
- Kingdom: Animalia
- Phylum: Arthropoda
- Clade: Pancrustacea
- Class: Insecta
- Order: Diptera
- Family: Asilidae
- Genus: Asilus
- Species: A. sericeus

Binomial name
- Asilus sericeus Say, 1823

Synonyms
- Asilus herminius Walker, 1849

= Asilus sericeus =

Species of insect

Asilus sericeus is a species of robber fly in the family Asilidae. The larvae measure 18 – 20 mm long and live underground. Adults catch prey in flight. They haven't been reported feeding on bees or wasps, like other members of the family.
