= Ablautus rufotibialis =

Scientific classification
- Kingdom: Animalia
- Phylum: Arthropoda
- Clade: Pancrustacea
- Class: Insecta
- Order: Diptera
- Family: Asilidae
- Genus: Ablautus
- Species: A. rufotibialis

Binomial name
- Ablautus rufotibialis Back, 1909

Species of fly

Ablautus rufotibialis is a species of robber flies in the family Asilidae.
