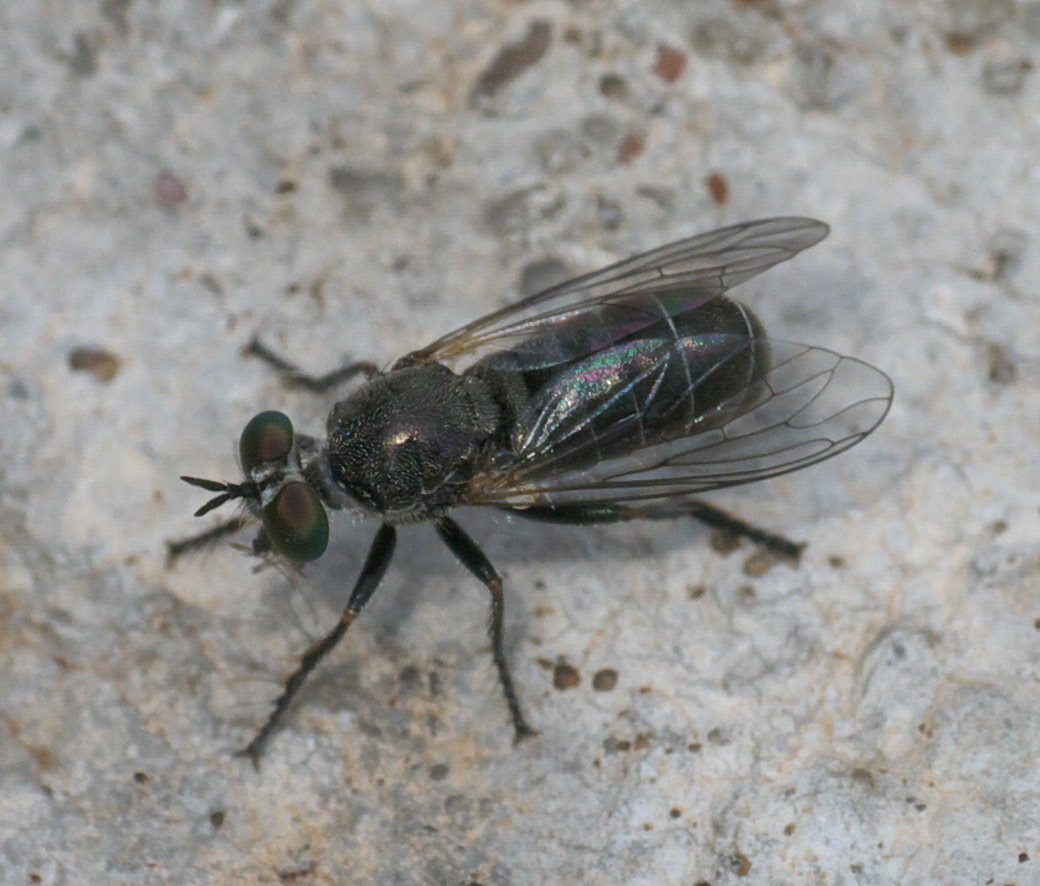
- Atomosia melanopogon

Scientific classification
- Domain: Eukaryota
- Kingdom: Animalia
- Phylum: Arthropoda
- Class: Insecta
- Order: Diptera
- Family: Asilidae
- Subfamily: Laphriinae
- Genus: Atomosia; Macquart, 1838

= Atomosia =

Genus of flies

Atomosia is a genus of robber flies in the family Asilidae. There are at least 60 described species in Atomosia.

== Species ==
These 61 species belong to the genus Atomosia:

- Atomosia affinis Macquart, 1850^{c g}
- Atomosia anacaona Scarbrough & Perez-Gelabert, 2006^{c g}
- Atomosia andrenoides Bromley, 1934^{c g}
- Atomosia anonyma Williston, 1901^{c g}
- Atomosia appendiculata Macquart, 1846^{c g}
- Atomosia argyrophora Schiner, 1868^{c g}
- Atomosia arkansensis Barnes, 2008^{c g b}
- Atomosia armata Hermann, 1912^{c g}
- Atomosia barbiellinii Curran, 1935^{c g}
- Atomosia beckeri Jaennicke, 1867^{c g}
- Atomosia bequaerti Bromley, 1934^{c g}
- Atomosia bigoti Bellardi, 1861^{c g}
- Atomosia brevicornis Macquart, 1838^{c g}
- Atomosia cerverai Bromley, 1929^{c g}
- Atomosia ciguaya Scarbrough & Perez-Gelabert, 2006^{c g}
- Atomosia coxalis Curran, 1930^{c g}
- Atomosia cyanescens Rondani, 1848^{c g}
- Atomosia danforthi Curran, 1935^{c g}
- Atomosia echemon (Walker, 1849)^{i}
- Atomosia fredericom Carrera, 1952^{c g}
- Atomosia frontalis Curran, 1930^{c g}
- Atomosia geniculata (Wiedemann, 1821)^{c g}
- Atomosia glabrata Say^{i c g b}
- Atomosia hondurana James, 1953^{c g}
- Atomosia jagua Scarbrough & Perez-Gelabert, 2006^{c g}
- Atomosia jimagua Scarbrough & Perez-Gelabert, 2006^{c g}
- Atomosia limbata (Macquart, 1834)^{c g}
- Atomosia limbiventris Thomson, 1869^{c g}
- Atomosia lineata Curran, 1930^{c g}
- Atomosia macquarti Bellardi, 1861^{c g}
- Atomosia maestrae Bromley, 1929^{c g}
- Atomosia melanopogon Hermann, 1912^{i c g b}
- Atomosia metallescens Hermann, 1912^{c g}
- Atomosia metallica Bromley, 1929^{c g}
- Atomosia modesta (Philippi, 1865)^{c g}
- Atomosia mucida Osten Sacken, 1887^{i c g b}
- Atomosia mucidoides Bromley, 1951^{i}
- Atomosia nigroaenea Walker, 1851^{c g}
- Atomosia nuda Hermann, 1912^{c g}
- Atomosia panamensis Curran, 1930^{c g}
- Atomosia parva (Bigot, 1857)^{c g}
- Atomosia pilipes Thomson, 1869^{c g}
- Atomosia pubescens Bromley, 1929^{c g}
- Atomosia puella (Wiedemann, 1828)^{i c g b}
- Atomosia punctifera Hermann, 1912^{i c g}
- Atomosia pusilla Macquart, 1838^{i c g}
- Atomosia rica Curran, 1935^{c g}
- Atomosia rosalesi Carrera & Machado-Allison, 1963^{c g}
- Atomosia rufipes Macquart, 1847^{i c g b}
- Atomosia sayii Johnson, 1903^{i c g b}
- Atomosia scoriacea (Wiedemann, 1828)^{c g}
- Atomosia selene Curran, 1935^{c g}
- Atomosia sericans Walker, 1860^{c g}
- Atomosia setosa Hermann, 1912^{c g}
- Atomosia similis Bigot, 1856^{c g}
- Atomosia tenus Curran, 1930^{c g}
- Atomosia tibialis Macquart, 1846^{c g}
- Atomosia unicolor Macquart, 1838^{c g}
- Atomosia venustula Lynch Arribalzaga, 1880^{c g}
- Atomosia xanthopus (Wiedemann, 1828)^{c g}
- Atomosia yurabia Scarbrough & Perez-Gelabert, 2006^{c g}

Data sources: i = ITIS, c = Catalogue of Life, g = GBIF, b = Bugguide.net
