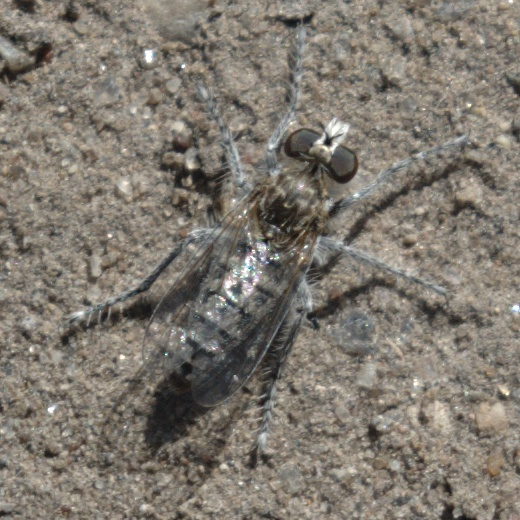

Scientific classification
- Kingdom: Animalia
- Phylum: Arthropoda
- Class: Insecta
- Order: Diptera
- Family: Asilidae
- Subfamily: Willistonininae
- Genus: Ablautus; Loew, 1866

Type species
- Ablautus trifarius Loew, 1866

Synonyms
- Ablautatus Loew, 1874

= Ablautus =

Genus of flies

Ablautus is a genus of robber flies in the family Asilidae.

== Species ==
- Ablautus arnaudi Wilcox, 1966
- Ablautus basini Wilcox, 1966
- Ablautus californicus Wilcox, 1935
- Ablautus coachellus Wilcox, 1966
- Ablautus colei Wilcox, 1966
- Ablautus coquilletti Wilcox, 1935
- Ablautus flavipes Coquillett, 1904
- Ablautus linsleyi Wilcox, 1966
- Ablautus mimus (Osten Sacken, 1877)
- Ablautus rubens Coquillett, 1904
- Ablautus rufotibialis Back, 1909
- Ablautus schlingeri Wilcox, 1966
- Ablautus trifarius Loew, 1866
- Ablautus vanduzeei Wilcox, 1935
