= Atomosia mucida =

Scientific classification
- Kingdom: Animalia
- Phylum: Arthropoda
- Class: Insecta
- Order: Diptera
- Family: Asilidae
- Genus: Atomosia
- Species: A. mucida

Binomial name
- Atomosia mucida Osten Sacken, 1887

Species of fly

Atomosia mucida is a species of robber flies in the family Asilidae.
