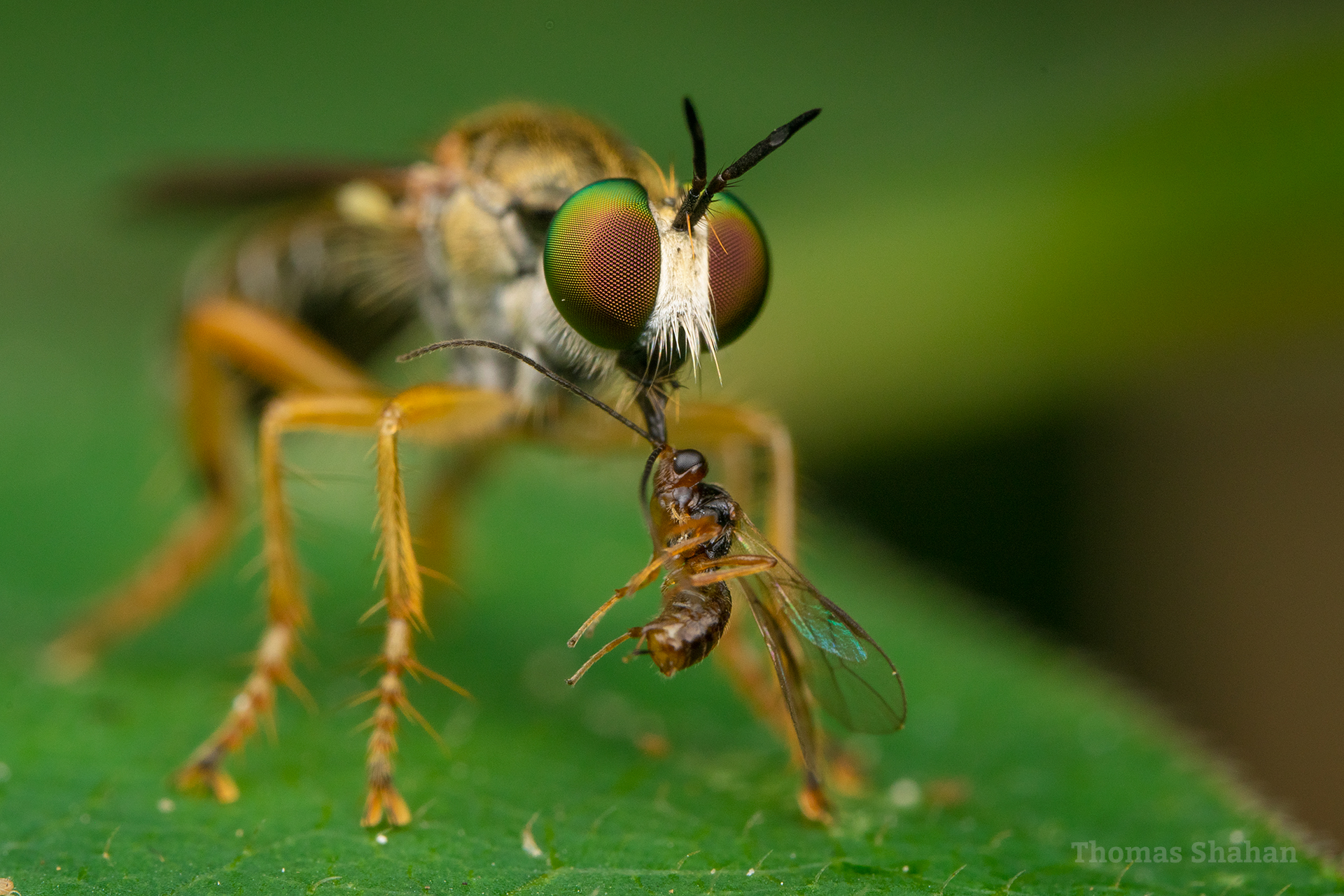

Scientific classification
- Domain: Eukaryota
- Kingdom: Animalia
- Phylum: Arthropoda
- Class: Insecta
- Order: Diptera
- Family: Asilidae
- Genus: Atomosia
- Species: A. rufipes

Binomial name
- Atomosia rufipes Macquart, 1847

Synonyms
- Atomosia soror Bigot, 1878

= Atomosia rufipes =

Species of fly

Atomosia rufipes is a species of robber flies in the family Asilidae.
