= Ablautus flavipes =

Scientific classification
- Domain: Eukaryota
- Kingdom: Animalia
- Phylum: Arthropoda
- Class: Insecta
- Order: Diptera
- Family: Asilidae
- Genus: Ablautus
- Species: A. flavipes

Binomial name
- Ablautus flavipes Coquillett, 1904

Species of fly

Ablautus flavipes is a species of robber fly in the family Asilidae.
