= Atoniomyia duncani =

Scientific classification
- Domain: Eukaryota
- Kingdom: Animalia
- Phylum: Arthropoda
- Class: Insecta
- Order: Diptera
- Family: Asilidae
- Genus: Atoniomyia
- Species: A. duncani

Binomial name
- Atoniomyia duncani (Wilcox, 1937)

Synonyms
- Atonia duncani Wilcox, 1937

Species of fly

Atoniomyia duncani is a species of robber flies in the family Asilidae.
