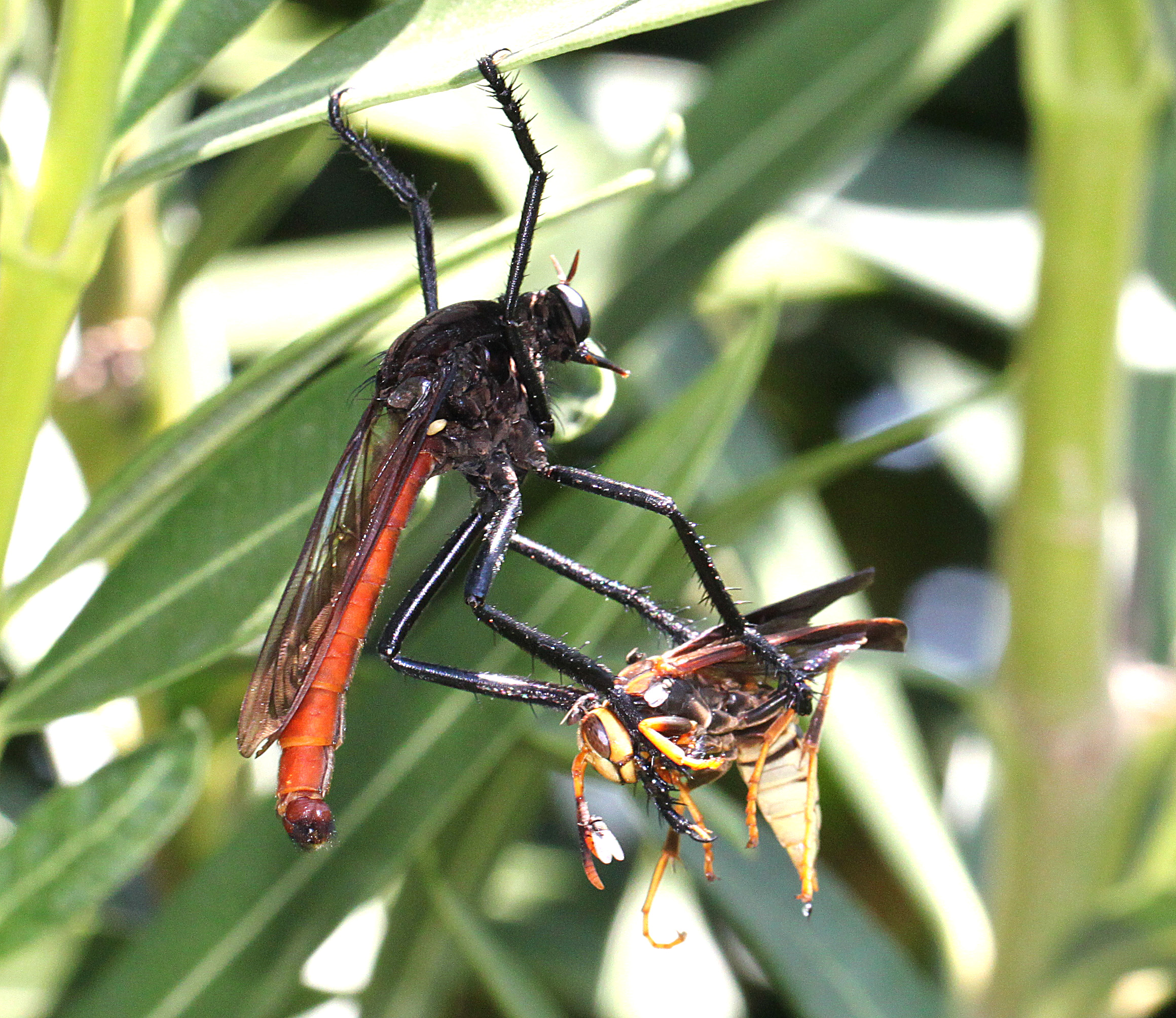
- Archilestris magnificus

Scientific classification
- Domain: Eukaryota
- Kingdom: Animalia
- Phylum: Arthropoda
- Class: Insecta
- Order: Diptera
- Family: Asilidae
- Subfamily: Stenopogoninae
- Genus: Archilestris; Loew, 1874

= Archilestris =

Genus of flies

Archilestris is a genus of robber flies in the family Asilidae. There are about six described species in Archilestris.

== Species ==
These six species belong to the genus Archilestris:

- Archilestris excellens Enderlein, 1914^{c g}
- Archilestris gapopterus (Wiedemann, 1828)^{c g}
- Archilestris geijskesi Papavero & Bernardi, 1974^{c g}
- Archilestris longipes (Macquart, 1838)^{c}
- Archilestris magnificus (Walker, 1854)^{i c g b}
- Archilestris wenzeli Papavero & Bernardi, 1974^{c g}

Data sources: i = ITIS, c = Catalogue of Life, g = GBIF, b = Bugguide.net
