= Atomosia glabrata =

Scientific classification
- Kingdom: Animalia
- Phylum: Arthropoda
- Class: Insecta
- Order: Diptera
- Family: Asilidae
- Genus: Atomosia
- Species: A. glabrata

Binomial name
- Atomosia glabrata Say

Synonyms
- Laphria glabrata Say, 1823

Species of fly

Atomosia glabrata is a species of robber flies in the family Asilidae. It can be found in the United States, where it is closely associated with recently burned prairie habitat.
