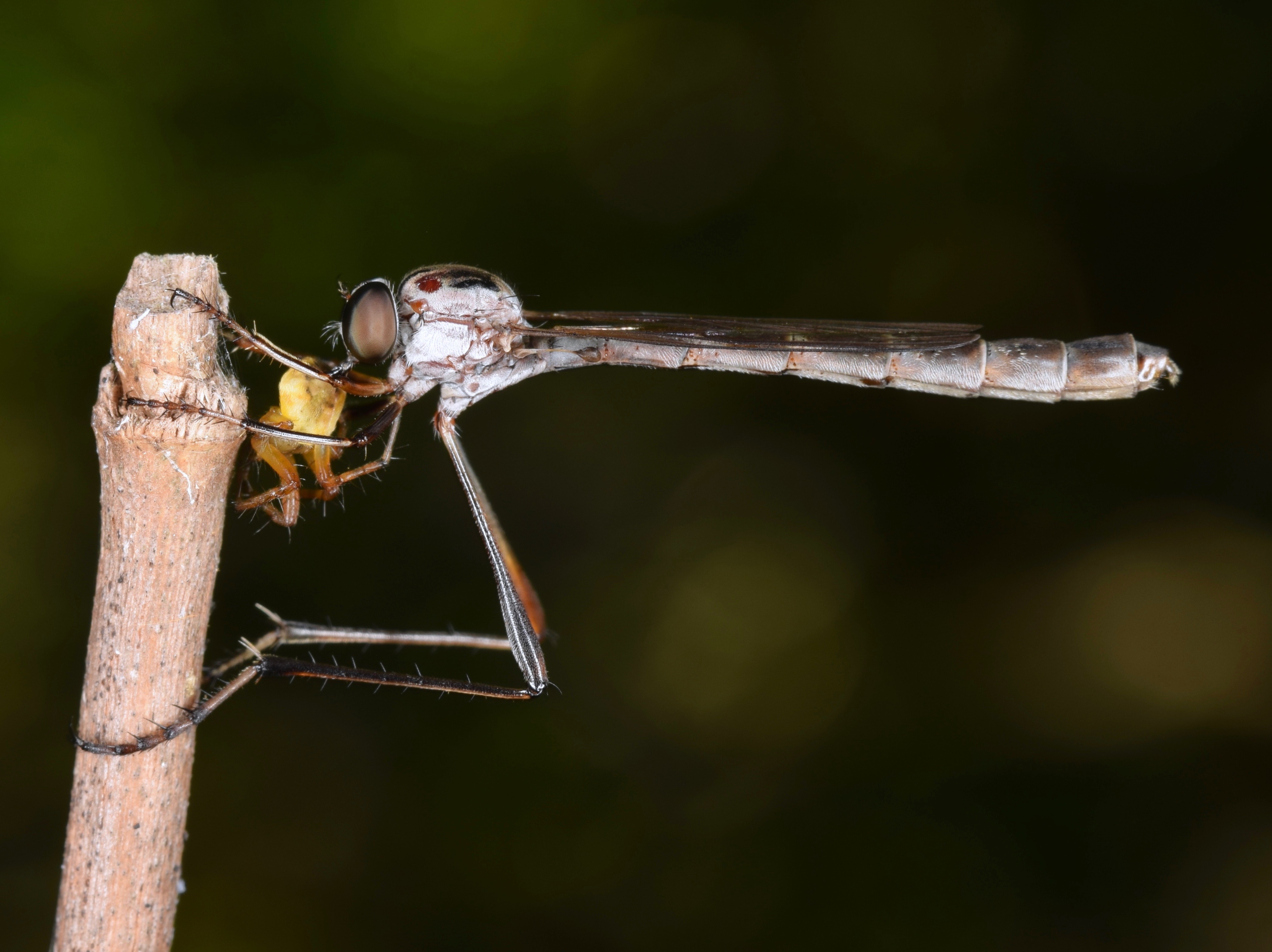

Scientific classification
- Domain: Eukaryota
- Kingdom: Animalia
- Phylum: Arthropoda
- Class: Insecta
- Order: Diptera
- Family: Asilidae
- Genus: Apachekolos
- Species: A. tenuipes

Binomial name
- Apachekolos tenuipes (Loew, 1862)

Synonyms
- Leptogaster tenuipes Loew, 1862

= Apachekolos tenuipes =

Species of fly

Apachekolos tenuipes is a species of robber flies in the family Asilidae.
