= Ablautus vanduzeei =

Scientific classification
- Domain: Eukaryota
- Kingdom: Animalia
- Phylum: Arthropoda
- Class: Insecta
- Order: Diptera
- Family: Asilidae
- Genus: Ablautus
- Species: A. vanduzeei

Binomial name
- Ablautus vanduzeei Wilcox, 1935

Species of fly

Ablautus vanduzeei is a species of robber flies in the family Asilidae.
