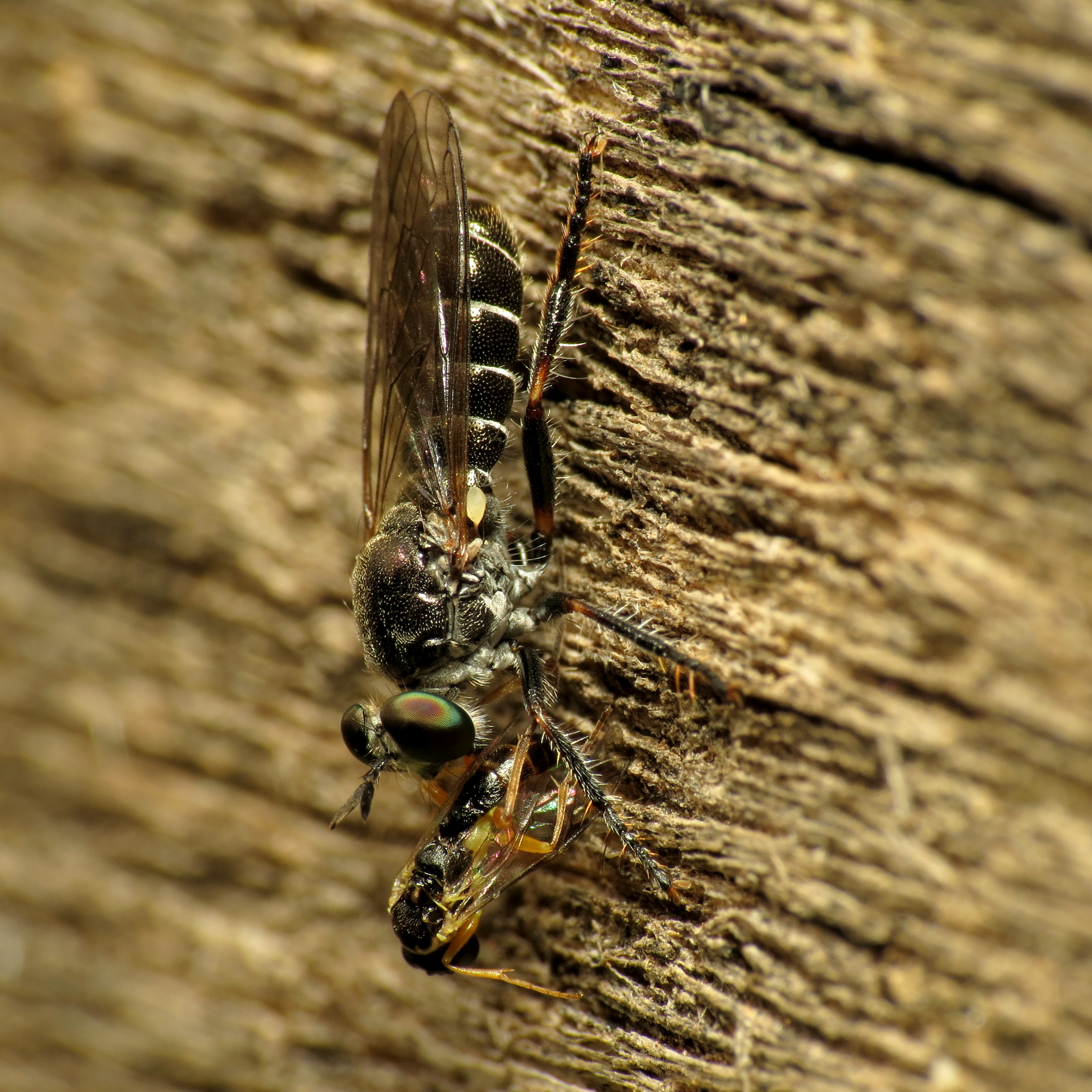

Scientific classification
- Domain: Eukaryota
- Kingdom: Animalia
- Phylum: Arthropoda
- Class: Insecta
- Order: Diptera
- Family: Asilidae
- Genus: Atomosia
- Species: A. puella

Binomial name
- Atomosia puella (Wiedemann, 1828)

Synonyms
- Laphria puella Wiedemann, 1828

= Atomosia puella =

Species of fly

Atomosia puella is a species of robber fly in the family Asilidae.
