= Andrenosoma albibarbe =

Scientific classification
- Kingdom: Animalia
- Phylum: Arthropoda
- Clade: Pancrustacea
- Class: Insecta
- Order: Diptera
- Family: Asilidae
- Genus: Andrenosoma
- Species: A. albibarbe

Binomial name
- Andrenosoma albibarbe (Meigen, 1820)

Species of fly

Andrenosoma albibarbe is a species of fly belonging to the family Asilidae.

It is native to Europe.
