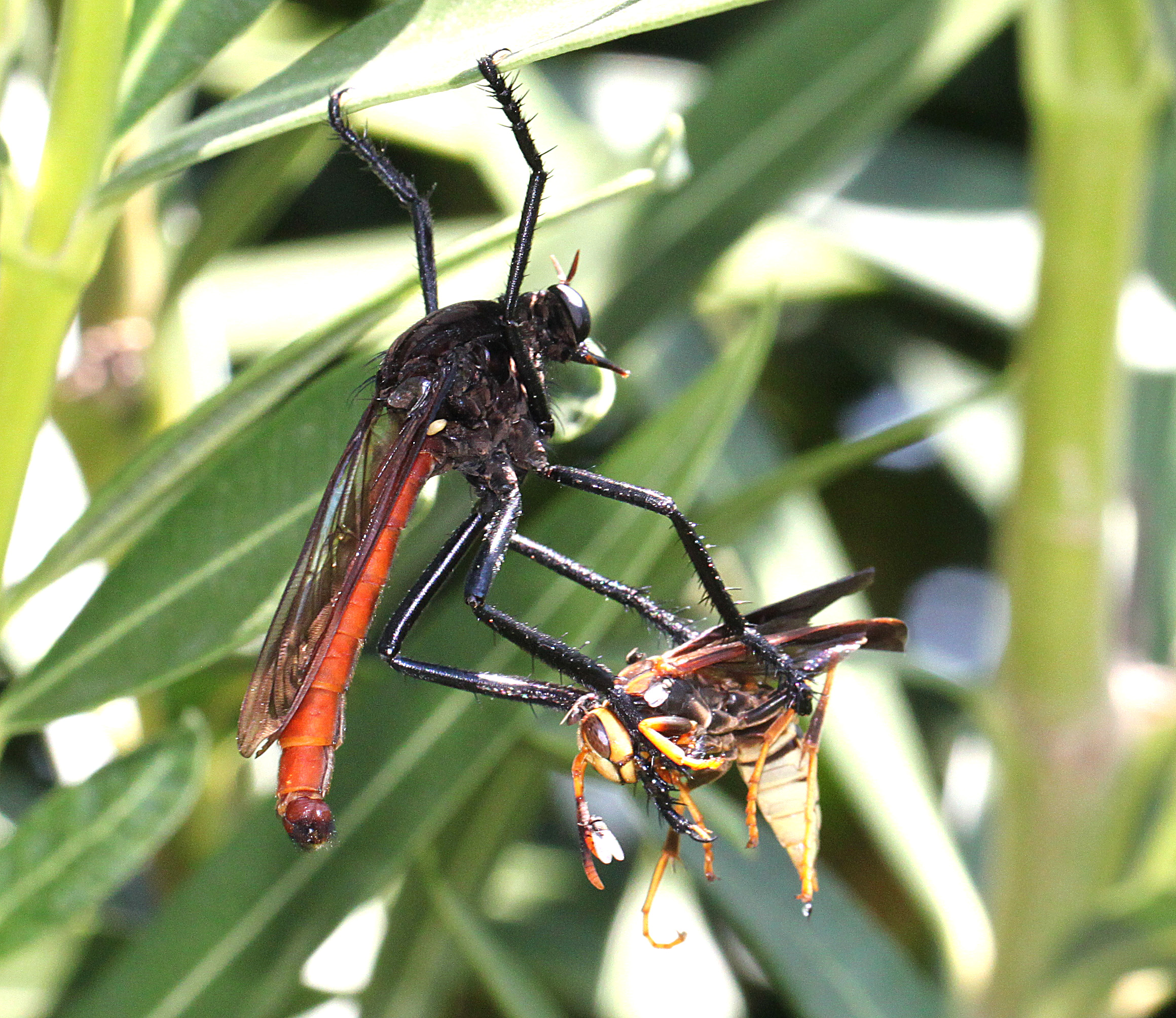

Scientific classification
- Kingdom: Animalia
- Phylum: Arthropoda
- Class: Insecta
- Order: Diptera
- Family: Asilidae
- Genus: Archilestris
- Species: A. magnificus

Binomial name
- Archilestris magnificus (Walker, 1854)

Synonyms
- Dasypogon magnificus Walker, 1854

= Archilestris magnificus =

Species of fly

Archilestris magnificus is a species of robber flies in the family Asilidae.
