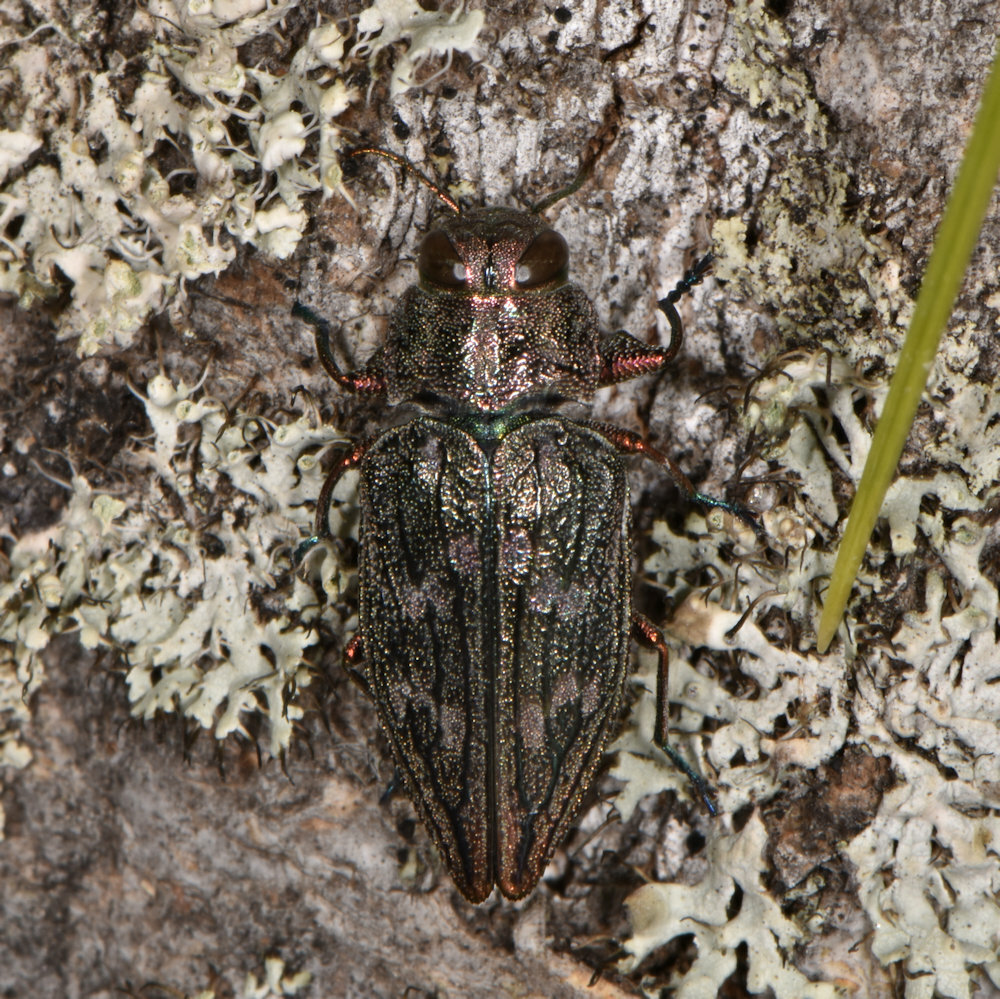
- Chrysobothris femorata, Michigan

Scientific classification
- Kingdom: Animalia
- Phylum: Arthropoda
- Clade: Pancrustacea
- Class: Insecta
- Order: Coleoptera
- Suborder: Polyphaga
- Infraorder: Elateriformia
- Family: Buprestidae
- Genus: Chrysobothris
- Species: C. femorata

Binomial name
- Chrysobothris femorata (Olivier, 1790)

= Chrysobothris femorata =

Species of beetle

Chrysobothris femorata, the flatheaded appletree borer, is a species of metallic wood-boring beetle in the family Buprestidae. It is found in Central America and North America.
