= Atoniomyia =

Scientific classification
- Domain: Eukaryota
- Kingdom: Animalia
- Phylum: Arthropoda
- Class: Insecta
- Order: Diptera
- Family: Asilidae
- Subfamily: Laphriinae
- Genus: Atoniomyia; Hermann, 1912

Genus of flies

Atoniomyia is a genus of robber flies in the family Asilidae.

== Species ==
- Atoniomyia albifacies (Hermann, 1912)
- Atoniomyia ancylocera (Schiner, 1868)
- Atoniomyia brevistylata (Williston, 1901)
- Atoniomyia duncani (Wilcox, 1937)
- Atoniomyia fulvipes Carrera, 1946
- Atoniomyia grossa Carrera, 1946
- Atoniomyia hispidella (Hermann, 1912)
- Atoniomyia laterepunctata (Hermann, 1912)
- Atoniomyia mikii (Williston, 1886)
- Atoniomyia mollis (Hermann, 1912)
- Atoniomyia pinguis (Hermann, 1912)
- Atoniomyia scalarata (Hermann, 1912)
- Atoniomyia setigera (Hermann, 1912)
- Atoniomyia viduata (Wiedemann, 1819)
