= Ablautus schlingeri =

Scientific classification
- Kingdom: Animalia
- Phylum: Arthropoda
- Clade: Pancrustacea
- Class: Insecta
- Order: Diptera
- Family: Asilidae
- Genus: Ablautus
- Species: A. schlingeri

Binomial name
- Ablautus schlingeri Wilcox, 1966

Species of fly

Ablautus schlingeri, the Oso Flaco robber fly, is a species of robber flies in the family Asilidae. It is found in California and may be threatened due to sand mining.
