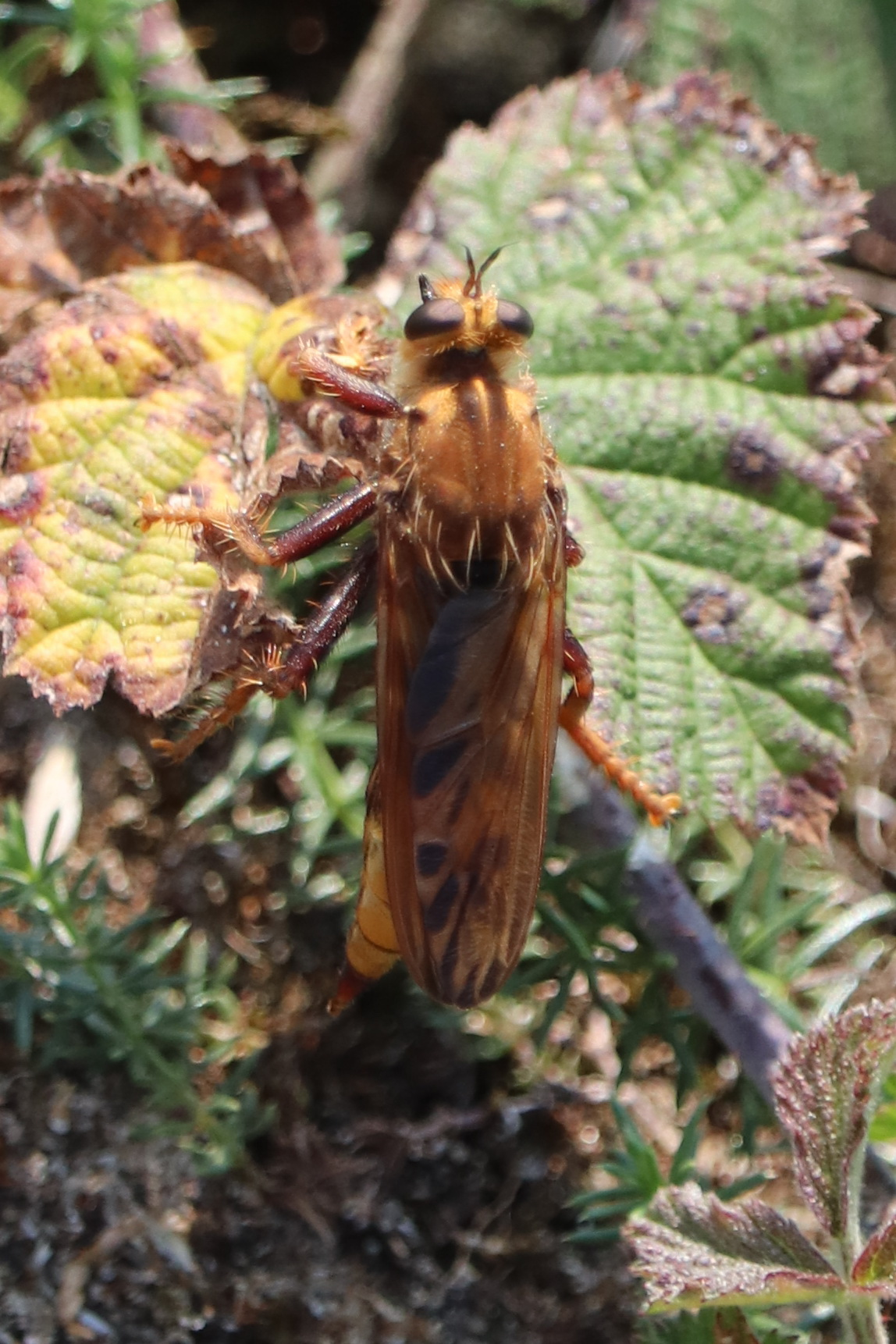

Scientific classification
- Kingdom: Animalia
- Phylum: Arthropoda
- Class: Insecta
- Order: Diptera
- Family: Asilidae
- Subfamily: Asilinae
- Genus: Asilus; Linnaeus, 1758

Type species
- Asilus crabroniformis Linnaeus, 1758

Diversity
- at least 210 species

= Asilus =

Genus of insects

Asilus is a genus of robber flies in the family Asilidae. There are at least 150 described species in Asilus.

== See also ==
- List of Asilus species
