= Andrenosoma =

- Andrenosoma atrum

Scientific classification
- Kingdom: Animalia
- Phylum: Arthropoda
- Clade: Pancrustacea
- Class: Insecta
- Order: Diptera
- Family: Asilidae
- Subfamily: Laphriinae
- Genus: Andrenosoma; Rondani, 1856

Genus of flies

Andrenosoma is a genus of robber flies in the family Asilidae. There are at least 70 described species in he genus Andrenosoma.

== Species ==
These 77 species belong to the genus Andrenosoma:

- Andrenosoma acunai Bromley, 1929^{c g}
- Andrenosoma albibarbe (Meigen, 1820)^{c g}
- Andrenosoma albolineatum (Macquart, 1850)^{c g}
- Andrenosoma albopilosum Villeneuve, 1911^{c g}
- Andrenosoma appendiculatum (Macquart, 1846)^{c g}
- Andrenosoma arachnoides (Bigot, 1878)^{c g}
- Andrenosoma aricenniae Farr, 1965^{c g}
- Andrenosoma atrum (Linnaeus, 1758)^{c g}
- Andrenosoma batesi Bromley, 1931^{c g}
- Andrenosoma bayardi Seguy, 1952^{c g}
- Andrenosoma biacuminaum García, Pérez & Portillo, 2017^{g}
- Andrenosoma boranicum Corti, 1895^{c g}
- Andrenosoma camposi Curran, 1931^{c g}
- Andrenosoma chalybeum Williston, 1885^{c g}
- Andrenosoma choprai Bromley, 1935^{c g}
- Andrenosoma cinctum (Bellardi, 1861)^{c}
- Andrenosoma cinereum (Bellardi, 1861)^{c g}
- Andrenosoma clauscicellum (Macquart, 1850)^{c g}
- Andrenosoma complexum Oldroyd, 1970^{c g}
- Andrenosoma corallium Martin, 1966^{i c g}
- Andrenosoma cornutum Oldroyd, 1972^{c g}
- Andrenosoma crassum Bromley, 1929^{c g}
- Andrenosoma cruentum (Mc Atee, 1919)^{i c g}
- Andrenosoma currani Bromley, 1931^{c g}
- Andrenosoma cyaniventre Bromley, 1934^{c g}
- Andrenosoma cyrtophora (Hermann, 1912)^{c g}
- Andrenosoma cyrtoxys Seguy, 1952^{c g}
- Andrenosoma dayi (Paramonov, 1958)^{c g}
- Andrenosoma elegans Bromley, 1934^{c g}
- Andrenosoma erax Bromley, 1934^{c g}
- Andrenosoma erythrogaster (Wiedemann, 1828)^{c g}
- Andrenosoma erythropyga (Wiedemann, 1828)^{c g}
- Andrenosoma flamipennis Bromley, 1931^{c g}
- Andrenosoma formidolosum (Walker, 1860)^{c g}
- Andrenosoma fulvicaudum (Say, 1823)^{i c g b}
- Andrenosoma funebris Artigas, Papavero & Pimentel, 1988^{c g}
- Andrenosoma heros Bromley, 1931^{c g}
- Andrenosoma hesperium Martin, 1966^{i c g b}
- Andrenosoma igneum Bromley, 1929^{i c g b}
- Andrenosoma irigense Oldroyd, 1972^{c g}
- Andrenosoma jenisi Kovar & Hradsky, 1996^{c g}
- Andrenosoma leucogenus Seguy, 1952^{c g}
- Andrenosoma lewisi Farr, 1965^{c g}
- Andrenosoma lupus Bromley, 1931^{c g}
- Andrenosoma mesoxanthum (Wiedemann, 1828)^{c g}
- Andrenosoma minos Bromley, 1931^{c g}
- Andrenosoma modestum (Paramonov, 1958)^{c g}
- Andrenosoma nigrum Bromley, 1931^{c g}
- Andrenosoma olbus (Walker, 1849)^{c g}
- Andrenosoma phoenicogaster (Hermann, 1912)^{c g}
- Andrenosoma punctatum Bromley, 1934^{c g}
- Andrenosoma purpurascens (Walker, 1856)^{c g}
- Andrenosoma pusillum Hermann, 1906^{c g}
- Andrenosoma pygophora Schiner, 1868^{c g}
- Andrenosoma pyrrhopyga (Wiedemann, 1828)^{c g}
- Andrenosoma quadrimaculatum Bromley, 1929^{c g}
- Andrenosoma queenslandi (Ricardo, 1918)^{c g}
- Andrenosoma rubidum Williston, 1901^{c g}
- Andrenosoma rubidapex (Hermann, 1912)^{c g}
- Andrenosoma rubidum (Williston, 1901)^{i}
- Andrenosoma rufipenne (Wiedemann, 1828)^{c g}
- Andrenosoma rufiventre (Blanchard, 1852)^{c g}
- Andrenosoma rufum Bromley, 1931^{c g}
- Andrenosoma sarcophaga (Hermann, 1912)^{c g}
- Andrenosoma serratum Hermann, 1906^{c g}
- Andrenosoma sexpunctatum (Williston, 1901)^{c g}
- Andrenosoma sicarium (Mc Atee, 1919)^{i c g}
- Andrenosoma subheros Bromley, 1931^{c g}
- Andrenosoma tectamum (Walker, 1849)^{c g}
- Andrenosoma trigoniferum Hermann, 1906^{c g}
- Andrenosoma valentinae Richter, 1985^{c g}
- Andrenosoma varipes (Banks, 1920)^{c g}
- Andrenosoma violaceum (Fabricius, 1781)^{c g}
- Andrenosoma xanthocnema (Wiedemann, 1828)^{c g}
- Andrenosoma zanutoi Artigas, Papavero & Pimentel, 1988^{c g}

Data sources: i = ITIS, c = Catalogue of Life, g = GBIF, b = Bugguide.net
