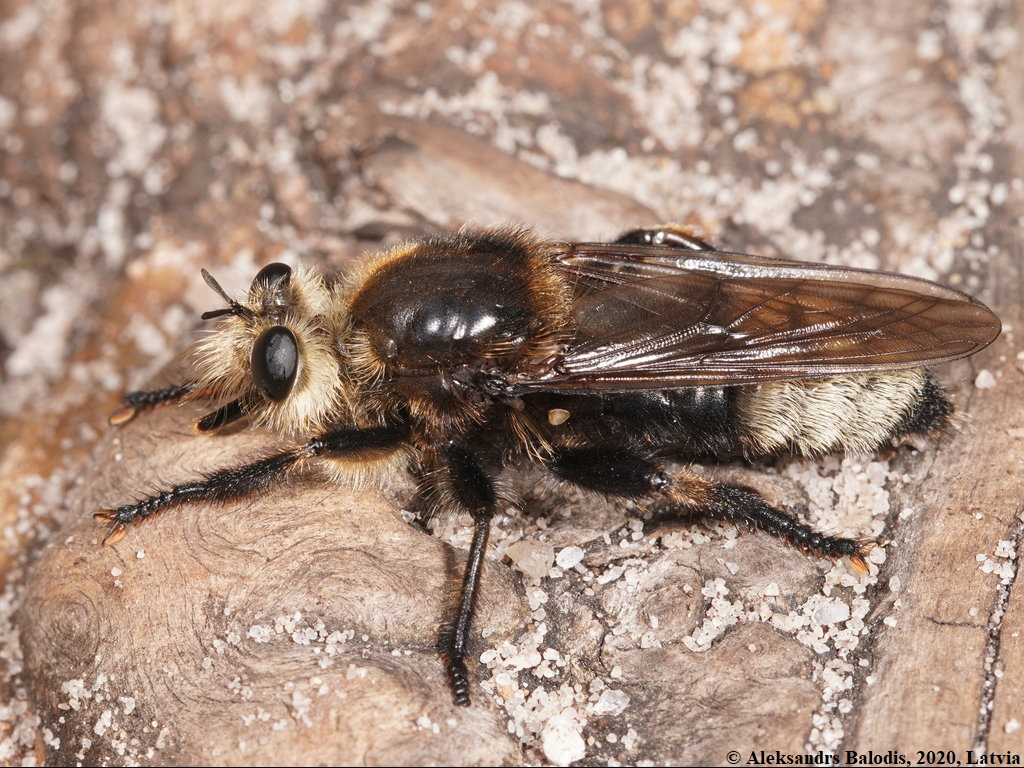

Scientific classification
- Kingdom: Animalia
- Phylum: Arthropoda
- Class: Insecta
- Order: Diptera
- Family: Asilidae
- Genus: Laphria
- Species: L. gibbosa

Binomial name
- Laphria gibbosa (Linnaeus, 1758)

Synonyms
- Asilus gibbosus Linnaeus, 1758; Asilus bombylius De Geer, 1776; Asilus leucurus Wiedemann, 1818

= Laphria gibbosa =

Species of insect

Laphria gibbosa is a species of fly belonging to the family Asilidae.

== Distribution ==
Europe.
