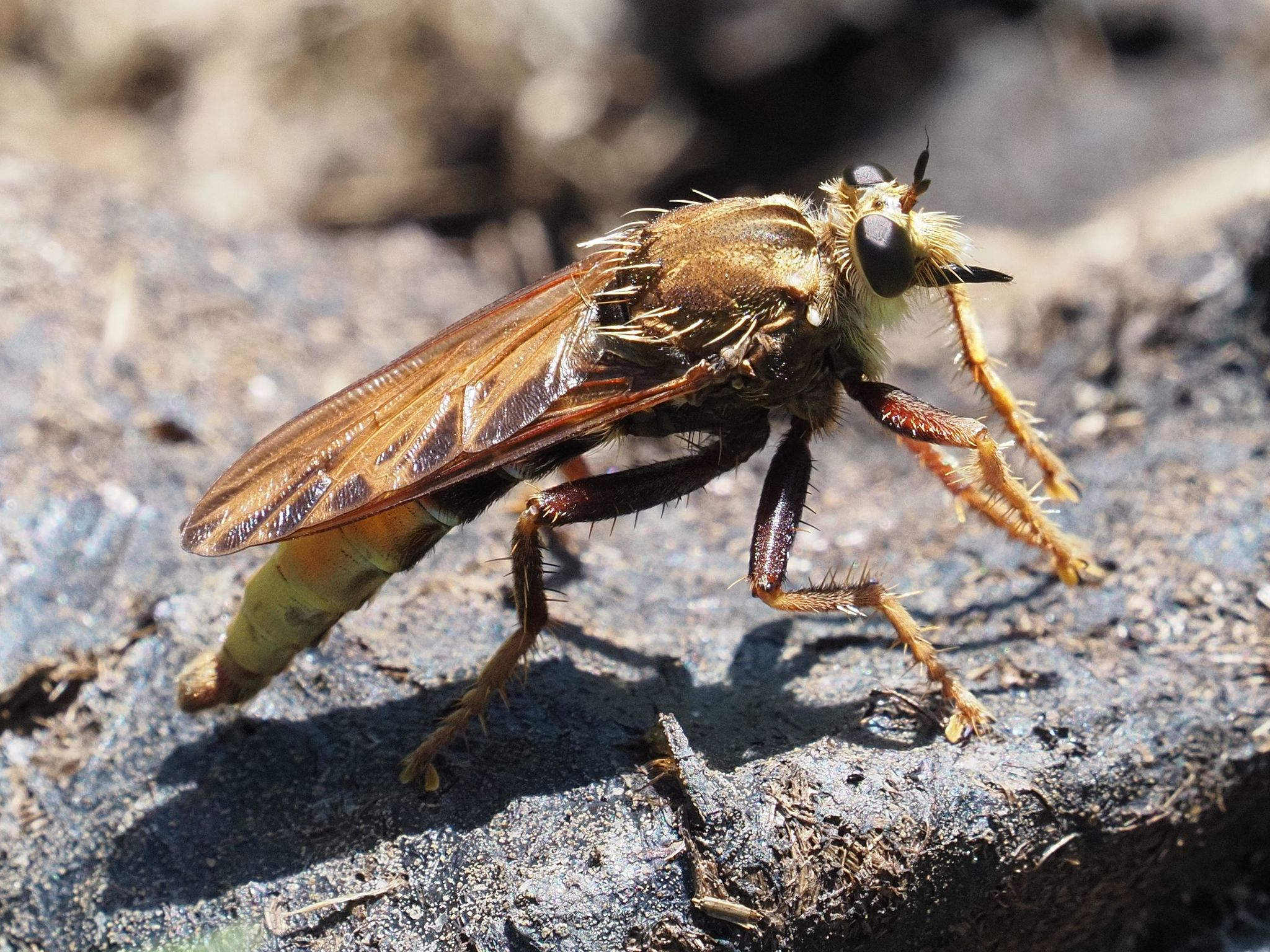

Scientific classification
- Kingdom: Animalia
- Phylum: Arthropoda
- Clade: Pancrustacea
- Class: Insecta
- Order: Diptera
- Family: Asilidae
- Genus: Asilus
- Species: A. crabroniformis

Binomial name
- Asilus crabroniformis Linnaeus, 1758

= Hornet robberfly =

Species of fly

The hornet robberfly, Asilus crabroniformis, is a species of predatory insect in the family Asilidae.

Reaching more than 25 mm in body length, it is one of the largest flies in the United Kingdom and feeds on grasshoppers, dung beetles and other flies.

== Description ==
The hornet robberfly is a large (20 to 25 mm), brightly coloured black and yellow fly, with yellowish wings that are smoky at the tip and along the hind border. The postoccipital bristles not proclinate. The facial lobe is not bare and shining. Third antenna! segment drawn out into an arista. Mesopleuron without bristles. The marginal wing cell is closed; veins R 1 and R 2+3 meet, and proceed as one vein to the wing margin. Male genitalia not boat-shaped, but with paired forceps. The abdomen has discal bristles on other segments besides first. The first three abdominal segments are black, the rest bright yellow. The legs are yellow, with more or less dusky femora. As the name suggests, it is hornet-like.

Unlike an actual hornet, the robberfly only has one yellow patch on its abdomen and one pair of wings. The larvae are believed to feed on dung beetle larvae and other detritivores.

Asilus crabroniformis can be found in woodland clearings and well-drained areas of heaths and downs covering Southern England and South & West Wales. It is reliant on the availability of rabbit or cattle dung.

It is a member of the robberfly family Asilidae, subfamily Asilinae and is included in the list of endangered species in the British Isles.
