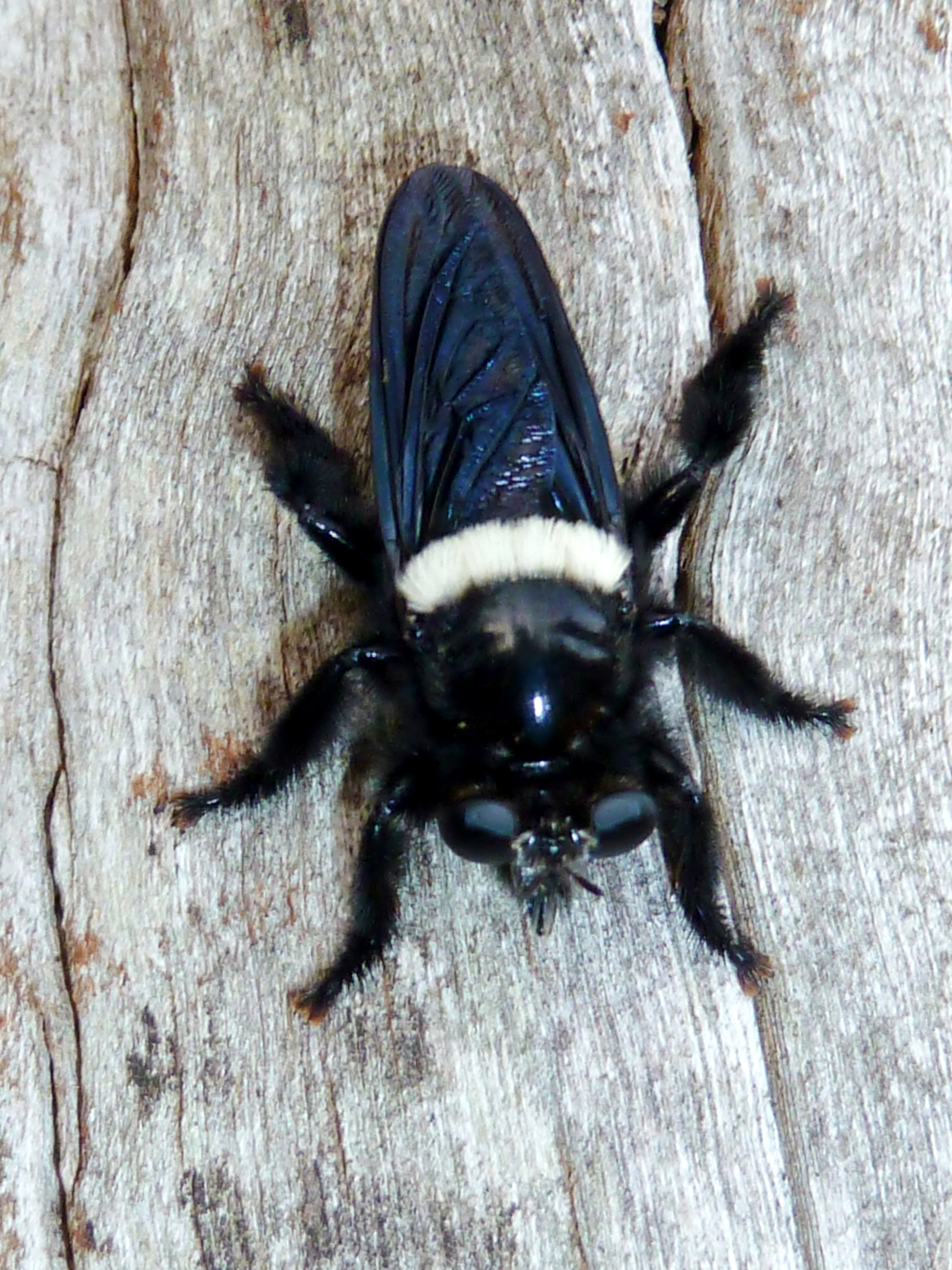
- Hyperechia marshalli

Scientific classification
- Kingdom: Animalia
- Phylum: Arthropoda
- Class: Insecta
- Order: Diptera
- Family: Asilidae
- Subfamily: Laphriinae

= Laphriinae =

Subfamily of flies

Laphriinae is a subfamily of robber flies in the family Asilidae. There are more than 110 genera and 1,000 described species in Laphriinae. Many are mimics of syntopic bees. Some prey on bees as adults. Larvae of the genus Hyperechia are known to grow inside the cells of Xylocopa bees, feeding on their larvae.

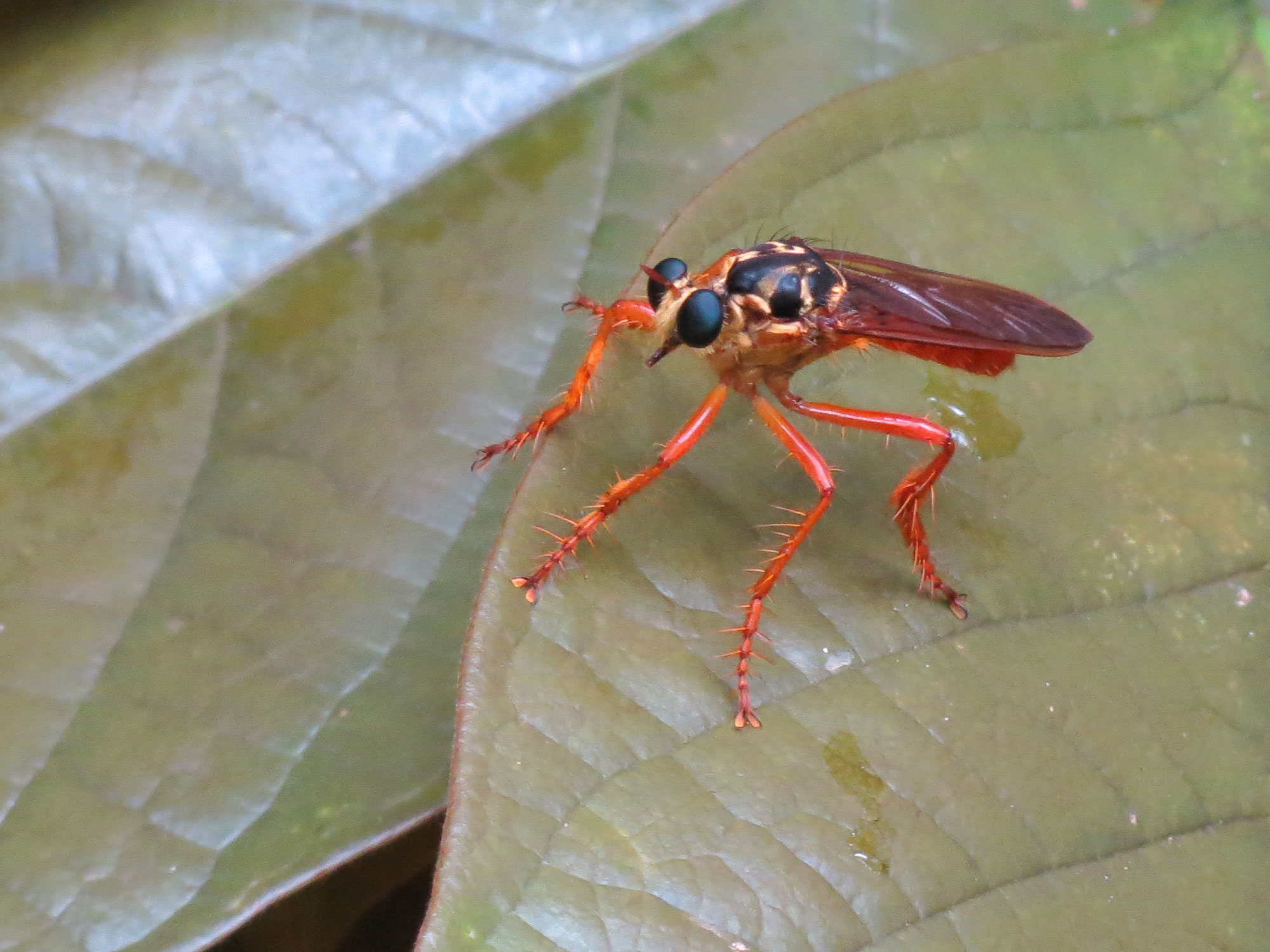
Smeryngolaphria numitor

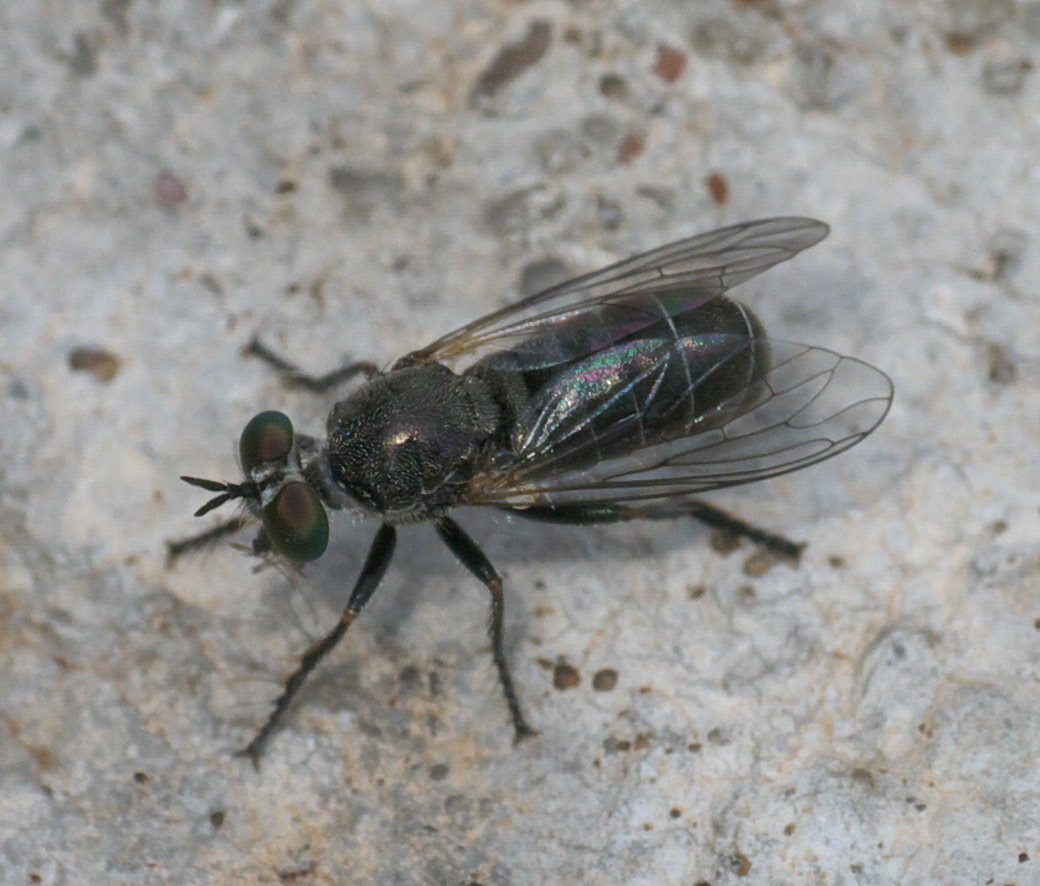
Atomosia melanopogon

== Laphriinae genera ==
Genera in the subfamily include:

- Acrochordomerus Hermann, 1920
- Adelodus Hermann, 1912
- Afromelittodes Oldroyd and Bruggen, 1963
- Afromosia Londt, 2015
- Amathomyia Hermann, 1912
- Andrenosoma Rondani, 1856
- Anoplothyrea Meijere, 1914
- Anypodetus Hermann, 1908
- Aphestia Schiner, 1866
- Aphistina Oldroyd, 1972
- Aphractia Artigas and Papavero and Serra, 1991
- Apoxyria Schiner, 1866
- Atomosia Macquart, 1838
- Atoniomyia Hermann, 1912
- Atractia Macquart, 1838
- Bathropsis Hermann, 1912
- Borapisma Hull, 1957
- Bromotheres Hull, 1962
- Cenochromyia Hermann, 1912
- Cerotainia Schiner, 1868
- Cerotainiops Curran, 1930
- Choerades Walker, 1851
- Chrysotriclis Artigas and Papavero and Costa, 1995
- Chymedax Hull, 1958
- Clariola Kertész, 1901
- Cochleariocera Artigas and Papavero and Costa, 1995
- Cormansis Walker, 1851
- Cryptomerinx Enderlein, 1914
- Ctenota Loew, 1873
- Cyanonedys Hermann, 1912
- Cymbipyga Artigas and Papavero and Costa, 1995
- Cyphomyiactia Artigas and Papavero and Serra, 1991
- Dasylechia Williston, 1907
- Dasyllina Bromley, 1935
- Dasyllis Loew, 1851
- Dasythrix Loew, 1851
- Despotiscus Bezzi, 1928
- Dichaetothyrea Meijere, 1914
- Dissmeryngodes Hermann, 1912
- Epaphroditus Hermann, 1912
- Ericomyia Londt, 2015
- Eumecosoma Schiner, 1866
- Gerrolasius Hermann, 1920
- Glyphotriclis Hermann, 1920
- Goneccalypsis Hermann, 1912
- Gymnotriclis Artigas and Papavero and Costa, 1995
- Helolaphyctis Hermann, 1920
- Hexameritia Speiser, 1920
- Hodites Hull, 1962
- Hoplistomerus Macquart, 1838
- Hoplotriclis Hermann, 1920
- Hybozelodes Hermann, 1912
- Hyperechia Schiner, 1866
- Ichneumolaphria Carrera, 1951
- Joartigasia Martinez and Martinez, 1974
- Katharma Oldroyd, 1959
- Katharmacercus Tomasovic, 2014
- Laloides Oldroyd, 1972
- Lampria Macquart, 1838
- Lamprozona Loew, 1851
- Lamyra Loew, 1851
- Laphria Meigen, 1803 (bee-like robber flies)
- Laphygmolestes Hull, 1962
- Laphyctis Loew, 1858
- Laphystia Loew, 1847
- Laphystotes Oldroyd, 1974
- Laxenecera Macquart, 1838
- Loewinella Hermann, 1912
- Lycosimyia Hull, 1958
- Macahyba Carrera, 1947
- Mactea Richter and Mamaev, 1976
- Maira Schiner, 1866
- Martinomyia Özdikmen, 2006
- Nannolaphria Londt, 1977
- Neophoneus Williston, 1889
- Notiolaphria Londt, 1977
- Nusa Walker, 1851
- Nyximyia Hull, 1962
- Oidardis Hermann, 1912
- Opeatocerus Hermann, 1912
- Opocapsis Hull, 1962
- Orthogonis Hermann, 1914
- Pagidolaphria Hermann, 1914
- Perasis Hermann, 1906
- Phellopteron Hull, 1962
- Pilica Curran, 1931
- Pilophoneus Londt, 1988
- Pogonosoma Rondani, 1856
- Proagonistes Loew, 1858
- Protometer Artigas and Papavero and Costa, 1995
- Prytanomyia Özdikmen, 2006
- Pseudonusa Joseph and Parui, 1989
- Psilocurus Loew, 1874
- Rhatimomyia Lynch Arribálzaga, 1882
- Rhopalogaster Macquart, 1834
- Scytomedes Röder, 1882
- Smeryngolaphria Hermann, 1912
- Stiphrolamyra Engel, 1928
- Storthyngomerus Hermann, 1919
- Strombocodia Hermann, 1912
- Systropalpus Hull, 1962
- Torebroma Hull, 1957
- Tricella Daniels, 1975
- Trichardis Hermann, 1906
- Trichardopsis Oldroyd, 1958
- Triclioscelis Roeder, 1900
- Triclis Loew, 1851
- Udenopogon Becker in Becker and Stein, 1913
- Zabrops Hull, 1957
- †Protoloewinella Schumann, 1984
