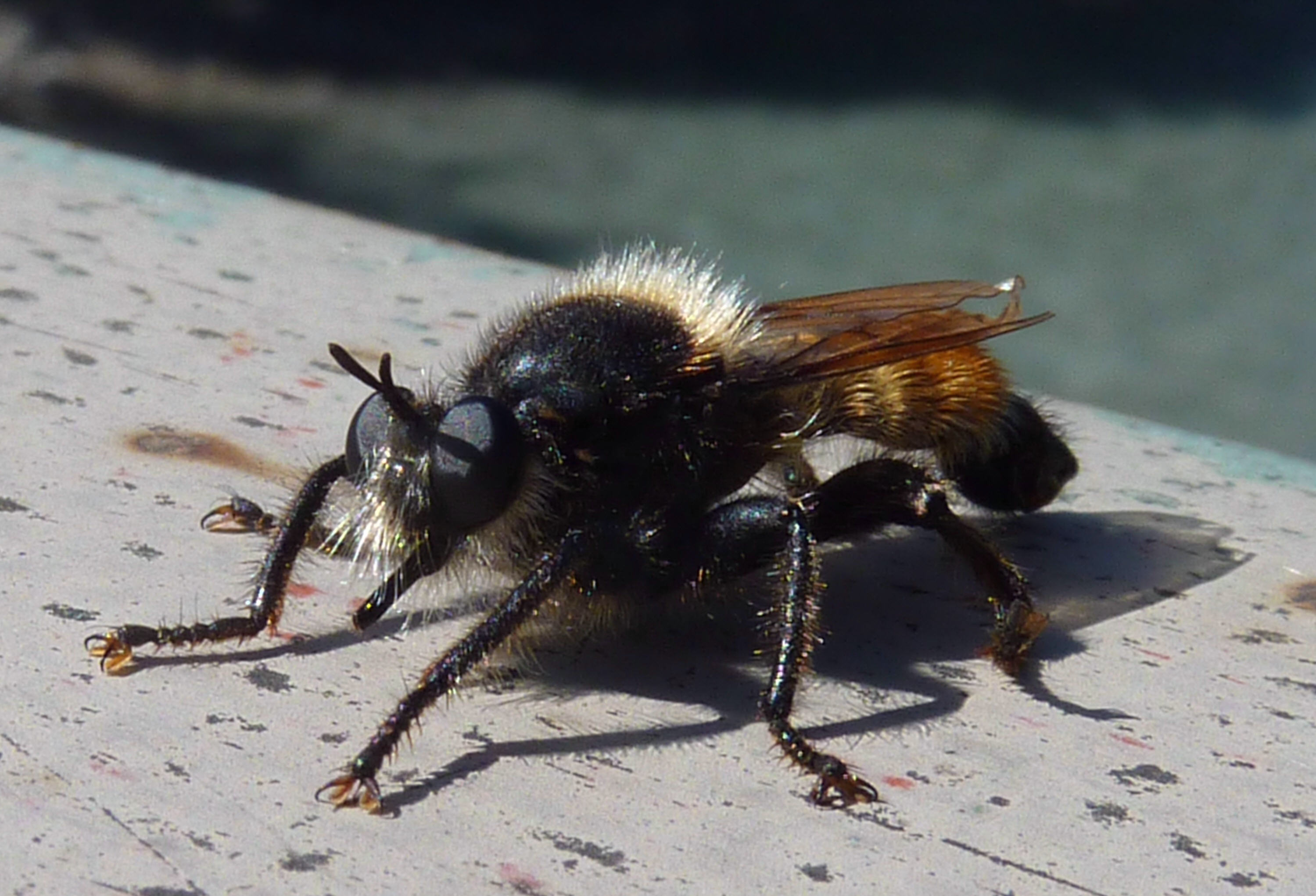
- Laphria flava

Scientific classification
- Kingdom: Animalia
- Phylum: Arthropoda
- Class: Insecta
- Order: Diptera
- Family: Asilidae
- Subfamily: Laphriinae
- Tribe: Laphriini

= Laphriini =

Tribe of flies

Laphriini is a tribe of robber flies in the family Asilidae. There are about 7 genera and at least 80 described species in Laphriini.

== Genera ==
These seven genera belong to the tribe Laphriini.

- Andrenosoma
- Cerotainiops
- Dasylechia
- Lampria
- Laphria (bee-like robber flies)
- Orthogonis
- Pogonosoma
