= C. fimbriata =

C. fimbriata may refer to:

- Caprinia fimbriata, a moth species
- Ceratocystis fimbriata, a fungus species
- Chelus fimbriata, the mata mata, a turtle species
- Choerades fimbriata, a robber fly species
- Chorizanthe fimbriata, a flowering plant species
- Cladonia fimbriata, a lichen species
- Coelogyne fimbriata, an orchid species
- Coracina fimbriata, the lesser cuckooshrike, a bird species
- Coralliophila fimbriata, a sea snail species
- Corythangela fimbriata, a moth species
- Crinia fimbriata, the Kimberley froglet, a frog species
- Cyclopsetta fimbriata, the spotfin flounder, a flatfish species
