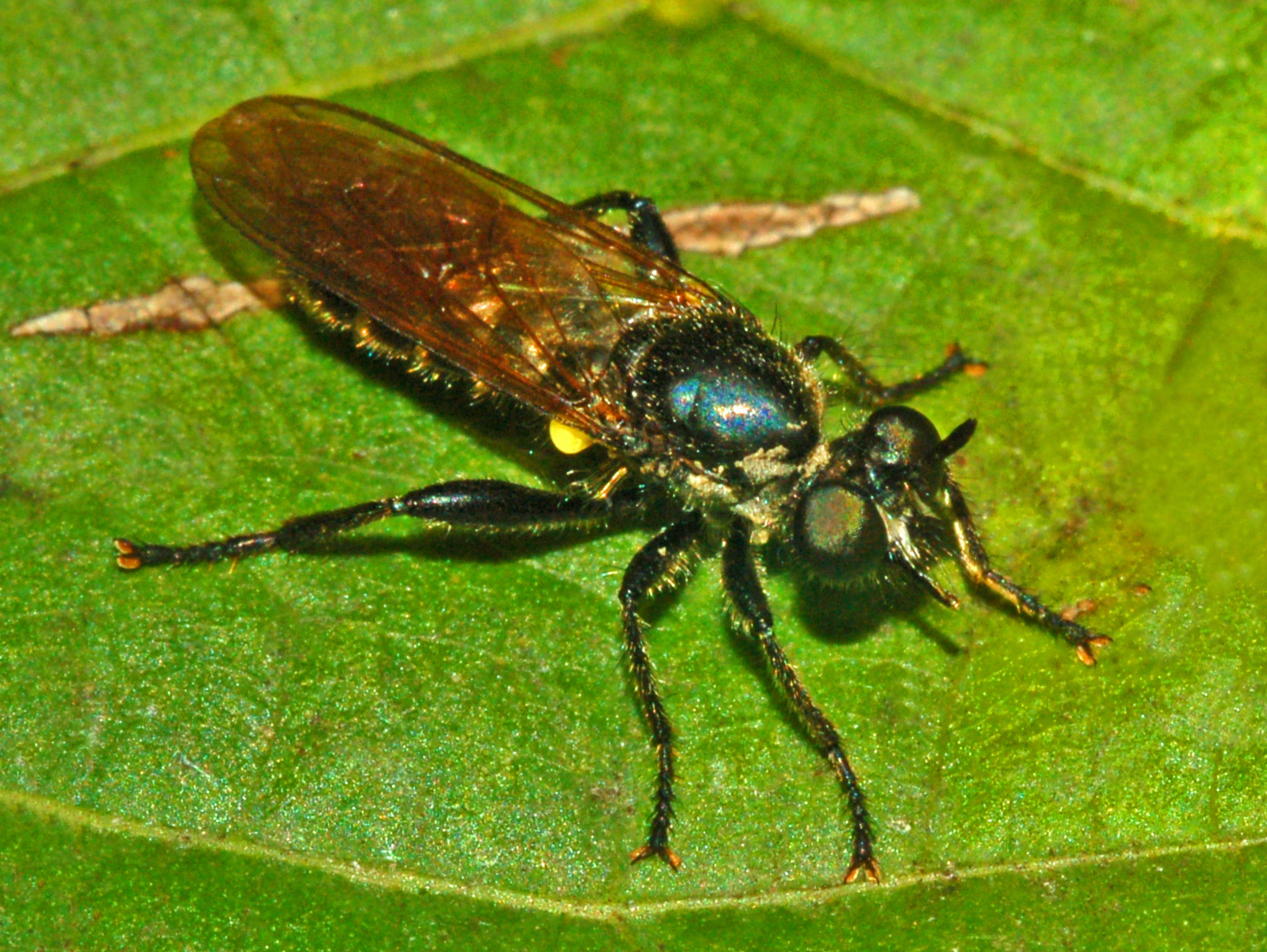

Scientific classification
- Kingdom: Animalia
- Phylum: Arthropoda
- Clade: Pancrustacea
- Class: Insecta
- Order: Diptera
- Family: Asilidae
- Genus: Choerades
- Species: C. marginata

Binomial name
- Choerades marginata (Linnaeus, 1758)

Synonyms
- Asilus marginatus Linnaeus, 1758

= Choerades marginata =

Species of fly

Choerades marginata is a species of robber fly (Asilidae: Laphriinae) found in Europe.

== Distribution and habitat ==
This species is present in most of Europe (Albania, Austria, Belgium, British Islands, European Russia, Czech Republic, Denmark, Finland, France, Germany, Hungary, Italy, Norway, Poland, Romania, Slovakia, Sweden, Switzerland, The Netherlands and former Yugoslavia). These robber flies mainly inhabit spruce and beech forest and hedge rows.

== Description ==
Choerades marginata can reach a body length of about 9–15 mm (0.35–0.59 in) and a wings length of 6.5–8 mm (0.26–0.31 in). In males the first antennal segment is about 1.8 - 2.1 times as long as the second one, while in female is 3 times longer. The sides of thorax (pleura) and the humeral callus are distinctly tomentose and scutum has only few, normal hairs. The lateral sclerites (mesopleuron) have a greyish-brown tomentum, with sparse yellow and black hairs all over. Tergites and legs are entirely black. In males the face usually shows yellow hairs above the facial gibbosity, tergites have yellow hair at the sides and the last tergite has a straight, hind margin.

== Biology ==
Adults can be found from May to September. They prey on other flies.
