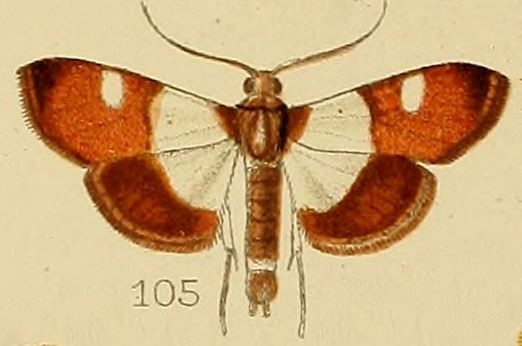

Scientific classification
- Kingdom: Animalia
- Phylum: Arthropoda
- Class: Insecta
- Order: Lepidoptera
- Family: Crambidae
- Tribe: Margaroniini
- Genus: Caprinia; Walker, 1859

Synonyms
- Caprina Lederer, 1863

= Caprinia =

Genus of moths

Caprinia is a genus of moths of the family Crambidae.

== Species ==
- Caprinia castanealis Kenrick, 1907
- Caprinia conglobatalis (Walker, 1865)
- Caprinia cuprescens Hampson, 1912
- Caprinia felderi Lederer, 1863
- Caprinia fimbriata (E. Hering, 1903)
- Caprinia intermedia Warren, 1896
- Caprinia marginata Janse, 1924
- Caprinia periusalis Walker, 1859
- Caprinia trichotarsia Hampson, 1912
- Caprinia unicoloralis (Kenrick, 1907)
- Caprinia versicolor (Pagenstecher, 1900)
