= Cerotainiops wilcoxi =

Scientific classification
- Domain: Eukaryota
- Kingdom: Animalia
- Phylum: Arthropoda
- Class: Insecta
- Order: Diptera
- Family: Asilidae
- Genus: Cerotainiops
- Species: C. wilcoxi

Binomial name
- Cerotainiops wilcoxi Pritchard, 1942

Synonyms
- Cerotainiops pritchardi Hull, 1960

Species of fly

Cerotainiops wilcoxi is a species of robber fly in the family Asilidae.
