= Cerotainiops abdominalis =

Scientific classification
- Kingdom: Animalia
- Phylum: Arthropoda
- Class: Insecta
- Order: Diptera
- Family: Asilidae
- Genus: Cerotainiops
- Species: C. abdominalis

Binomial name
- Cerotainiops abdominalis (Brown, 1897)

Synonyms
- Cerotainiops rufiventris Curran, 1930; Nusa abdominalis Brown, 1897; Nusa atripes McAtee, 1919; Nusa similis Brown, 1897

Species of fly

Cerotainiops abdominalis is a species of robber flies in the family Asilidae. The species is known to prefer to prey upon Pogonomyrmex ants, but, when temperatures are high, they will prey upon beetles, such as Collops limbellus.
