= Caprinia felderi =

Scientific classification
- Kingdom: Animalia
- Phylum: Arthropoda
- Class: Insecta
- Order: Lepidoptera
- Family: Crambidae
- Genus: Caprinia
- Species: C. felderi

Binomial name
- Caprinia felderi Lederer, 1863

Species of moth

Caprinia felderi is a moth in the family Crambidae. It was described by Julius Lederer in 1863. It is found in India (Assam), on Java and Ambon Island, as well as in Australia, where it has been recorded from Queensland.
