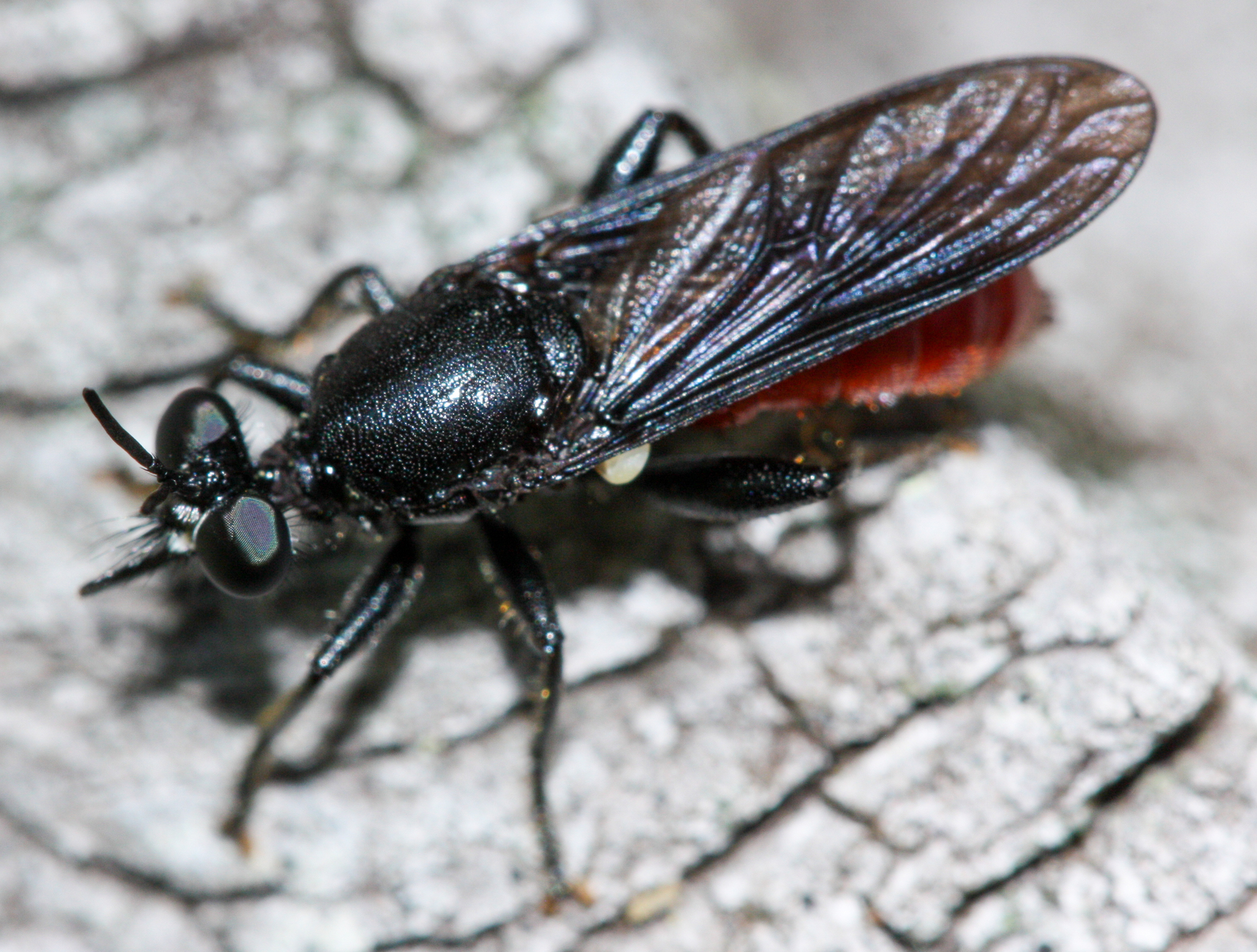
- Lampria bicolor, New Jersey

Scientific classification
- Domain: Eukaryota
- Kingdom: Animalia
- Phylum: Arthropoda
- Class: Insecta
- Order: Diptera
- Family: Asilidae
- Genus: Lampria
- Species: L. bicolor

Binomial name
- Lampria bicolor (Wiedemann, 1828)

Synonyms
- Laphria antaea Walker, 1849; Laphria bicolor Wiedemann, 1828; Laphria megacera Macquart, 1834; Laphria saniosa Say, 1829

= Lampria bicolor =

Species of fly

Lampria bicolor is a species of robber flies in the family Asilidae. It is found mainly in the United States east of the Rocky Mountains, but has also been reported in South America.
