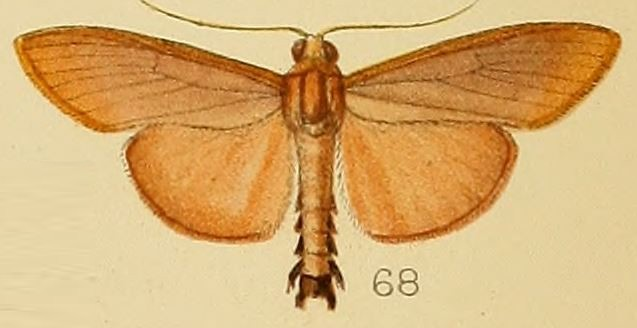

Scientific classification
- Kingdom: Animalia
- Phylum: Arthropoda
- Class: Insecta
- Order: Lepidoptera
- Family: Crambidae
- Genus: Caprinia
- Species: C. unicoloralis

Binomial name
- Caprinia unicoloralis (Kenrick, 1907)

Synonyms
- Dracaenura unicoloralis Kenrick, 1907

= Caprinia unicoloralis =

Species of moth

Caprinia unicoloralis is a species of moth of the family Crambidae. It was described by George Hamilton Kenrick in 1907 and it is found in Papua New Guinea.

It has a wingspan of 36 mm.
