= Psilocurus puellus =

Scientific classification
- Domain: Eukaryota
- Kingdom: Animalia
- Phylum: Arthropoda
- Class: Insecta
- Order: Diptera
- Family: Asilidae
- Genus: Psilocurus
- Species: P. puellus

Binomial name
- Psilocurus puellus Bromley, 1934

Species of fly

Psilocurus puellus is a species of robber fly in the family Asilidae.
