= Caprinia conglobatalis =

Scientific classification
- Kingdom: Animalia
- Phylum: Arthropoda
- Class: Insecta
- Order: Lepidoptera
- Family: Crambidae
- Genus: Caprinia
- Species: C. conglobatalis

Binomial name
- Caprinia conglobatalis (Walker, 1865)

Synonyms
- Botys conglobatalis Walker, 1865

Species of moth

Caprinia conglobatalis is a moth in the family Crambidae. It was described by Francis Walker in 1865. It is found on Flores in Indonesia.
