= Caprinia periusalis =

Scientific classification
- Kingdom: Animalia
- Phylum: Arthropoda
- Class: Insecta
- Order: Lepidoptera
- Family: Crambidae
- Genus: Caprinia
- Species: C. periusalis

Binomial name
- Caprinia periusalis Walker, 1859

Species of moth

Caprinia periusalis is a moth in the family Crambidae. It was described by Francis Walker in 1859. It is found in Venezuela.
