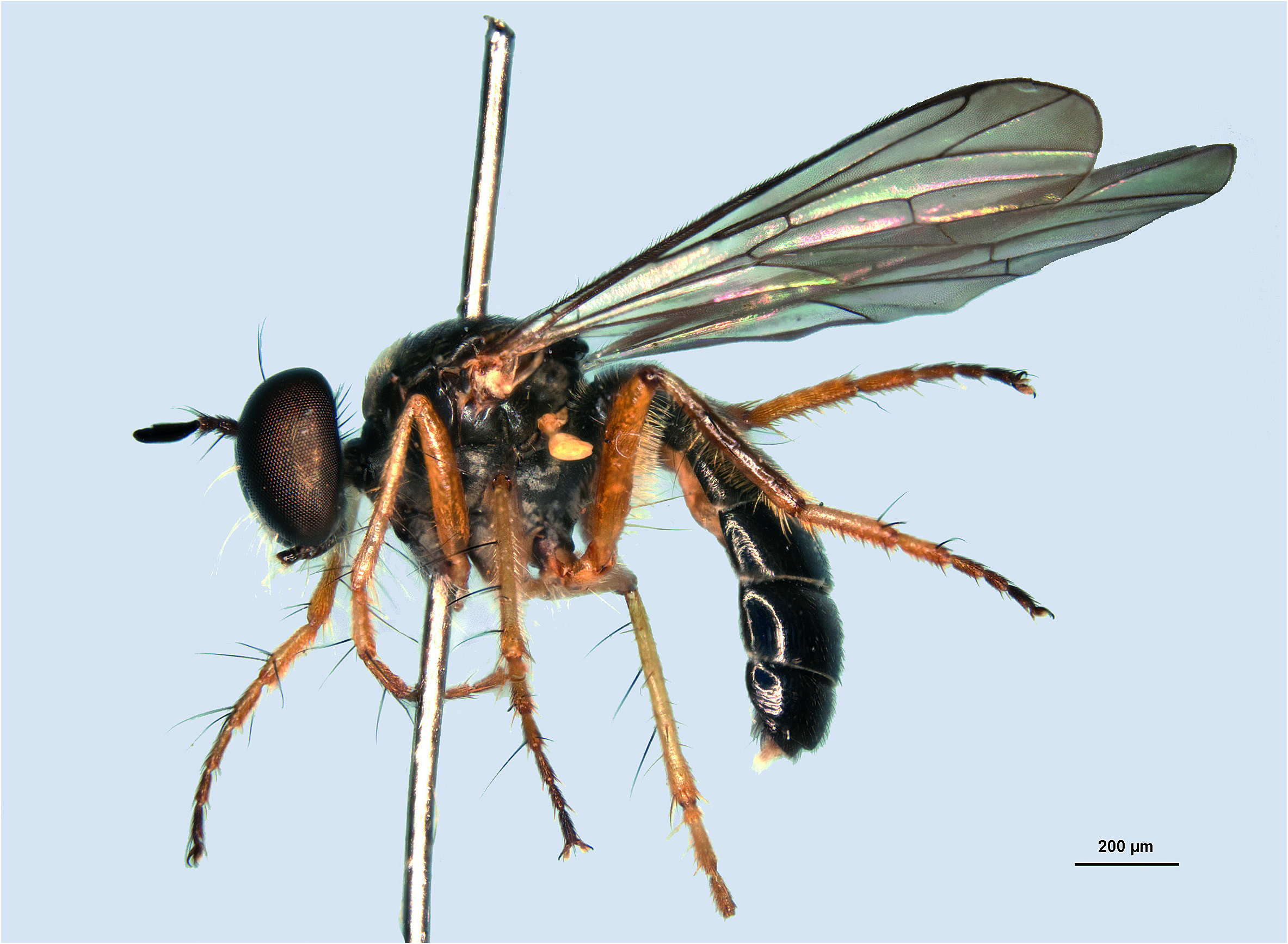

Scientific classification
- Domain: Eukaryota
- Kingdom: Animalia
- Phylum: Arthropoda
- Class: Insecta
- Order: Diptera
- Family: Asilidae
- Subfamily: Laphriinae
- Genus: Afromosia; Londt, 2015
- Species: A. barkemeyeri

Binomial name
- Afromosia barkemeyeri Londt, 2015

= Afromosia barkemeyeri =

Species of fly

Afromosia barkemeyeri is a species of robber fly (family Asilidae), the sole member of the genus Afromosia. The specific epithet honours Dr Werner Barkemeyer.
