= Lampria rubriventris =

Scientific classification
- Domain: Eukaryota
- Kingdom: Animalia
- Phylum: Arthropoda
- Class: Insecta
- Order: Diptera
- Family: Asilidae
- Genus: Lampria
- Species: L. rubriventris

Binomial name
- Lampria rubriventris (Macquart, 1834)

Synonyms
- Laphria rubriventris Macquart, 1834

Species of fly

Lampria rubriventris is a species of robber flies in the family Asilidae.
