= Zabrops flavipilis =

Scientific classification
- Domain: Eukaryota
- Kingdom: Animalia
- Phylum: Arthropoda
- Class: Insecta
- Order: Diptera
- Family: Asilidae
- Genus: Zabrops
- Species: Z. flavipilis

Binomial name
- Zabrops flavipilis (Jones, 1907)

Synonyms
- Triclis flavipilis Jones, 1907

Species of fly

Zabrops flavipilis is a species of robber fly in the family Asilidae.
