= Caprinia trichotarsia =

Scientific classification
- Kingdom: Animalia
- Phylum: Arthropoda
- Class: Insecta
- Order: Lepidoptera
- Family: Crambidae
- Genus: Caprinia
- Species: C. trichotarsia

Binomial name
- Caprinia trichotarsia Hampson, 1912

Species of moth

Caprinia trichotarsia is a moth in the family Crambidae. It was described by George Hampson in 1912. It is found in Papua New Guinea.
