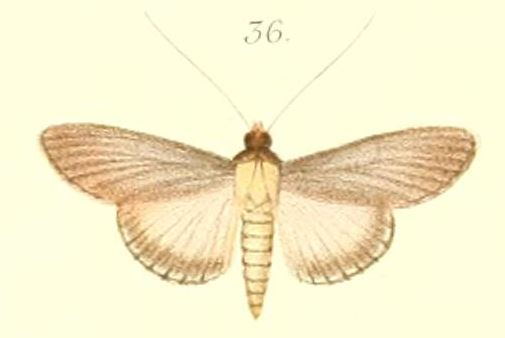

Scientific classification
- Kingdom: Animalia
- Phylum: Arthropoda
- Class: Insecta
- Order: Lepidoptera
- Family: Crambidae
- Genus: Caprinia
- Species: C. versicolor

Binomial name
- Caprinia versicolor (Pagenstecher, 1900)

Synonyms
- Dracaenura versicolor Pagenstecher, 1900

= Caprinia versicolor =

Species of moth

Caprinia versicolor is a species of moth of the family Crambidae. It was described by Arnold Pagenstecher in 1900 and it is found in Papua New Guinea.
