= Orthogonis stygia =

Scientific classification
- Domain: Eukaryota
- Kingdom: Animalia
- Phylum: Arthropoda
- Class: Insecta
- Order: Diptera
- Family: Asilidae
- Genus: Orthogonis
- Species: O. stygia

Binomial name
- Orthogonis stygia (Bromley, 1931)

Synonyms
- Laphria stygia Bromley, 1931

Species of fly

Orthogonis stygia is a species of robber flies (insects in the family Asilidae).
