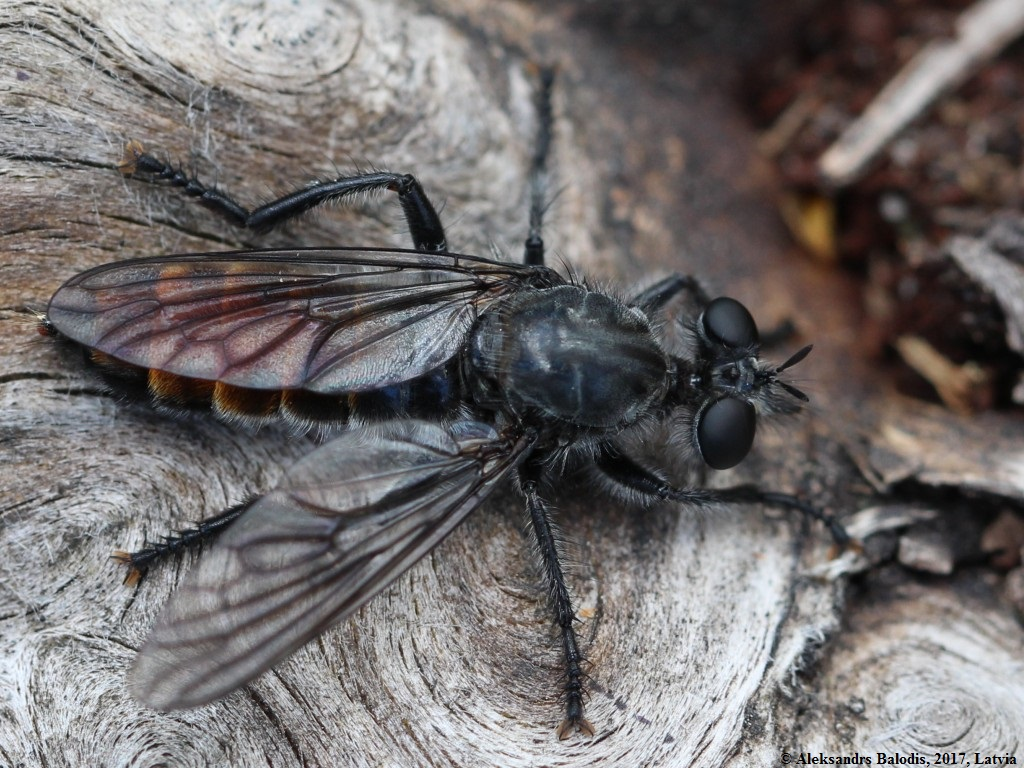
- Choerades gilvus Latvia
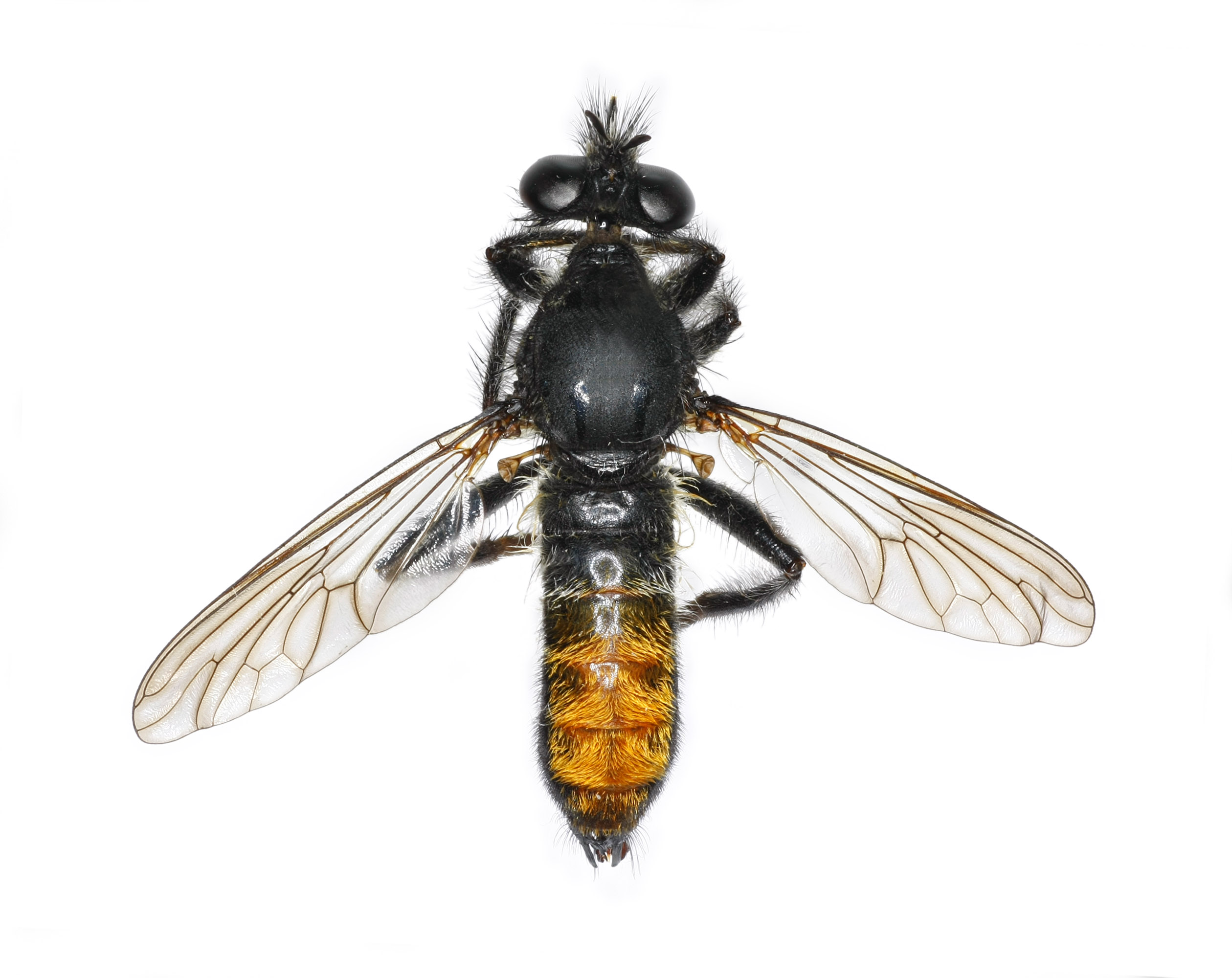

Scientific classification
- Kingdom: Animalia
- Phylum: Arthropoda
- Clade: Pancrustacea
- Class: Insecta
- Order: Diptera
- Family: Asilidae
- Genus: Choerades
- Species: C. gilvus

Binomial name
- Choerades gilvus (Linnaeus, 1758)

= Choerades gilvus =

Species of fly

Choerades gilvus is a Palearctic species of robber fly in the family Asilidae. It is a medium size asilid (15–18 mm) in length with distinctive largely black long golden or reddish hairs over orange on abdominal tergites 3–7 Difficult to distinguish from other Choerades. Wolff, Gebel and Geller-Grimm (2021), ( Majer (1997), van den Broek (1979), Stubbs and Drake (2001) all provide keys, descriptions and illustrations. Older works are also useful eg. Seguy (1920)
