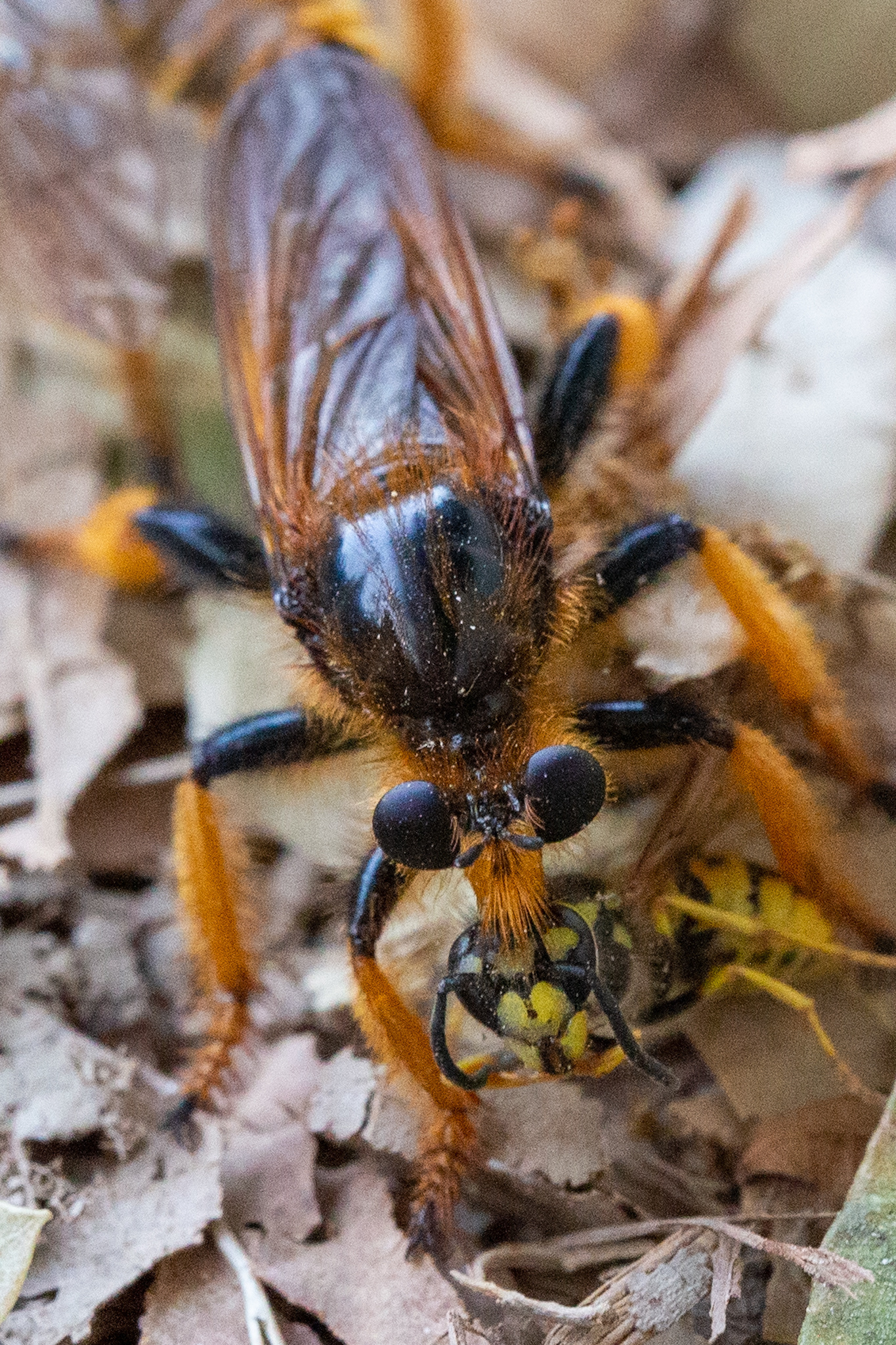

Scientific classification
- Domain: Eukaryota
- Kingdom: Animalia
- Phylum: Arthropoda
- Class: Insecta
- Order: Diptera
- Family: Asilidae
- Genus: Pogonosoma
- Species: P. maroccanum

Binomial name
- Pogonosoma maroccanum (Fabricius, 1794)

= Pogonosoma maroccanum =

Species of insect

Pogonosoma maroccanum is a species of fly from the genus Pogonosoma. The species was originally described by Johan Christian Fabricius in 1794.
