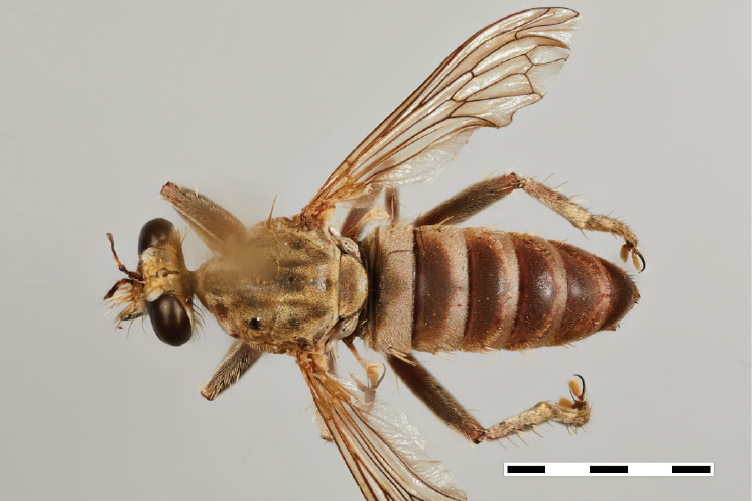
- Male L. argenteofasciata

Scientific classification
- Domain: Eukaryota
- Kingdom: Animalia
- Phylum: Arthropoda
- Class: Insecta
- Order: Diptera
- Family: Asilidae
- Subfamily: Laphriinae
- Genus: Laphyctis; Loew, 1858

Type species
- Laphyctis argenteofasciata (Engel, 1929)

= Laphyctis =

Genus of flies

Laphyctis is a genus of robberflies restricted to the Afrotropical region. In the past some members were placed in the genus Laphystia Loew, 1847. Laphyctis has an open R1 cell unlike Laphystia and has long dense macroseta on the distal margin of the male gonocoxite. Most species in the genus are found in dry sandy regions and are active in summer.

Species in the genus include:

- L. iota
- L. eremia
- L. gigantella
- L. orichalcea
- L. argenteofasciata
