= Caprinia intermedia =

Scientific classification
- Kingdom: Animalia
- Phylum: Arthropoda
- Class: Insecta
- Order: Lepidoptera
- Family: Crambidae
- Genus: Caprinia
- Species: C. intermedia

Binomial name
- Caprinia intermedia Warren, 1896

Species of moth

Caprinia intermedia is a moth in the family Crambidae. It was described by Warren in 1896. It is found in India (Khasia Hills).
