= Psilocurus nudiusculus =

Scientific classification
- Domain: Eukaryota
- Kingdom: Animalia
- Phylum: Arthropoda
- Class: Insecta
- Order: Diptera
- Family: Asilidae
- Genus: Psilocurus
- Species: P. nudiusculus

Binomial name
- Psilocurus nudiusculus Loew, 1874

Species of insect

Psilocurus nudiusculus is a species of robber fly in the family Asilidae.
