= Caprinia marginata =

Scientific classification
- Kingdom: Animalia
- Phylum: Arthropoda
- Class: Insecta
- Order: Lepidoptera
- Family: Crambidae
- Genus: Caprinia
- Species: C. marginata

Binomial name
- Caprinia marginata Janse, 1924

Species of moth

Caprinia marginata is a moth in the family Crambidae. It was described by Anthonie Johannes Theodorus Janse in 1924. It is found on Seram in Indonesia.
