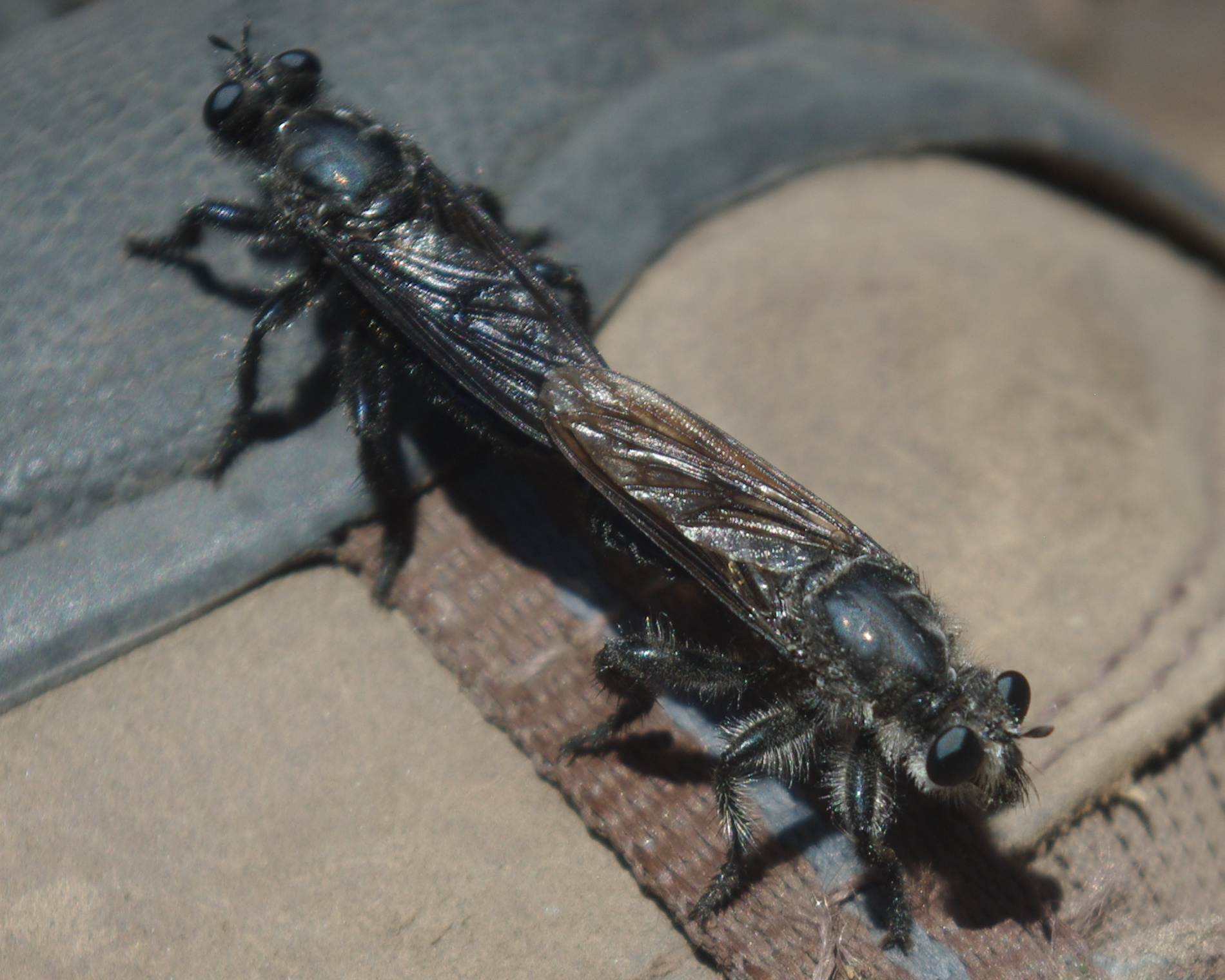

Scientific classification
- Domain: Eukaryota
- Kingdom: Animalia
- Phylum: Arthropoda
- Class: Insecta
- Order: Diptera
- Family: Asilidae
- Genus: Pogonosoma
- Species: P. ridingsi

Binomial name
- Pogonosoma ridingsi Cresson, 1920

Synonyms
- Pogonosoma stricklandi Adisoemarto, 1967

= Pogonosoma ridingsi =

Species of fly

Pogonosoma ridingsi is a species of robber flies (insects in the family Asilidae).
