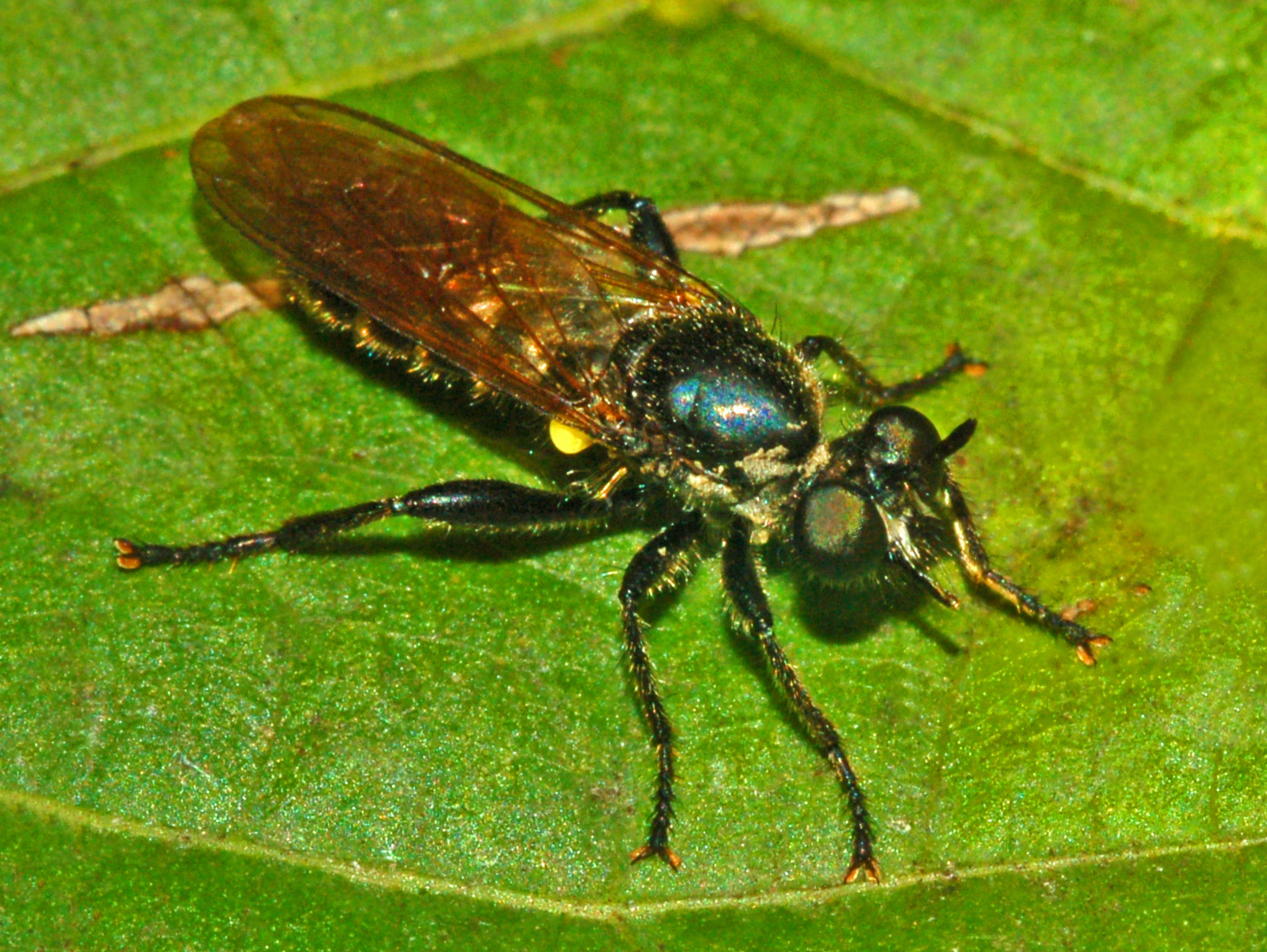
- Choerades marginata

Scientific classification
- Kingdom: Animalia
- Phylum: Arthropoda
- Class: Insecta
- Order: Diptera
- Family: Asilidae
- Subfamily: Laphriinae
- Genus: Choerades; Walker, 1851

= Choerades =

Genus of flies

Choerades sp. in copula

Choerades is a genus of robber flies described by Francis Walker in 1851, belonging to the family Asilidae, subfamily Laphriinae.

== Description ==
Genus Choerades is closely related to the genera Laphria and Bombomima. They can mainly be distinguished by genitalic differences in males, as the shape of the upper forceps or the evolution of lamellae from the fusion of bristles, but also for the length of hairs and bristles on the facial gibbosity. The adults' average sizes reach 10–20 millimetres (0.4–0.8 in). These robber flies are quite hairy, their body is usually black, while the bee-mimicking abdomen shows black and yellow stripes. They generally prey on insects of a variety of species, including flies, bees, wasps and beetles.

== Distribution ==
The species of this genus are distributed in most of Europe, the Eastern Palearctic realm, the Near East, and the Nearctic realm.

== Species ==
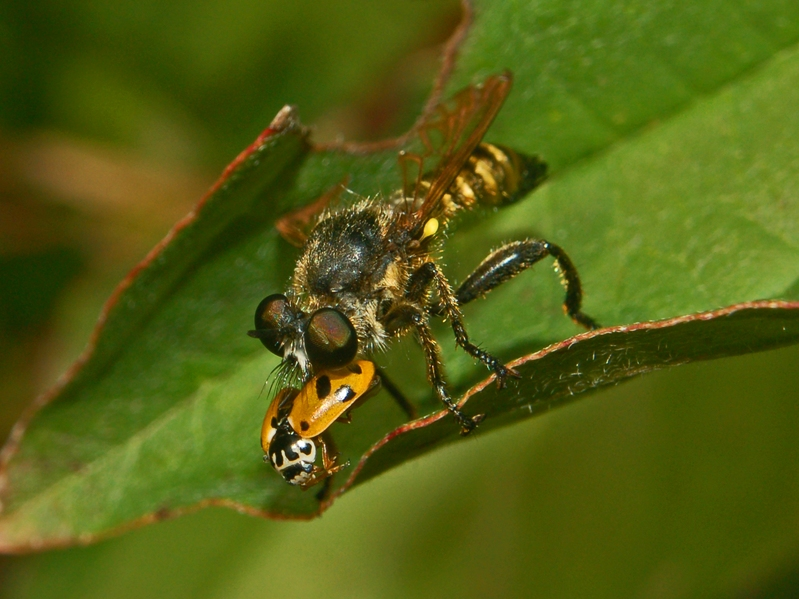
Choerades sp. preys a ladybug

- Choerades castellanii (Hradský, 1962)
- Choerades dioctriaeformis (Meigen, 1820)
- Choerades femorata (Meigen, 1804)
- Choerades fimbriata (Meigen, 1820)
- Choerades fortunata Baez & Weinberg, 1981
- Choerades fuliginosa (Panzer, 1798)
- Choerades fulva (Meigen, 1804)
- Choerades gilvus (Linnaeus, 1758)
- Choerades ignea (Meigen, 1820)
- Choerades lapponica (Zetterstedt, 1838)
- Choerades loewi (Lehr, 1992)
- Choerades marginata (Linnaeus, 1758)
- Choerades mouchai Hradský, 1985
- Choerades rufipes (Fallén, 1814)
- Choerades venatrix (Loew, 1847)
