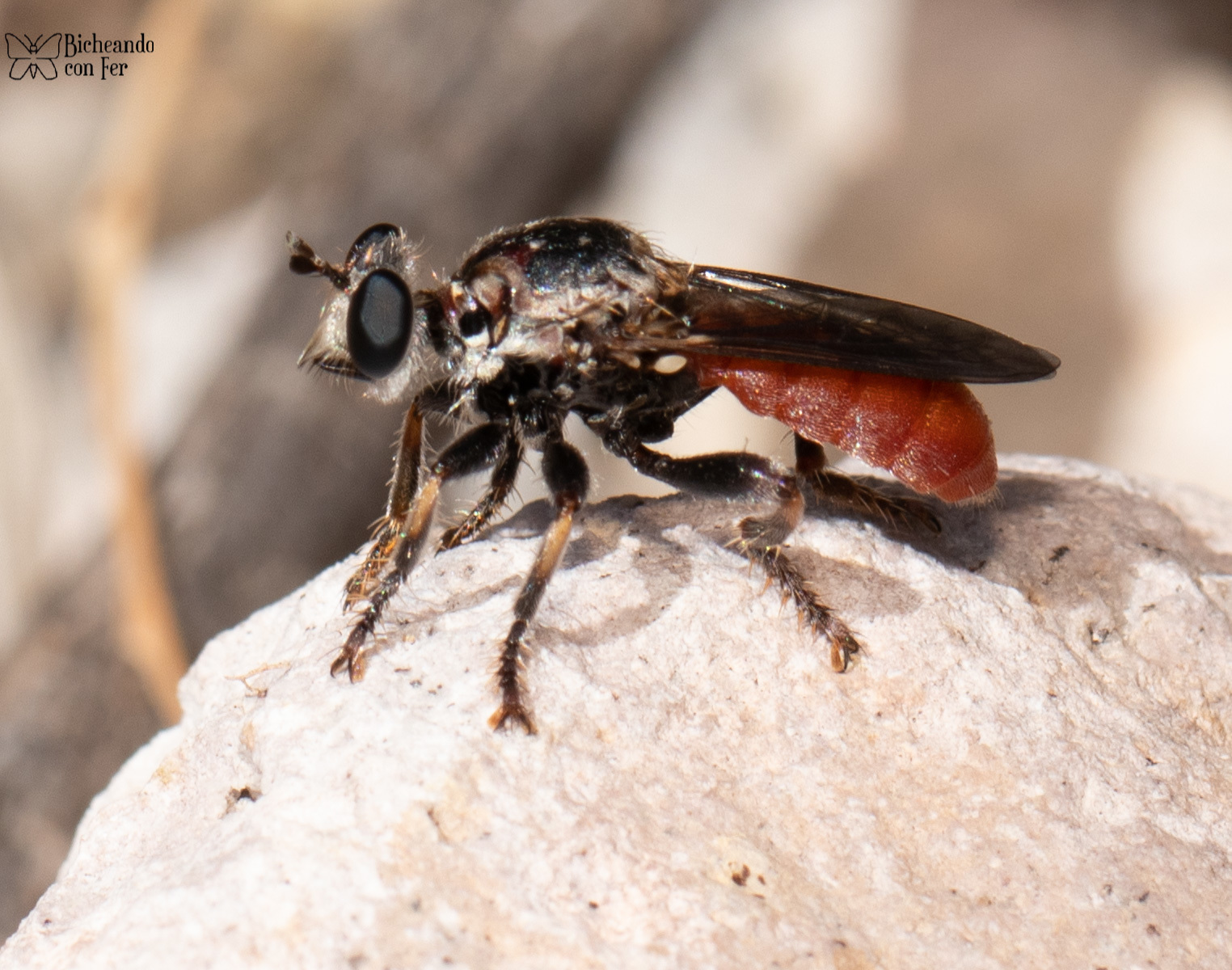

Scientific classification
- Domain: Eukaryota
- Kingdom: Animalia
- Phylum: Arthropoda
- Class: Insecta
- Order: Diptera
- Family: Asilidae
- Genus: Cerotainiops
- Species: C. omus

Binomial name
- Cerotainiops omus Pritchard, 1942

Synonyms
- Cerotainiops oma Pritchard, 1942

= Cerotainiops omus =

Species of fly

Cerotainiops omus is a species of robber fly in the family Asilidae.
