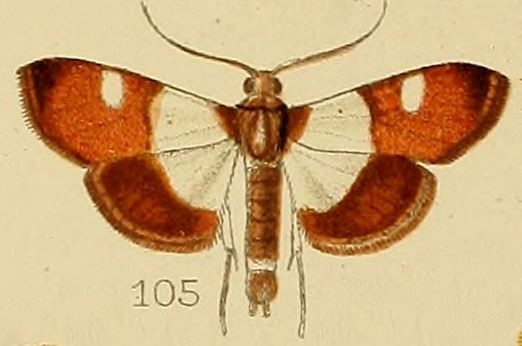
- Caprinia castanealis

Scientific classification
- Kingdom: Animalia
- Phylum: Arthropoda
- Class: Insecta
- Order: Lepidoptera
- Family: Crambidae
- Genus: Caprinia
- Species: C. castanealis

Binomial name
- Caprinia castanealis Kenrick, 1907

= Caprinia castanealis =

Species of moth

Caprinia castanealis is a species of moth of the family Crambidae. It is found in Papua New Guinea.

It has a wingspan of 36mm.
