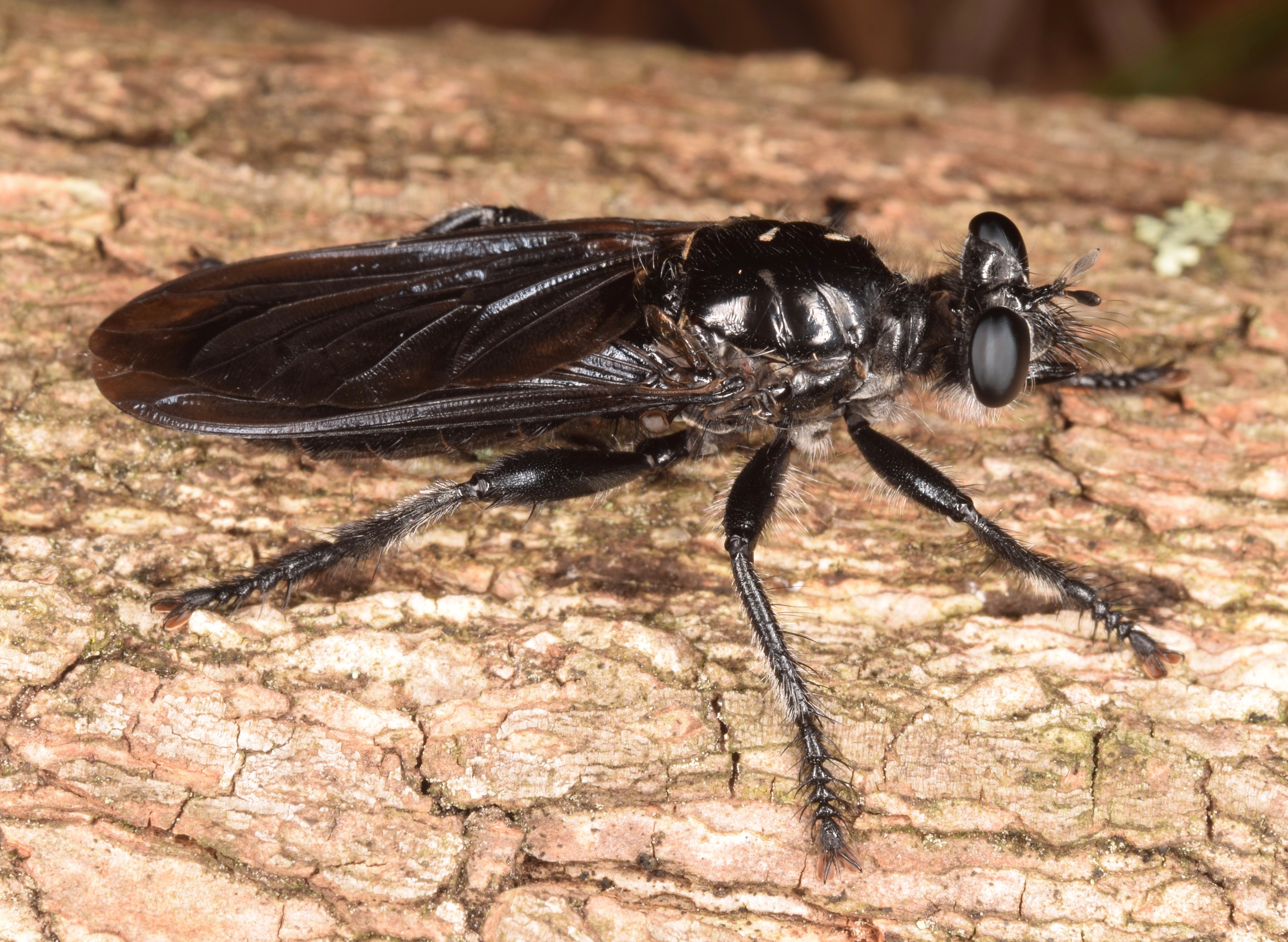

Scientific classification
- Domain: Eukaryota
- Kingdom: Animalia
- Phylum: Arthropoda
- Class: Insecta
- Order: Diptera
- Family: Asilidae
- Genus: Pogonosoma
- Species: P. dorsatum

Binomial name
- Pogonosoma dorsatum (Say, 1824)

Synonyms
- Laphria dorsata Say, 1824; Laphria melanoptera Wiedemann, 1828

= Pogonosoma dorsatum =

Species of fly

Pogonosoma dorsatum is a species of robber flies (insects in the family Asilidae).
