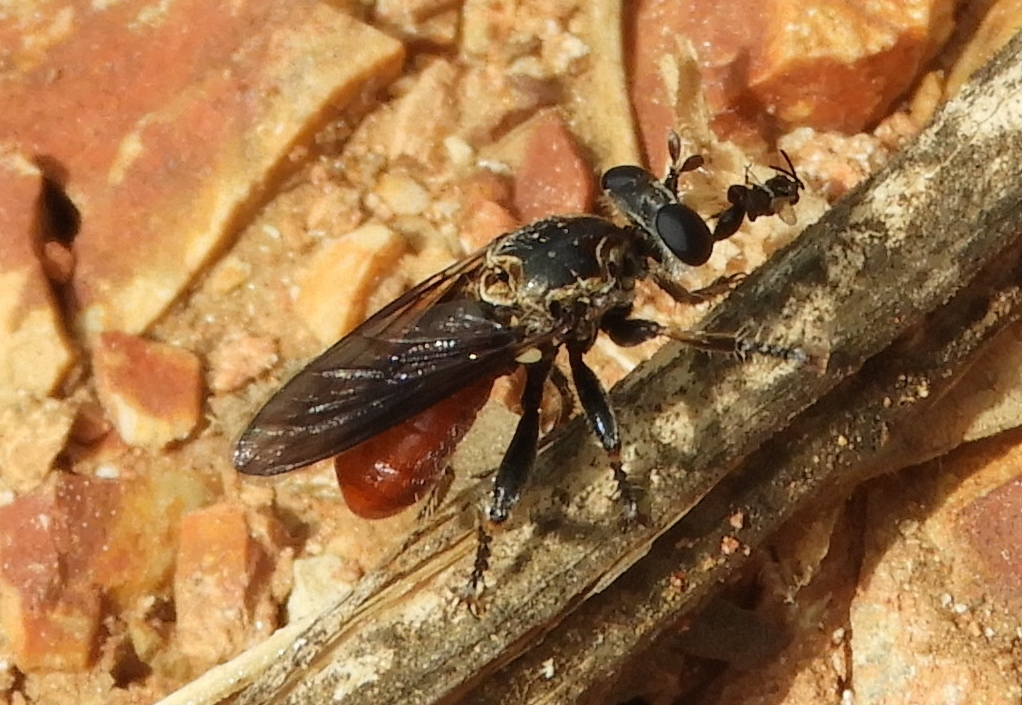

Scientific classification
- Domain: Eukaryota
- Kingdom: Animalia
- Phylum: Arthropoda
- Class: Insecta
- Order: Diptera
- Family: Asilidae
- Tribe: Laphriini
- Genus: Cerotainiops; Curran, 1930

= Cerotainiops =

Genus of flies

Cerotainiops is a genus of robber flies in the family Asilidae. There are about six described species in the genus Cerotainiops.

== Species ==
There are about six described species.

- Cerotainiops abdominalis Brown, 1897
- Cerotainiops kernae Martin, 1959
- Cerotainiops lucyae Martin, 1959
- Cerotainiops mcclayi Martin, 1959
- Cerotainiops omus Pritchard, 1942
- Cerotainiops wilcoxi Pritchard, 1942
