= Aphractia =

Scientific classification
- Domain: Eukaryota
- Kingdom: Animalia
- Phylum: Arthropoda
- Class: Insecta
- Order: Diptera
- Family: Asilidae
- Genus: Aphractia; Artigas, Papavero & Serra, 1991

Genus of flies

Aphractia is a genus of flies belonging to the family Asilidae.

Species:

- Aphractia longicornis (Hermann, 1912)
- Aphractia rubida (Hermann, 1912)
- Aphractia vivax (Hermann, 1912)
