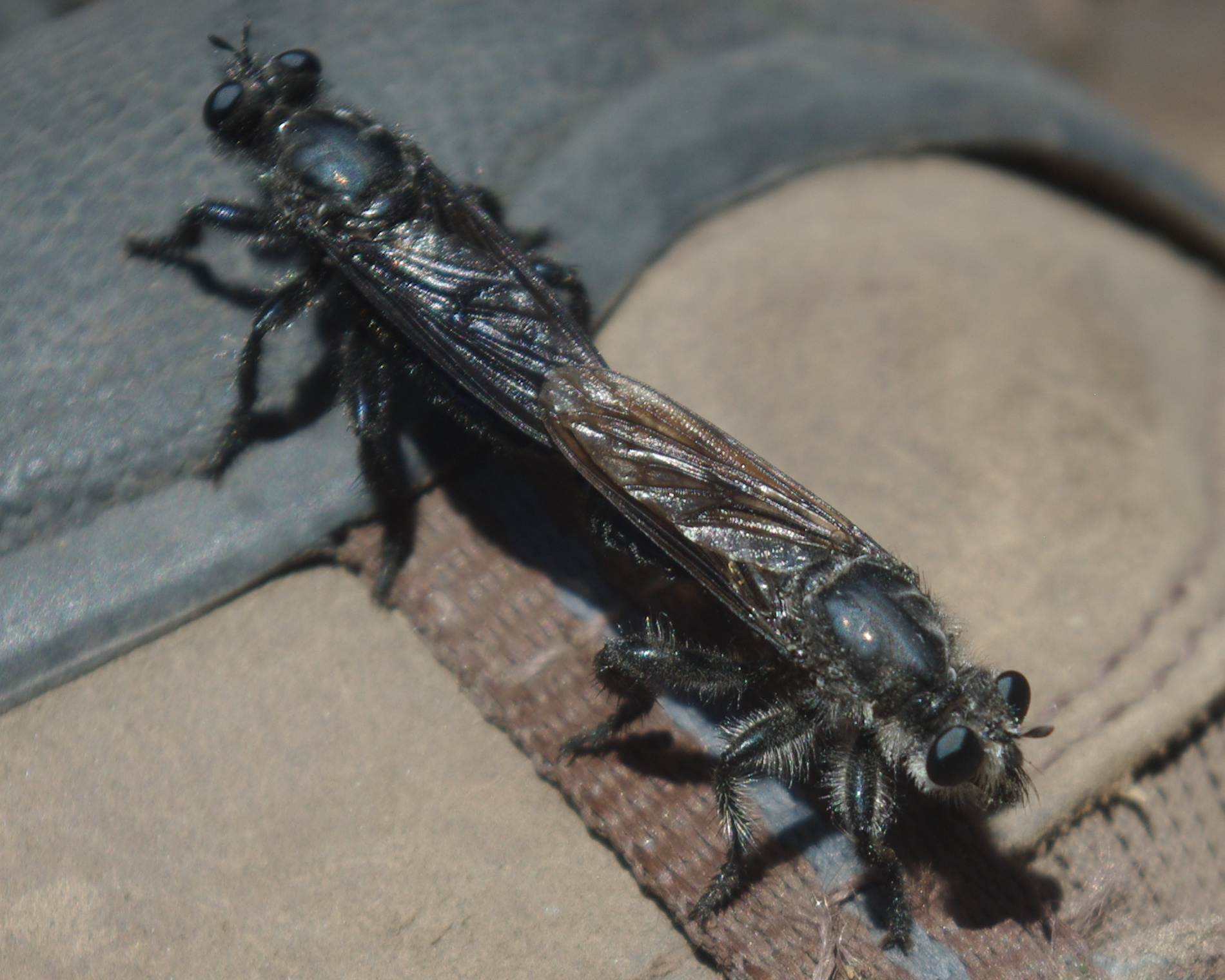
- Pogonosoma ridingsi

Scientific classification
- Kingdom: Animalia
- Phylum: Arthropoda
- Class: Insecta
- Order: Diptera
- Family: Asilidae
- Subfamily: Laphriinae
- Genus: Pogonosoma; Rondani, 1856

= Pogonosoma =

Genus of flies

Pogonosoma is a genus of robber flies (insects in the family Asilidae). There are about 17 described species in Pogonosoma.

== Species ==
These 17 species belong to the genus Pogonosoma:

- Pogonosoma albopilosum Meijere, 1913^{c g}
- Pogonosoma basifera (Walker, 1861)^{c g}
- Pogonosoma beccarii Rondani, 1875^{c g}
- Pogonosoma bleekeri (Doleschall, 1858)^{c g}
- Pogonosoma cedrusa Ricardo, 1927^{c g}
- Pogonosoma crassipes (Fabricius, 1805)^{c g}
- Pogonosoma cyanogaster Bezzi, 1916^{c g}
- Pogonosoma dorsatum (Say, 1824)^{i c g b}
- Pogonosoma funebris Hermann, 1914^{c g}
- Pogonosoma lugens Loew, 1873^{c g}
- Pogonosoma maroccanum (Fabricius, 1794)^{c g}
- Pogonosoma minor Loew, 1869^{c g}
- Pogonosoma ridingsi Cresson, 1920^{i c g b}
- Pogonosoma semifuscum Wulp, 1872^{c g}
- Pogonosoma stigmaticum Wulp, 1872^{c g}
- Pogonosoma unicolor Loew, 1873^{c g}
- Pogonosoma walkeri Daniels, 1989^{c g}

Data sources: i = ITIS, c = Catalogue of Life, g = GBIF, b = Bugguide.net
