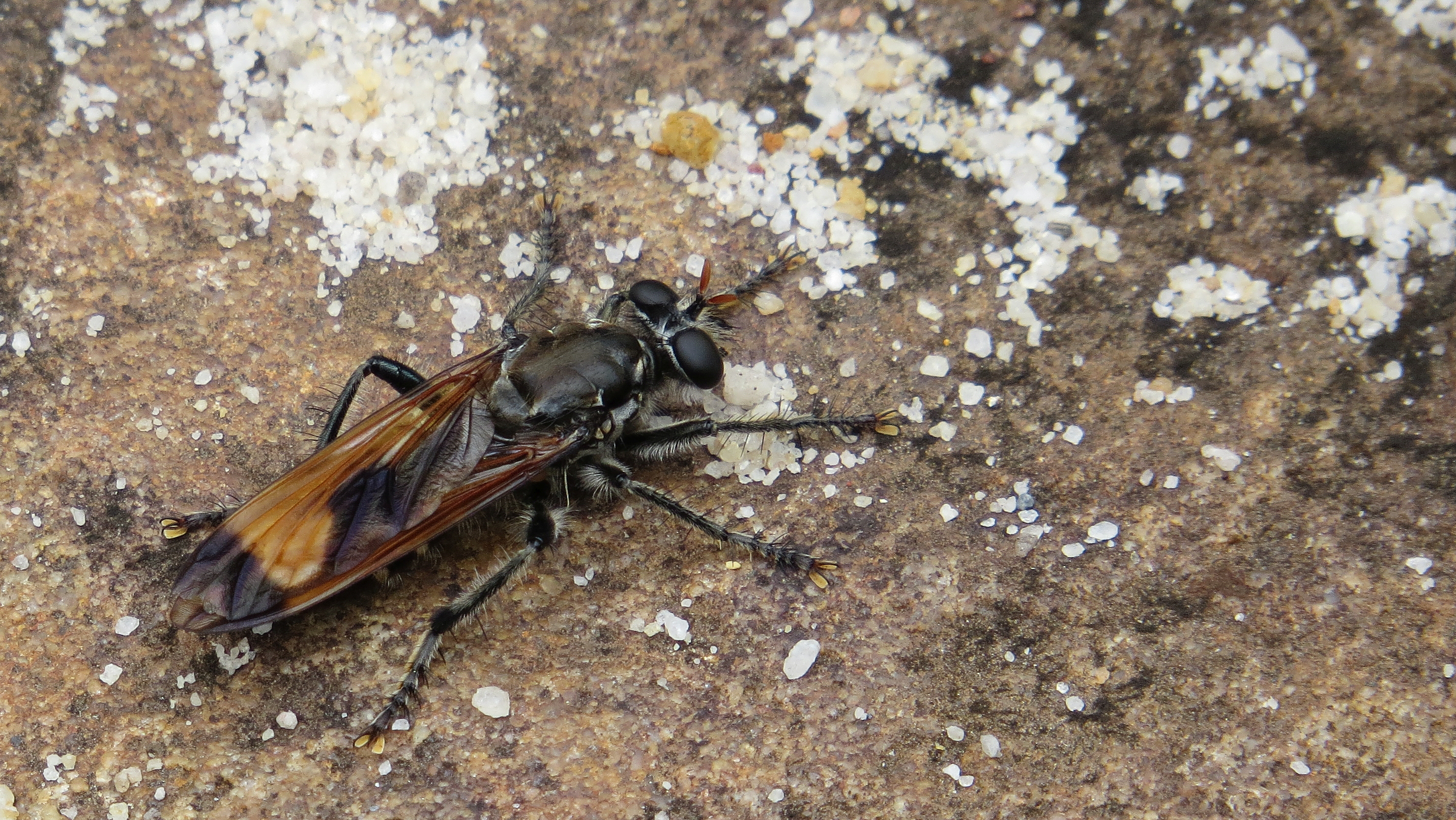
- Orthogonis ornatipennis

Scientific classification
- Domain: Eukaryota
- Kingdom: Animalia
- Phylum: Arthropoda
- Class: Insecta
- Order: Diptera
- Family: Asilidae
- Subfamily: Laphriinae
- Genus: Orthogonis; Herman, 1914

= Orthogonis =

Genus of flies

Orthogonis is a genus of robber flies (insects in the family Asilidae). There are about 14 described species in Orthogonis.

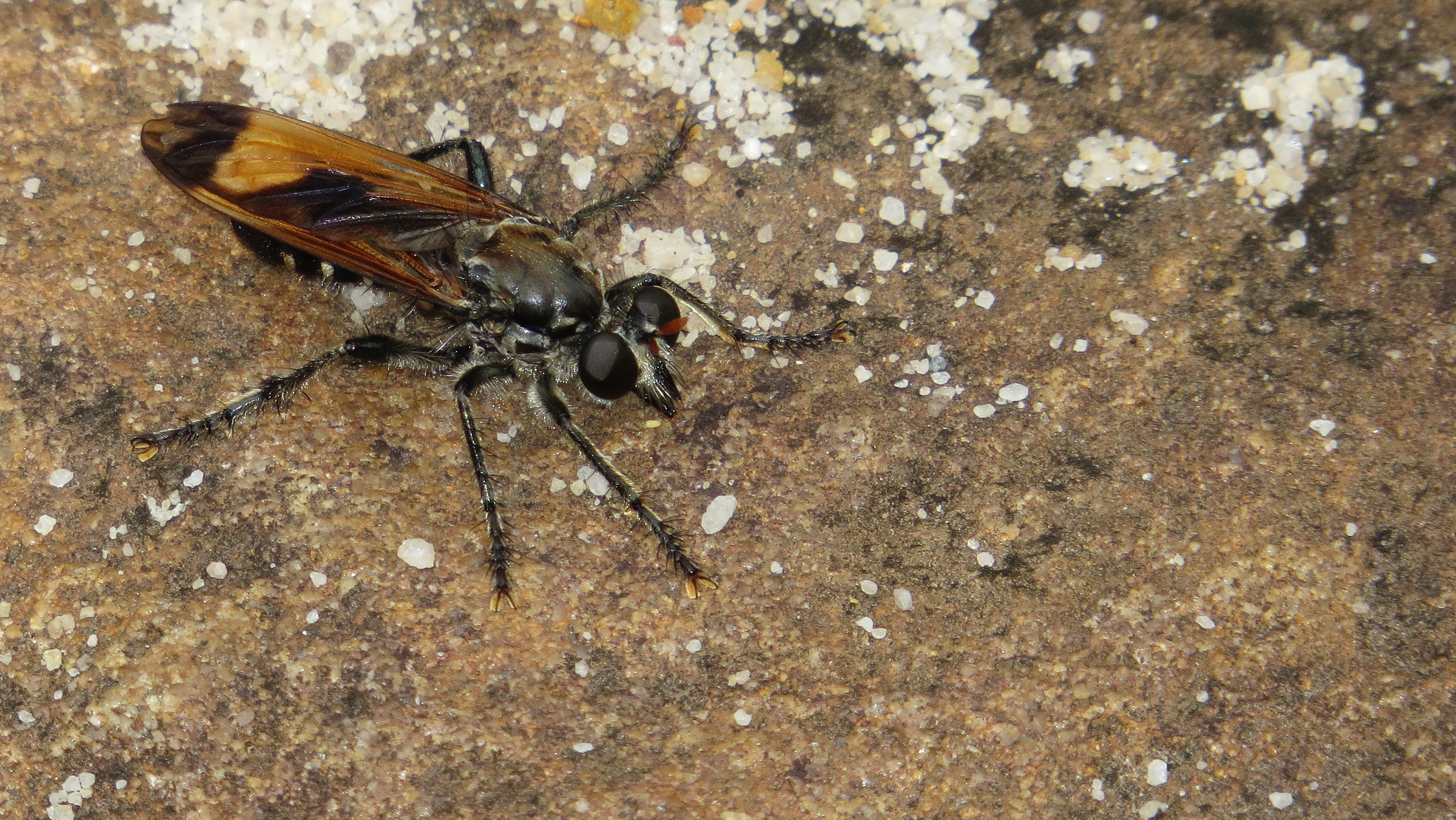
Orthogonis ornatipennis

== Species ==
These 14 species belong to the genus Orthogonis:

- Orthogonis andamanensis Joseph & Parui, 1981^{c g}
- Orthogonis campbelli (Paramonov, 1958)^{c g}
- Orthogonis clavata (White, 1914)^{c g}
- Orthogonis erythropus (Wulp, 1898)^{c g}
- Orthogonis liturifera (Walker, 1861)^{c g}
- Orthogonis madagascarensis Bromley, 1942^{c g}
- Orthogonis mauroides (Paramonov, 1958)^{c g}
- Orthogonis nigrocaerulea (Wulp, 1872)^{c g}
- Orthogonis nitididorsalis Tagawa, 2006^{c g}
- Orthogonis obliquistriga (Walker, 1861)^{c g}
- Orthogonis ornatipennis (Macquart, 1850)^{c g}
- Orthogonis scapularis (Wiedemann, 1828)^{c g}
- Orthogonis stygia (Bromley, 1931)^{i c g b}
- Orthogonis zentae (Paramonov, 1958)^{c g}

Data sources: i = ITIS, c = Catalogue of Life, g = GBIF, b = Bugguide.net
