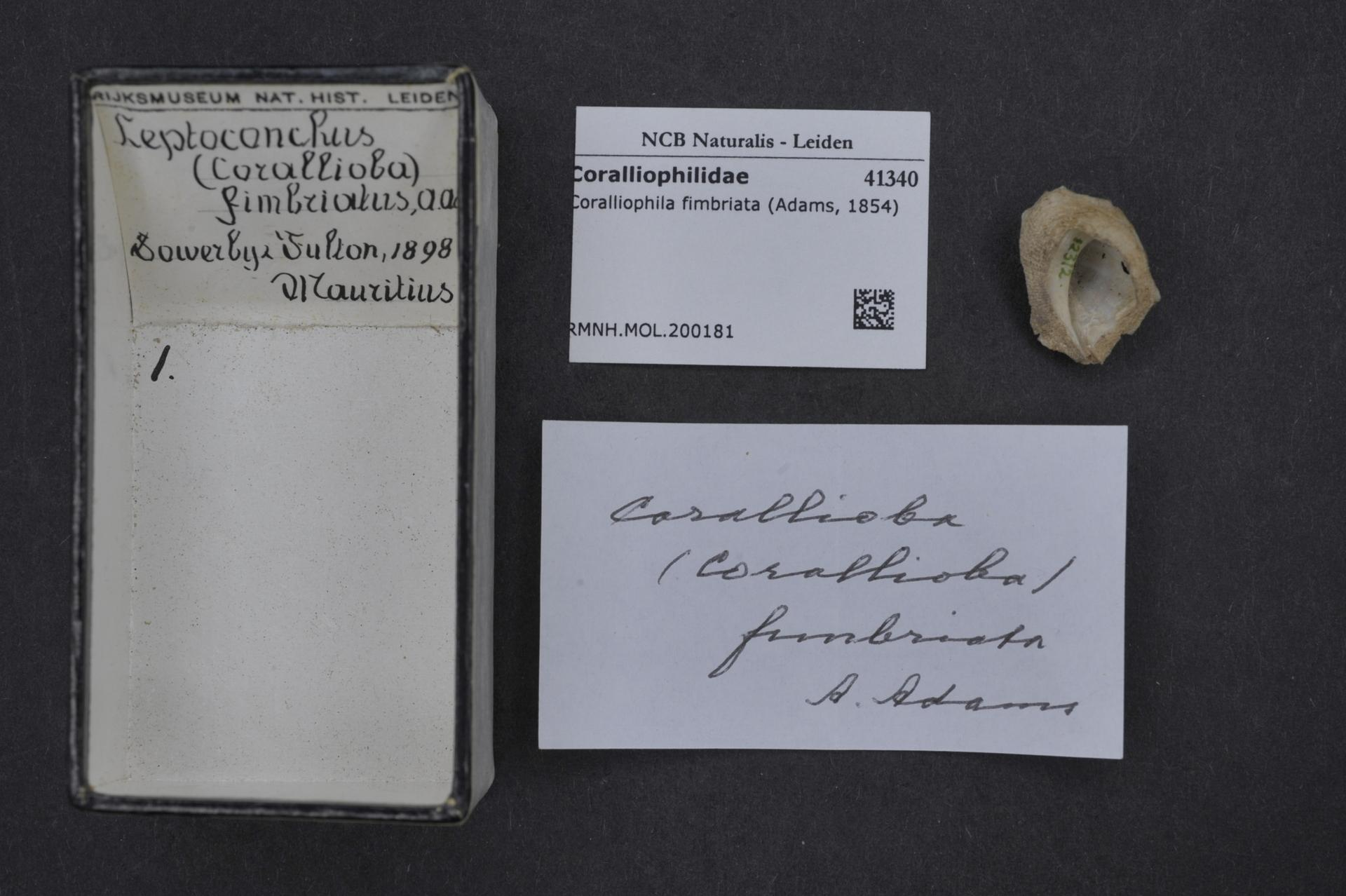
- Coralliophila fimbriata

Scientific classification
- Kingdom: Animalia
- Phylum: Mollusca
- Class: Gastropoda
- Subclass: Caenogastropoda
- Order: Neogastropoda
- Family: Muricidae
- Genus: Coralliophila
- Species: C. fimbriata

Binomial name
- Coralliophila fimbriata (A. Adams, 1852)

Synonyms
- Concholepas fimbriata A. Adams, 1852 (basionym); Coralliobia cancellata Pease, 1861; Coralliobia densicostata Shikama, 1963; Coralliobia fimbriata (A. Adams, 1854); Coralliobia sculptilis Pease, 1865; Coralliobia smithi Yen, 1942; Leptoconchus fimbriatus (A. Adams, 1852); Magilus fimbriatus A. Adams

= Coralliophila fimbriata =

Species of gastropod

Coralliophila fimbriata is a species of sea snail, a marine gastropod mollusk in the family Muricidae, the murex snails or rock snails.

== Description ==
The shell size varies between 8 mm and 27 mm.

== Distribution ==
This species is distributed in the Red Sea, in the Indian Ocean along Mauritius and the Mascarene Basin and in the Indo-West Pacific.
