= Zabrops =

Scientific classification
- Domain: Eukaryota
- Kingdom: Animalia
- Phylum: Arthropoda
- Class: Insecta
- Order: Diptera
- Family: Asilidae
- Tribe: Laphystiini
- Genus: Zabrops; Hull, 1957

Genus of flies

Zabrops is a genus of robber flies in the family Asilidae. There are about eight described species in Zabrops.

== Species ==
These eight species belong to the genus Zabrops:

- Zabrops argutus Fisher, 1977
- Zabrops arroyalis Fisher, 1977
- Zabrops flavipilis (Jones, 1907)
- Zabrops janiceae Fisher, 1977
- Zabrops playalis Fisher, 1977
- Zabrops tagax (Williston, 1883)
- Zabrops thologaster Fisher, 1977
- Zabrops wilcoxi FISHER, 1977
