= Lamyra (fly) =

Scientific classification
- Kingdom: Animalia
- Phylum: Arthropoda
- Class: Insecta
- Order: Diptera
- Family: Asilidae
- Genus: Lamyra

Genus of flies

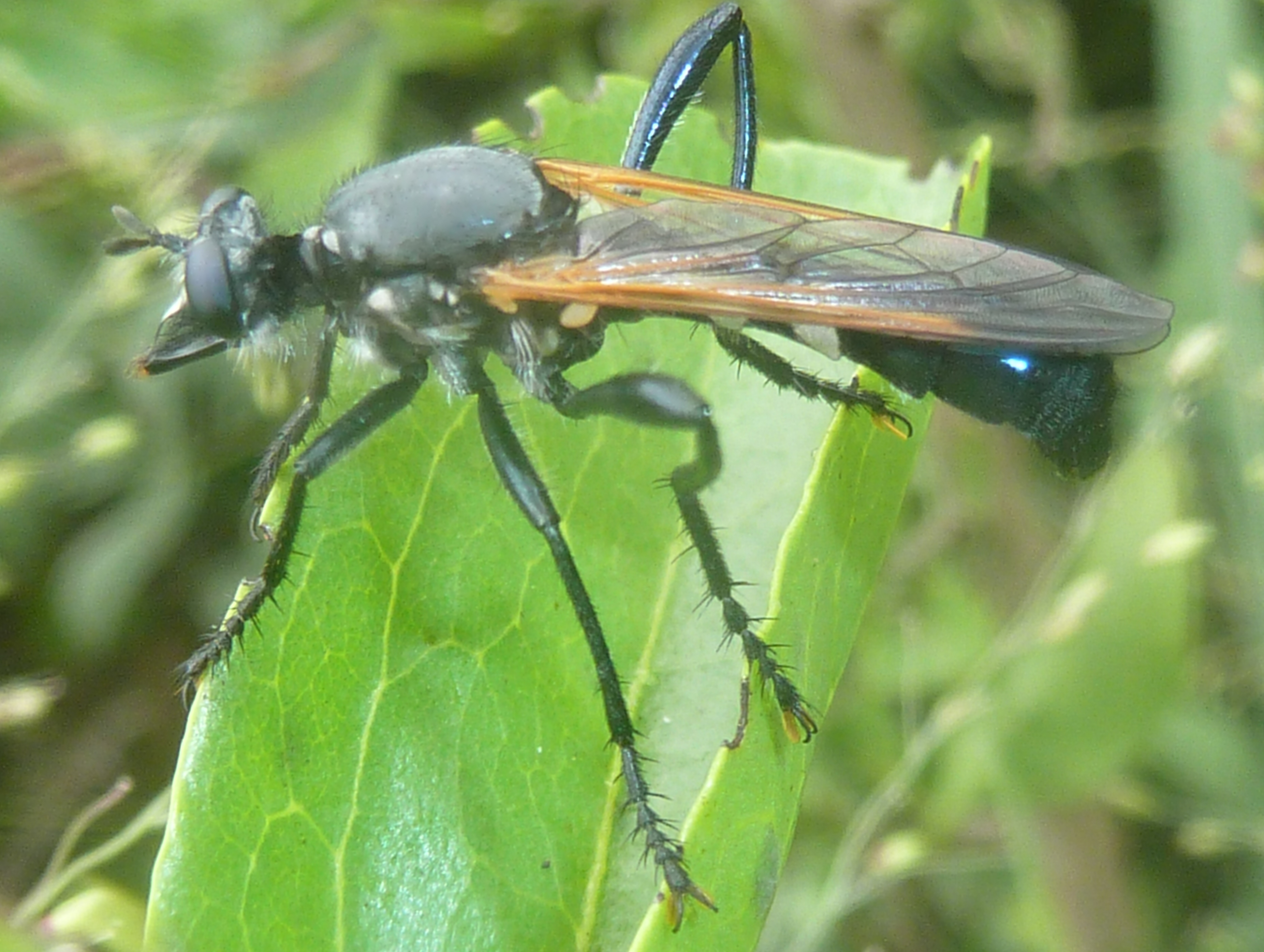
Lamyra gulo

Lamyra is a genus of robber flies in the family Asilidae. There are at least 30 described species in Lamyra.

== Species ==
These 39 species belong to the genus Lamyra:

- Lamyra amurensis (Hermann, 1914)^{c g}
- Lamyra antipai Weinberg & Parvu, 1999^{c g}
- Lamyra asprospilos Young & Hradsky, 2007^{c g}
- Lamyra castellanii (Hradsky, 1962)^{c g}
- Lamyra caucasicus Richter, 1971^{c g}
- Lamyra caudatus Lehr, 1991^{c g}
- Lamyra dimidiata (Loew, 1847)^{c g}
- Lamyra dioctriaeformis (Meigen, 1820)^{c g}
- Lamyra fmbriata (Meigen, 1820)^{c g}
- Lamyra fortunatus Baez & Weinberg, 1981^{c g}
- Lamyra fuliginosa (Panzer, 1798)^{c g}
- Lamyra fulva (Meigen, 1804)^{c g}
- Lamyra greatheadi Oldroyd, 1974^{c g}
- Lamyra gulo (Loew, 1851)^{c g}
- Lamyra hamardabanica Lehr, 1991^{c g}
- Lamyra ignea (Meigen, 1820)^{c g}
- Lamyra isshikii (Matsumura, 1916)^{c g}
- Lamyra komure (Matsumura, 1911)^{c g}
- Lamyra lapponica (Zetterstedt, 1838)^{c g}
- Lamyra loewi (Lehr, 1991)^{c g}
- Lamyra marginata (Linnaeus, 1758)^{c g}
- Lamyra montanus Lehr, 1977^{c g}
- Lamyra mouchai Hradsky, 1985^{c g}
- Lamyra nigrovittata (Matsumura, 1916)^{c g}
- Lamyra nikolaevi Lehr, 1977^{c g}
- Lamyra nobilis (Walker, 1871)^{c g}
- Lamyra perrara Lehr, 1991^{c g}
- Lamyra pleskei Becker & Stein, 1913^{c g}
- Lamyra potanini Lehr, 1991^{c g}
- Lamyra rossi Oldroyd, 1974^{c g}
- Lamyra rufipes (Fallen, 1814)^{c g}
- Lamyra scelestus Richter, 1974^{c g}
- Lamyra steinbergi Richter, 1964^{c g}
- Lamyra taiga Lehr, 1991^{c g}
- Lamyra tenebrosus Esipenko, 1974^{c g}
- Lamyra ursula (Loew, 1851)^{c g}
- Lamyra vorax Loew, 1858^{c g}
- Lamyra xanthotrix (Hermann, 1914)^{c g}
- Lamyra yaeyamana Haupt & Azuma, 1998^{c g}

Data sources: i = ITIS, c = Catalogue of Life, g = GBIF, b = Bugguide.net
