= Caprinia fimbriata =

Scientific classification
- Kingdom: Animalia
- Phylum: Arthropoda
- Class: Insecta
- Order: Lepidoptera
- Family: Crambidae
- Genus: Caprinia
- Species: C. fimbriata

Binomial name
- Caprinia fimbriata (E. Hering, 1903)

Synonyms
- Cydalima fimbriata E. Hering, 1903

Species of moth

Caprinia fimbriata is a moth in the family Crambidae. It was described by E. Hering in 1903. It is found on Sulawesi.
