= Tricella (fly) =

Scientific classification
- Domain: Eukaryota
- Kingdom: Animalia
- Phylum: Arthropoda
- Class: Insecta
- Order: Diptera
- Family: Asilidae
- Genus: Tricella

Genus of flies

Tricella is a genus of robber flies in the family Asilidae. There is at least one described species in Tricella, T. calcar.

Tricella was also the name of a genus of leafhoppers until 2017, when it was renamed to Carpaneura.
