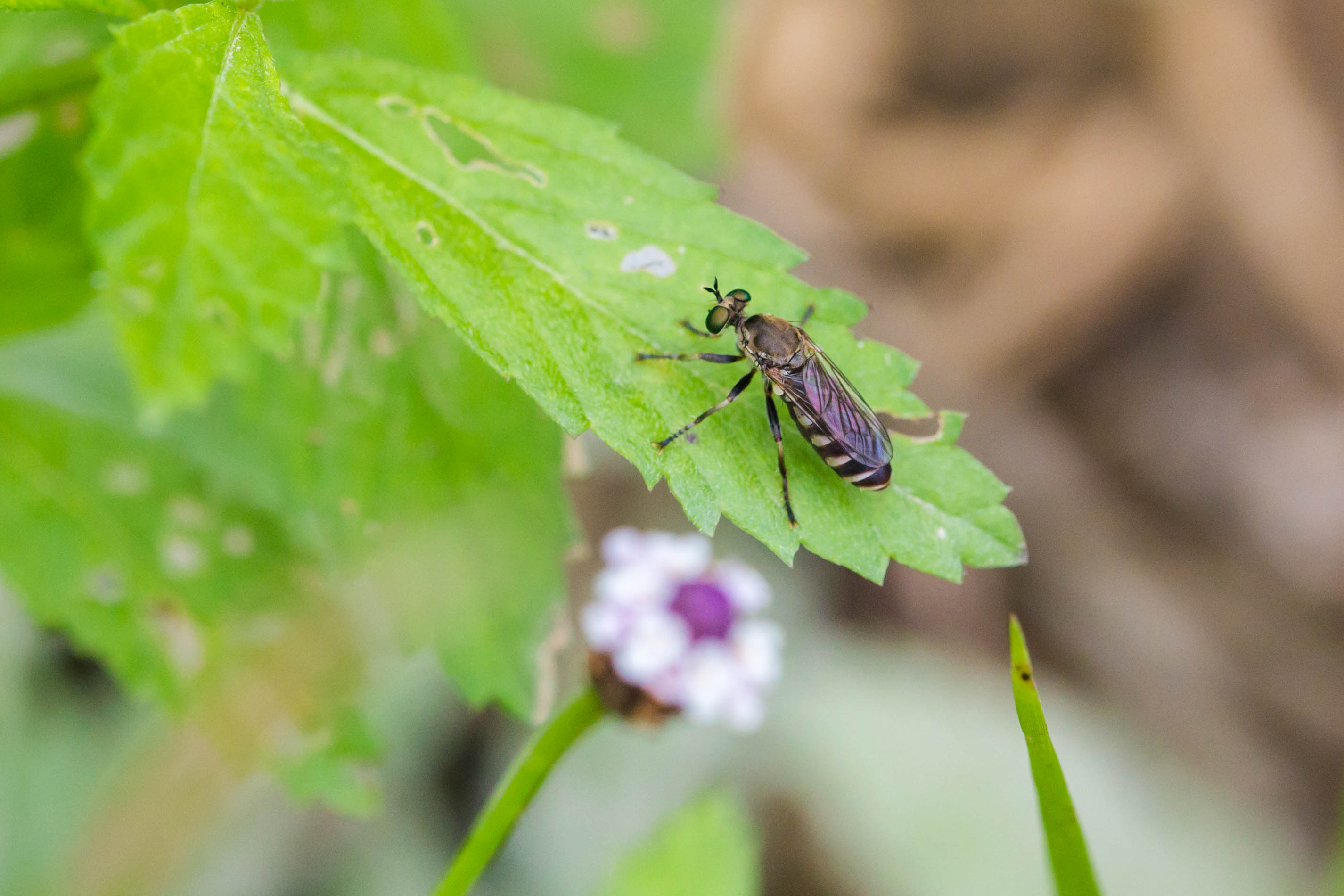

Scientific classification
- Domain: Eukaryota
- Kingdom: Animalia
- Phylum: Arthropoda
- Class: Insecta
- Order: Diptera
- Family: Asilidae
- Tribe: Laphystiini
- Genus: Psilocurus; Loew, 1874

= Psilocurus =

Genus of flies

Psilocurus is a genus of robber flies in the family of Asilidae. There are about 14 described species in Psilocurus.

== Species ==
These 14 species belong to the genus Psilocurus:

- Psilocurus birdi Curran, 1931
- Psilocurus blascoi Weinberg & Bachli, 2001
- Psilocurus camposi Curran, 1931
- Psilocurus caudatus Williston, 1901
- Psilocurus hypopygialis (Paramonov, 1930)
- Psilocurus modestus (Williston, 1893)
- Psilocurus negrus Lehr, 1974
- Psilocurus nudiusculus Loew, 1874
- Psilocurus pallustris Hull, 1961
- Psilocurus puellus Bromley, 1934
- Psilocurus pygmaeus Hull, 1961
- Psilocurus reinhardi Bromley, 1951
- Psilocurus tibialis Hull, 1961
- † Paraclia tarsalis (Statz, 1940)
