= Maira (fly) =

Scientific classification
- Kingdom: Animalia
- Phylum: Arthropoda
- Class: Insecta
- Order: Diptera
- Family: Asilidae
- Genus: Maira

Genus of flies

Maira is a genus of robber flies in the family Asilidae. There are at least 50 described species in Maira.

== Species ==
These 57 species belong to the genus Maira:

- Maira abscissa (Walker, 1860)^{c g}
- Maira aenea (Fabricius, 1805)^{c g}
- Maira albifacies Wulp, 1872^{c g}
- Maira appendiculata Bezzi, 1928^{c g}
- Maira aterrima Hermann, 1914^{c g}
- Maira auribarbis (Macquart, 1848)^{c}
- Maira aurifacies (Macquart, 1848)^{c}
- Maira bicolor Joseph & Parui, 1987^{c g}
- Maira bisnigra Bigot, 1878^{c g}
- Maira calopogon (Bigot, 1878)^{c g}
- Maira cambodgiensis Bigot, 1878^{c g}
- Maira claripennis (Le Guillou, 1842)^{c g}
- Maira compta Walker, 1862^{c g}
- Maira condecora (Walker, 1862)^{c g}
- Maira conveniens (Walker, 1861)^{c g}
- Maira delfinadoi Joseph & Parui, 1981^{c g}
- Maira elegans (Walker, 1855)^{c g}
- Maira elysiaca Osten Sacken, 1881^{c g}
- Maira flagellata (Walker, 1862)^{c g}
- Maira germana (Walker, 1858)^{c g}
- Maira gloriosa (Walker, 1858)^{c g}
- Maira gracilicornis Meijere, 1914^{c g}
- Maira hirta Meijere, 1913^{c g}
- Maira hispidella Wulp, 1872^{c g}
- Maira indiana Joseph & Parui, 1987^{c g}
- Maira kollari (Doleschall, 1857)^{c g}
- Maira lauta Wulp, 1885^{c g}
- Maira leei (Paramonov, 1958)^{c g}
- Maira limbidorsum Bezzi, 1928^{c g}
- Maira longicornis Meijere, 1913^{c g}
- Maira longirostrata Bromley, 1935^{c g}
- Maira nieifacies (Macquart, 1850)^{c g}
- Maira nigrithorax Wulp, 1872^{c g}
- Maira nigropilosa Meijere, 1913^{c g}
- Maira niveifacies (Macquart, 1850)^{c g}
- Maira nychthemera Wulp, 1872^{c g}
- Maira occulta Wulp, 1872^{c g}
- Maira paradisiaca (Walker, 1859)^{c g}
- Maira paria Bigot, 1878^{c g}
- Maira placens (Walker, 1859)^{c g}
- Maira pseudoindiana Joseph & Parui, 1995^{c g}
- Maira requista (Walker, 1859)^{c g}
- Maira setipes (Walker, 1862)^{c g}
- Maira smaragdina Bigot, 1878^{c g}
- Maira sodalis (Walker, 1858)^{c g}
- Maira splendida (Guerin Meneville, 1831)^{c g}
- Maira superba Meijere, 1913^{c g}
- Maira tincta Meijere, 1913^{c g}
- Maira tomentosa Wulp, 1872^{c g}
- Maira tuberculata Wulp, 1872^{c g}
- Maira vanderwulpi Meijere, 1913^{c g}
- Maira varians Ricardo, 1929^{c g}
- Maira villipes (Doleschall, 1857)^{c g}
- Maira whitneyi Curran, 1936^{c g}
- Maira willowsi Curran, 1936^{c g}
- Maira wollastoni Austen, 1915^{c g}
- Maira xizangensis Shi, 1995^{c g}

Data sources: i = ITIS, c = Catalogue of Life, g = GBIF, b = Bugguide.net
