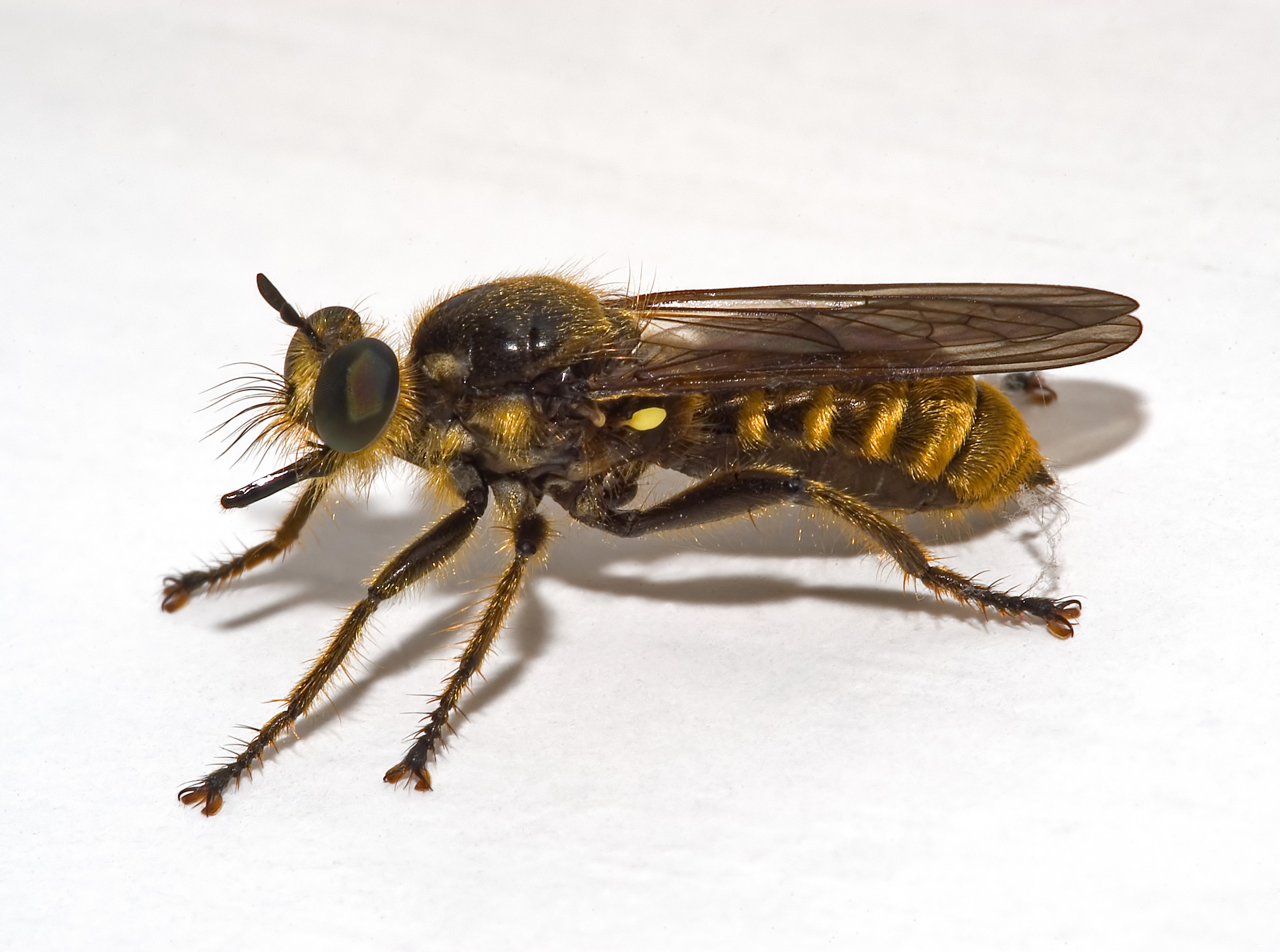

Scientific classification
- Kingdom: Animalia
- Phylum: Arthropoda
- Class: Insecta
- Order: Diptera
- Family: Asilidae
- Genus: Choerades
- Species: C. fimbriata

Binomial name
- Choerades fimbriata (Meigen, 1820)

= Choerades fimbriata =

Species of fly

Choerades fimbriata is a fly in the family Asilidae.

== Features ==
The flies reach a body length of 11 to 17 millimetres. Their first antennae link is about twice as long as the following one. The tergites of the abdomen are black in colour and have yellow hairs on the sides at the back. On the first tergite the hairs are white and long. The proboscis is compressed at the sides. The area between the antennae and the beard at the front of the head is hairless.

== Range ==
The species is distributed from western Europe to the Caucasus and Siberia.
