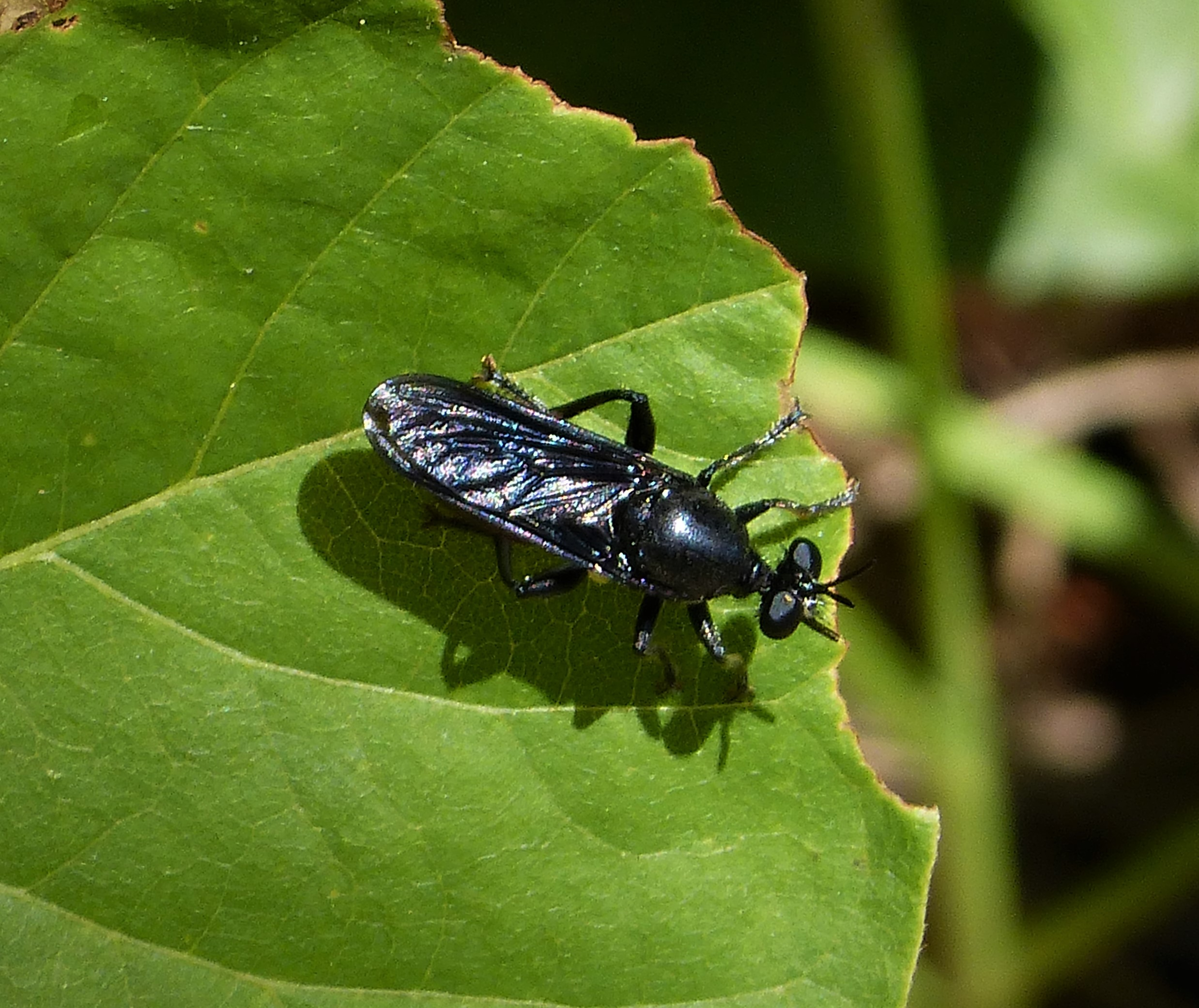
- Lampria species

Scientific classification
- Kingdom: Animalia
- Phylum: Arthropoda
- Clade: Pancrustacea
- Class: Insecta
- Order: Diptera
- Family: Asilidae
- Subfamily: Laphriinae
- Genus: Lampria; Macquart, 1838

= Lampria =

Genus of flies

Lampria is a genus of robber flies in the family Asilidae. There are at least 20 described species in Lampria.

== Species ==
These 20 species belong to the genus Lampria:

- Lampria aurifex Osten Sacken, 1887^{c g}
- Lampria bicincta Walker, 1860^{c g}
- Lampria bicolor (Wiedemann, 1828)^{i c g b}
- Lampria cilipes Walker, 1857^{c g}
- Lampria circumdata Bellardi, 1861^{c g}
- Lampria clavipes (Fabricius, 1805)^{c g}
- Lampria corallogaster (Bigot, 1878)^{i c g}
- Lampria dives (Wiedemann, 1828)^{c g}
- Lampria fulgida Schiner, 1868^{c g}
- Lampria homopoda (Bellardi, 1862)^{c g}
- Lampria ichneumom (Osten Sacken, 1887)^{c g}
- Lampria macquarti (Perty, 1833)^{c}
- Lampria mexicana Macquart, 1847^{c g}
- Lampria parvula Bigot, 1878^{c g}
- Lampria pusilla (Macquart, 1838)^{c g}
- Lampria rubriventris (Macquart, 1834)^{i c b}
- Lampria scapularis Bigot, 1878^{c g}
- Lampria spinipes (Fabricius, 1805)^{c g}
- Lampria splendens (Macquart, 1834)^{c g}
- Lampria tolmides (Walker, 1849)^{c g}

Data sources: i = ITIS, c = Catalogue of Life, g = GBIF, b = Bugguide.net
