= Hodites (fly) =

Scientific classification
- Domain: Eukaryota
- Kingdom: Animalia
- Phylum: Arthropoda
- Class: Insecta
- Order: Diptera
- Family: Asilidae
- Genus: Hodites

Genus of flies

Hodites is a genus of robber flies in the family Asilidae. There is at least one described species in Hodites, H. punctissima.
