= Dasylechia =

Scientific classification
- Domain: Eukaryota
- Kingdom: Animalia
- Phylum: Arthropoda
- Class: Insecta
- Order: Diptera
- Family: Asilidae
- Genus: Dasylechia; Williston, 1907
- Species: D. atrox

Binomial name
- Dasylechia atrox (Williston, 1883)

Genus of flies

Dasylechia is a genus of robber flies in the family Asilidae. There is one described species in Dasylechia, D. atrox.
