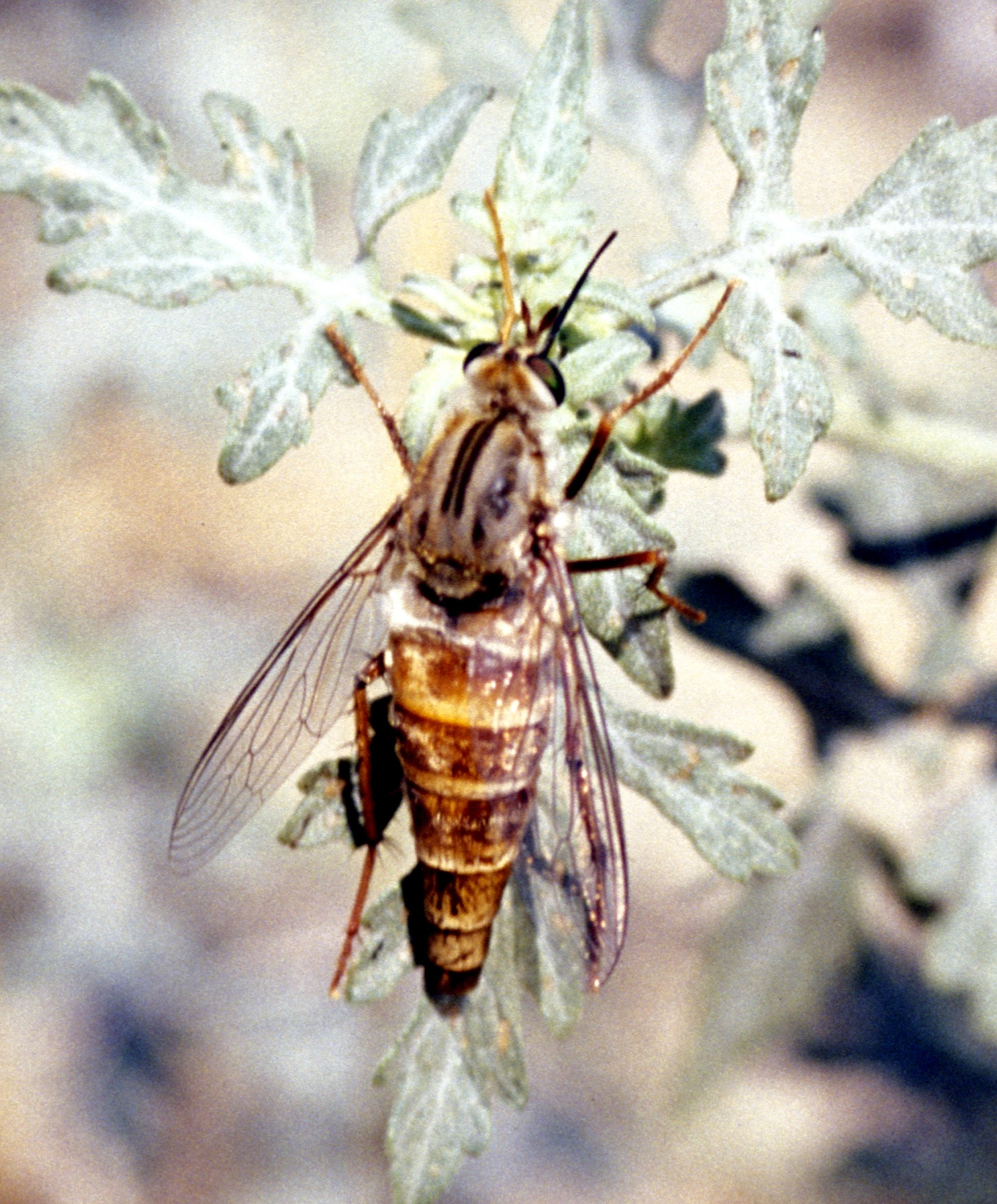

Conservation status
- Endangered (ESA)

Scientific classification
- Kingdom: Animalia
- Phylum: Arthropoda
- Clade: Pancrustacea
- Class: Insecta
- Order: Diptera
- Family: Mydidae
- Genus: Rhaphiomidas
- Species: R. terminatus
- Subspecies: R. t. abdominalis

Trinomial name
- Rhaphiomidas terminatus abdominalis Cazier, 1941

= Delhi Sands flower-loving fly =

Species of insect

The Delhi Sands flower-loving fly (Rhaphiomidas terminatus abdominalis) is a subspecies of flower-loving fly, a member of the genus Rhaphiomidas in the family Mydidae. It was the first fly added to the Endangered Species List in the United States.

This subspecies is restricted to the Delhi sand dunes formation, an area of ancient inland dunes in Southern California. Originally, the habitat area consisted of about 40 square miles (100 km^{2}). However, only a few hundred acres, or about 2% of the original habitat area, remain undeveloped. The rest largely now form much or all of the foundation on which the towns of Colton, Fontana, Rancho Cucamonga, Rialto, and Ontario, California are built.

Adult R. t. abdominalis flies are only active for a few weeks each year, feeding on flowers in June, July, August and September. Residential and commercial development, agricultural conversion, sand mining, invasion by exotic species, dumping of cow manure and trash, and off-road vehicle use have resulted in significant loss and modification of the species' native habitat. Estimates are that over 97% of the original habitat is already gone, and only a portion of what remains is suitable habitat for these flies.

The species was emergency-listed by the United States Fish and Wildlife Service on September 23, 1993, which has been an extremely contentious listing ever since. Political officials and news services from the region have repeatedly decried this fly as a disease-carrying pest, despite documentation that it is not. There have been repeated attempts by local officials to have the species de-listed. For example, Congressman Joe Baca proposed removing the Delhi Sands flower-loving fly off the Endangered Species List to encourage development. There are an estimated 5–10 more species of insects endemic to the Delhi Sands formation, including newly discovered and still unnamed species of scarab beetle, sand roach, and Jerusalem cricket.

== Taxonomy and description ==
The Delhi Sands flower-loving fly is a large insect in the Dipteran family Mydidae. It has an elongate body, much like that of a robber fly (Asilidae), but unlike asilids, it has a long tubular proboscis (mouthparts) that may be used, as in butterflies, for extracting nectar from flowers. The Delhi Sands flower-loving fly is approximately 2.5 centimeters (1 inch) long, orange-brown in color, and has dark brown oval spots on the upper surface of the abdomen. This animal is a strong fast flier, and, like a hummingbird, is capable of stationary, hovering flight.

The genus Rhaphiomidas formerly was considered to be a member of the fly family Apioceridae. However, recent taxonomic studies of the insect order Diptera indicate that it belongs in the family Mydidae. The distribution of Rhaphiomidas and the three related genera is unusual and indicates the group has great geological antiquity. The latter three genera are each found in South Africa, Chile, and Australia. This southern hemisphere distribution strongly indicates that the origin of these groups lies with a common ancestor that inhabited the southern landmass known as Gondwana before its breakup, caused by continental drift during the Mesozoic era more than 100 million years ago.

Rhaphiomidas is a North American genus of 19 species and 5 subspecies, which inhabit arid regions of the southwestern United States and northwestern Mexico. At least one species, the Acton flower-loving fly (Rhaphiomidas acton) is an important pollinator of the Santa Ana woolly star (Eriastrum densifolium ssp. sanctorum), a federally endangered plant (52 Federal Register 36265).

Rhaphiomidas terminatus consists of two subspecies, the El Segundo flower-loving fly (Rhaphiomidas terminatus terminatus) and the Delhi Sands flower-loving fly (Rhaphiomidas terminatus abdominalis) (figure 1). Specimens of R. terminatus were misidentified as Rhaphiomidas episcopus by D.W. Coquillett (1891) from Los Angeles, California. Townsend (1895) referred to these specimens as Rhaphiomidas mellifex. Cazier (1941) noted that both identifications were in error and used the specimens collected by Coquillett to describe R. terminatus as a new species. Later in the same publication, the Delhi Sands flower-loving fly was described as Rhaphiomidas abdominalis, based on an adult male collected in August 1888 in Colton, California. In 1941, when both R. terminatus and R. abdominalis were described, Cazier had only two specimens of each taxon available for examination, and these individuals appeared to represent distinct species. However, when the genus was revised (Cazier 1985), it was determined that abdominalis is a subspecies of R. terminatus, based on abdominal spot patterns and other morphological characters. Historically restricted to the El Segundo dunes and associated habitats, Rhaphiomidas terminatus terminatus is presumed extinct; thus, Rhaphiomidas terminatus abdominalis is the only existing representative of this species. A complete description and illustration of this subspecies can be found in Cazier (1985).

== Geographic distribution ==
All existing populations known of the Delhi Sands flower-loving fly occur within an 8-mile radius of each other. The distribution straddles Interstate 10 in the vicinity of Colton and Rialto, Riverside and San Bernardino Counties, California. One of the remaining population sites is on land owned by the County of San Bernardino, another is on land owned by a public utility, and portions of the largest remaining habitat are owned by a municipality. The remaining sites are on private land. Small patches of restorable habitat may exist in remnants of the Delhi dunes and Colton dunes in the same counties.

== Life history ==
The Delhi Sands flower-loving fly undergoes a complete metamorphosis (egg, larva, pupa, and adult). The life span of this animal is unknown, but the larval stage may last two years or longer, depending on availability of food, temperature, rainfall, and other environmental conditions. The adults are active in the late summer and the early stages can be found throughout the year. Except for the adults, the animal spends its entire life cycle underground. The adults emerge and become active in the early summer.

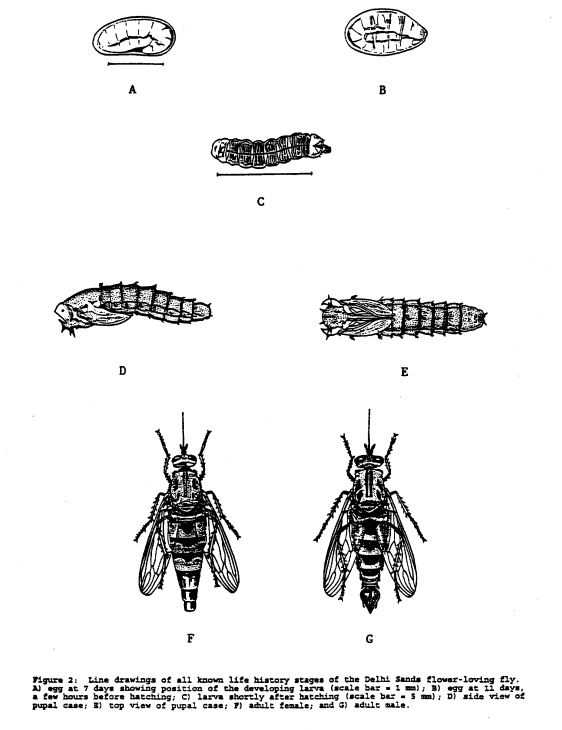
Anatomical drawing of Delhi sands flower-loving fly stages of life

=== Mating ===
After mating, the females lay their eggs in suitable sandy soil. Rogers and Mattoni (1993) described their observations of two male and two female captive Delhi Sands flower-loving flies. The males lived for 3 days in captivity and would not eat. The females lived for 5 and 8 days, respectively. The females became active at 10:00 am. Pacific Daylight time (PDT) each day, regardless of light conditions and became inactive about 5:00 pm PDT, except when ovipositing.

=== Egg ===
One of the females was observed to oviposit at about 7:30 pm PDT. She laid a total of 40 eggs in the sand. The eggs were about 1.5 x 3 millimeters (less than 0.1 square inch), almost kidney-shaped, and pure white with a slight pink iridescence.

Female flower-loving flies possess specialized egg-laying organs on the last segment on their abdomens (acanthophorites). A single acanthophorite consists of a circle of strong spines that can be rapidly revolved to serve as a drill adapted to boring through sandy soils, enabling the abdomen to be inserted almost completely underground. The abdomen and the ovipositor are extensible and the eggs can be placed between 3 and 5 centimeters (1 to 2 inches) beneath the surface of the sand. This adaption assures that the eggs are placed in a cooler more moist environment than the surface of the sand. Most oviposition takes place in the shade of shrubs, such as the telegraph weed (Heterotheca grandiflora). The larvae hatched from the eggs in 11 to 12 days.

=== Larvae ===
The early stages of the Delhi Sands flower-loving fly are specialized for a fossorial (burrowing) existence in substrates with a high sand fraction. The body shape and structures enable the larva to burrow through the sand. The head of the pupa possess a large spine that may be useful in tunneling through the soil for emergence.

=== Fly ===
Hogue (1967) described the emergence of an adult El Segundo flower-loving fly at a site in Hermosa Beach in 1965. Based on this and other observations, it appears that the pupae are located underground. Rogers and Mattom (1993) found a large number of the pupal cases of three desert species of Rhaphiomidas. In all instances, the pupal cases were found on the surface of hardened sand in open areas at least 5 feet (1.5 m) from perennial plants. When they emerge, the pupae extend only their anterior half from the soil substrate, creating distinctive emergence holes that are clearly not the burrows of other animals.

The flight season of the Delhi Sands flower-loving fly extends from early June to early September. The adults are active during the warmest portions of the day during periods of direct sunlight, generally from 10:00 am to 2:00 pm PDT. Adults have not been observed to fly during cloudy, overcast, or rainy conditions. The animals rarely fly during windy or breezy conditions, which typically occur in the afternoon. However, during these periods they have been located by disturbing the vegetation where they are perching. Ovipositing has only been observed from mid to late afternoon, between 2:00 pm and 5:00 pm, when temperatures start to cool.

=== Diet ===
Delhi Sands flower-loving flies have rarely been observed taking nectar and have not been seen taking other fluids. The nectaring events have been brief, on the order of 2–10 seconds, and have all been restricted to flowers of the California buckwheat (Eriogonum fasciculatum). The only other flowers available during the flight time are croton (Croton californicus) and telegraphweed (Heterotheca grandiflora), but visitations to these plants have not been noted.

The larvae of the Delhi Sands flower-loving fly and two other Rhaphiomidas species were held in captivity by Rogers and Mattoni. All items of food, including synthetic diets that were offered to the animals, were rejected. Rogers and Mattom reported that captive larvae refused to feed on small beetle larvae collected from the sand dunes, fruit fly larvae, or sand dune cockroach nymphs. None of the fly larvae became cannibalistic, even when starving. The larvae all died within 15 days. It remains unclear as to whether the early stages of Rhaphiomidas are herbivores, detrivores, or carnivores.

=== Predation ===
The introduced Argentine ant (Linepithema humile) was observed to attack and kill a recently emerged adult Delhi Sands flower-loving fly. Large asilid flies in the genera Proctacanthus and Promachus are known to prey upon Rhaphiomidas. Other predators of the adult flies likely include dragonflies and insectivorous birds. The early stages may be eaten by ants, subterranean predatory insects, and reptiles.

== Ecosystem description ==
The most characteristic feature of all known sites of Rhaphiomidas terminatus abdominalis is their fine sandy soils, often wholly or partly sand dunes stabilized by the sparse native vegetation. The Colton dunes are the result of sand blown from the canyons in the San Gabriel and San Bernardino Mountains by the Santa Ana winds in the fall. Over the millennia, the dunes grew to cover some 40 square miles. Santa Ana winds continue to carry sand down from the mountains, but the dune system has largely been eliminated by urban development and agricultural conversion. The Colton dune soils are generally classified as the Delhi series (primarily Delhi fine sand). Delhi series soils cover about 40 square miles in several irregular patches extending from the city of Colton to Ontario and Chino in northwestern Riverside and southwestern San Bernardino Counties.

The Delhi series soils are a biologically sensitive and very rare environment, and are inhabited by a number of plant and animal species of special concern. The region, also known as the Colton Dunes, is the largest inland sand dune formation in southern California, exclusive of the desert. The vegetation of these dunes has been defined as the Desert Sand-verbena series in Sawyer and Keeler-Wolf. Plants on the Colton Dunes include California buckwheat (Eriogonum fasciculatum), California croton (Croton californicus), deerweed (Acmispon glaber), and California evening primrose (Oenothera avita). The habitat supports several plants and animals of limited distribution, including the legless lizard (Anniella pulchra), Coast horned lizard (Phrynosoma coronatum blainviliii), Delhi Sands metalmark butterfly, Delhi Sands Jerusalem cricket, Apiocera convergens, Delhi Sands sandroach and, potentially, Pringle's monardella (Monardella pringlei).

Much of the Colton Dunes area has been used for agriculture, chiefly grapes and citrus since the 1800s. More recently, nearly all the remaining area has been used for dairies, housing tracts, and commercial/industrial sites. Most of the remaining area with restoration potential is degraded to some degree. The present distribution of the Delhi Sands flower-loving fly represents less than 2% of its former range; the habitat existing today is approximately half of what existed in 1975. Before European settlement, the Delhi Sands flower-loving fly likely occurred throughout much or all of the Colton Dunes in San Bernardino and Riverside Counties, California, an assumption that is based on the animal's biology and records of museum specimens of the Delhi Sands flower-loving fly, which extend from the eastern margin of the Delhi dunes in Colton to near its western limit in Mira Loma.

== Threats ==
The human population of California experienced especially rapid growth during the 1960s and 1970s, and it continues to grow beyond the 30 million mark. A significant portion of this growth has occurred in the San Bernardino County area. The western third of Riverside County currently contains approximately 800,000 people, which is predicted to increase to 1.4 million by 2010.

Historically, lands in San Bernardino and Riverside Counties containing Delhi series soil have been used for agriculture. Current land altering activities in this area that adversely affect the Delhi Sands flower-loving fly include surface mining for sand, and residential and commercial development. Unauthorized collecting of the Delhi Sands flower-loving fly by insect collectors is a threat to the species. Critical Habitat was not designated because of the danger posed by insect collectors. Since the animal was listed, construction of a hospital, commercial development, and dumping of cow manure and other trash have eliminated populations and restorable habitat.

=== Invasive vegetation ===
Invasive exotic vegetation severely degrades or eliminates the habitat of the Delhi Sands flower-loving fly. Non-native plants of concern include Russian thistle (Salsola tragus), horehound (Marrubium vulgare), mustard (Brassica tournefordi), cheeseweed (Malva parviflora), and many species of introduced grasses such as ripgut (Bromus diandrus) and red brome (Bromus madritensis ssp. rubens). These plants likely alter the amount of soil moisture or make the substrate physically unsuitable for the survival of the Delhi Sands flower-loving fly and other native subterranean invertebrates. The diversity and abundance of arthropods have been found to be significantly reduced or absent in coastal dune areas containing exotic plants versus areas with native vegetation.

=== Cow manure dumping ===
Tons of cow manure from local dairies have been dumped on several sites containing restorable habitat for the Delhi Sands flower-loving fly, often apparently without permission of the landowners. The manure smothers the animals, plants, and habitat where it is dumped. The manure also provides high levels of nutrients for invasive exotic plants, such as cheeseweed (Malva parviflora). The organic matter and nutrients can only be removed at large expense over a long time period. Restoration of manured sites, although possible, is of the lowest priority, even though manured sites under powerline rights-of-way would otherwise provide ideal habitat.

== Recovery units ==
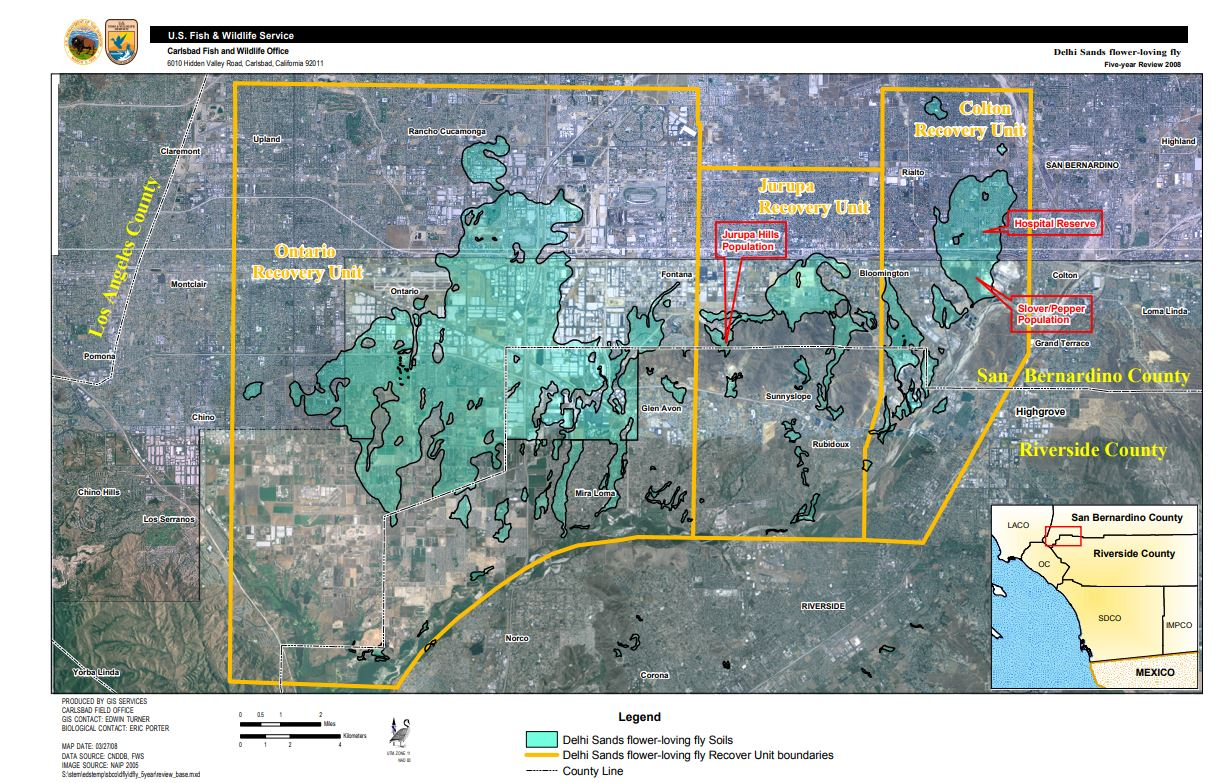
Recovery Unit Map For the Delhi Sands Flower-loving fly

Areas known to be inhabited by the Delhi Sands flower-loving fly or areas that contain restorable habitat for the animal have been grouped into three Recovery Units based on geographic proximity, similarity of habitat, and potential genetic exchange. These three recovery units are: Ontario Recovery Unit, Jurupa Recovery Unit, and Colton Recovery Unit. Each recovery unit includes occupied habitat containing one or more populations of the Delhi Sands flower-loving fly and/or restorable habitat for at least one population. The occupied and restorable habitat in the recovery units includes only those areas that contain Delhi Series soils. The distribution of historical records suggests that the fly occurred extensively throughout these three units. Note that the recovery units do not include residential and commercial development, nor areas that have otherwise been permanently altered by human actions.
