= Threatened arthropods =

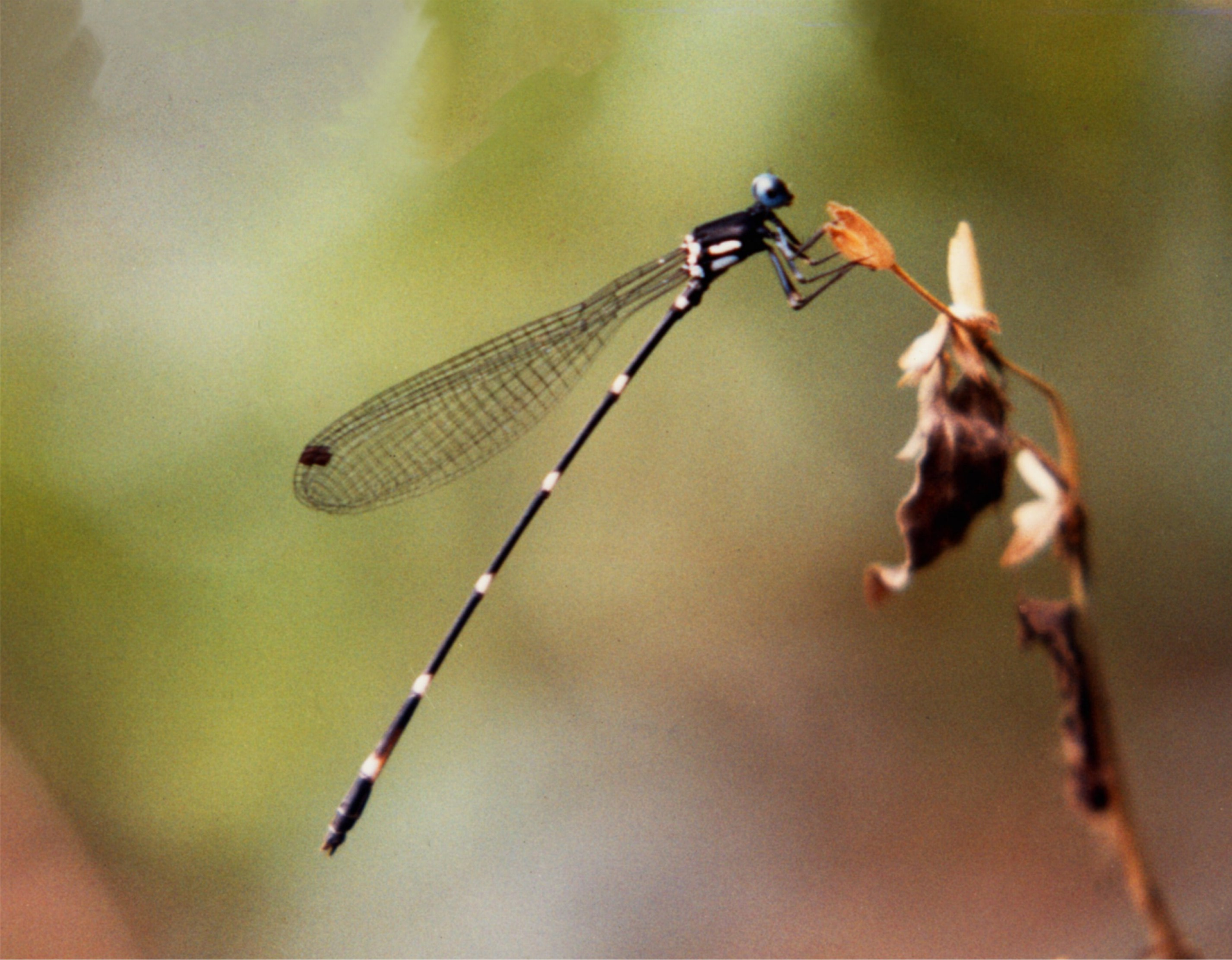
Risiocnemis seidenschwarzi, a critically endangered damselfly from the Philippines. An IUCN Red List assessment in 2009 estimated fewer than 50 mature adult individuals remained.

Threatened arthropods are defined here as any of a number of species within the phylum Arthropoda, whose extinction is likely in the foreseeable future. Estimating the number of threatened arthropod species is extremely difficult, primarily because a vast number of the species themselves are not yet named or described. Furthermore, according to Deyrup and Eisner, "The rate of destruction and degradation of natural habitats is currently so great that there are not nearly enough biologists to even catalog the arthropod species that are suddenly on the edge of extinction." In any case, independent estimates indicate that there are millions of undocumented arthropods on Earth.

Arthropods as a group have been very successful organisms on this planet, comprising over half of all the higher life forms. However the expansion of human activities has led to the demise of many arthropod species through the mechanisms of deforestation, conventional farming, slash-and-burn methods in the tropics, habitat fragmentation via urban development, excessive use of pesticides and even the success of forest fire suppression.

The social/political practice whereby a species is given a formal designation as "Endangered" or "Protected" is a different matter, called "Conservation status", and discussed elsewhere; See Endangered Species List for the United States, and IUCN Red List for international purposes. Only a tiny fraction of the planet's endangered arthropods are formally recognized as such, as no one has ever evaluated the conservation status of the vast majority of arthropod species.

== Difficulty of estimating numbers of species ==
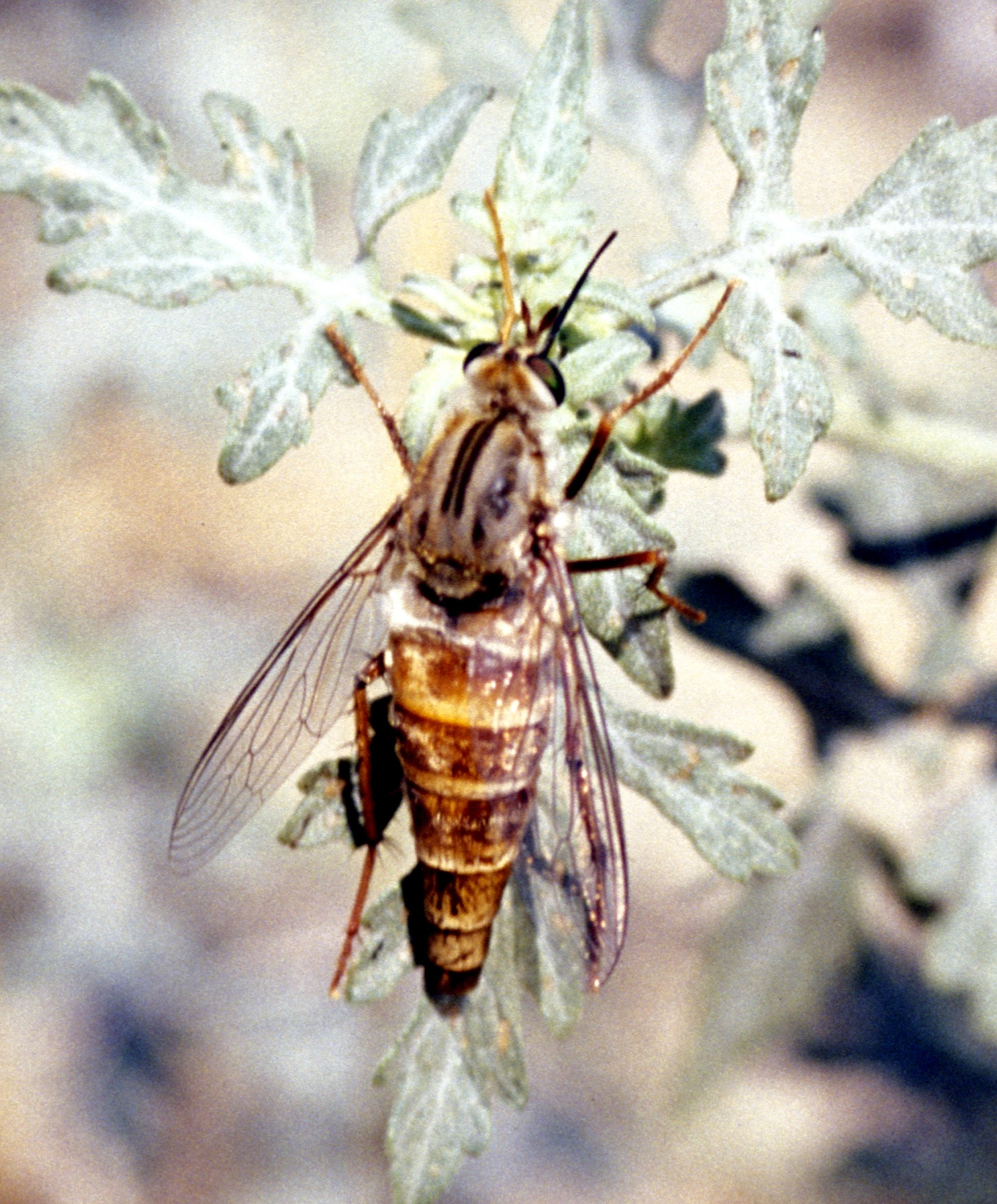
The endangered Delhi Sands flower-loving fly.

It is difficult to estimate the total number of endangered arthropod species, since many of the taxa themselves have not been recorded. For example, in North America the estimated number of insect species exceeds 163,000, of which only about two thirds are taxonomically known. An even greater discovery awaiting, over 72 percent of North American arachnids are yet to be named and described.

The total number of living arthropod species is probably in the tens of millions. One conservative estimate puts the number of arthropod species in tropical forests alone at six to nine million species. As a consequence of all of the above, most published estimates of the total number of endangered insects and arachnids are probably low by at least an order of magnitude. Conservatively at least eighty percent of all living animal species are arthropods.

== Ecological risks ==
Since arthropods constitute the majority of the faunal biomass on Earth, their role is vital to the survival of large numbers of insectivores and other animals that prey upon arthropods. This includes enormous numbers of mammals, avafauna, fishes, reptiles and amphibians; in addition, arthropods constitute the bulk of faunal pollinators, so that the survival of crops as well as millions of natural flora species depend on robust and biologically diverse arthropod populations.

The survival of diverse arthropods is essential to propagation of higher animals on the food chain, e.g. those species who prey upon the insectivores and other taxa that consume arthropods. Even if constant arthropod total biomass results after certain arthropod extinctions, the ecosystem stability is compromised by reduction in species numbers. Thus extinction of arthropods species threaten to make extinct hundreds of thousands, if not millions, of higher order birds, amphibians, reptiles and mammals.

== Mechanisms of arthropod endangerment ==
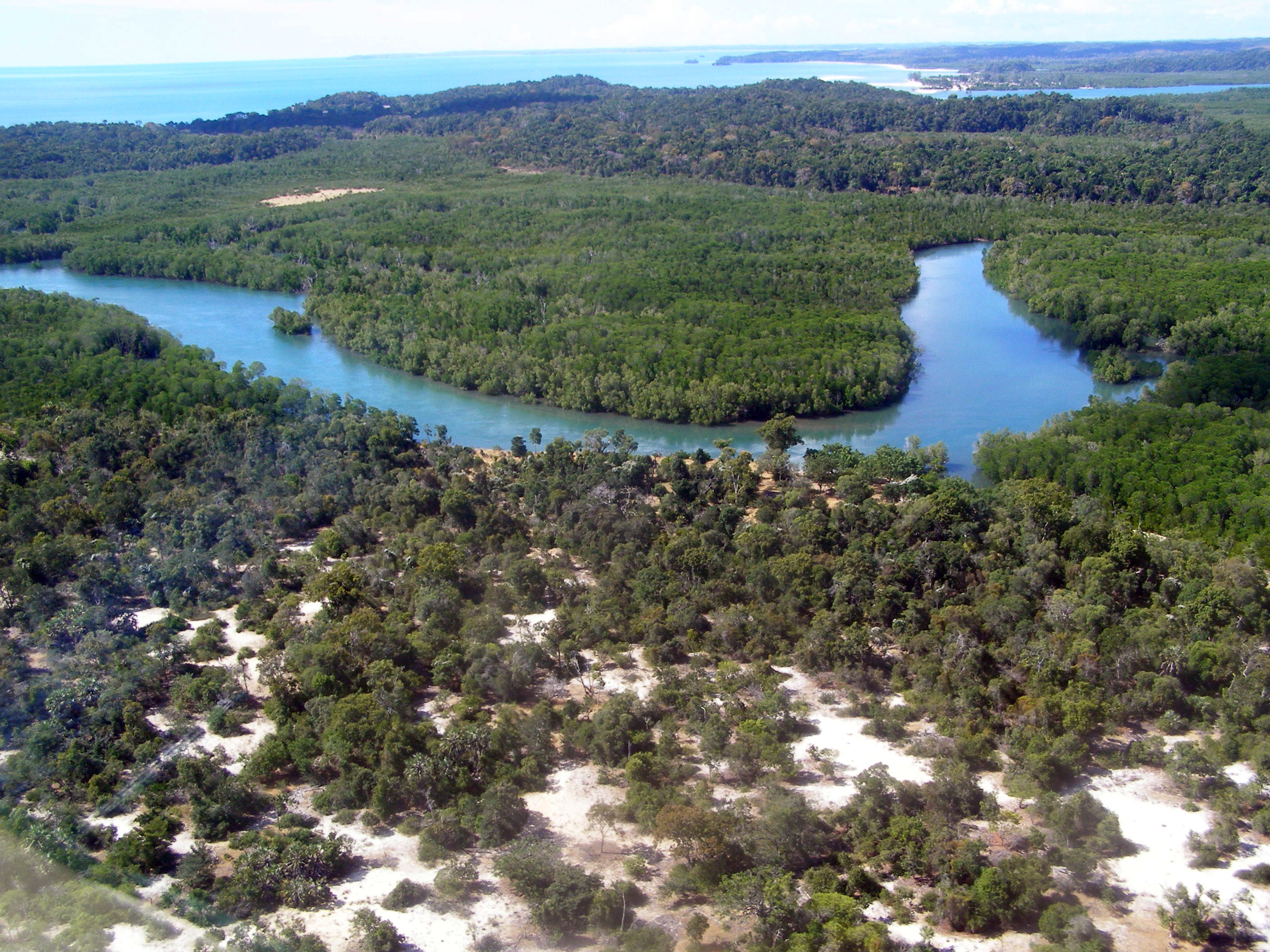
Aerial photo of the Anjajavy Forest, Madagascar which holds a number of endangered arthropods.

Most endangerment of arthropod populations is from habitat destruction by growing human populations and related human activities such as agriculture, construction and transportation.

Agriculture, in particular has a number of direct effects: a monocultures from intensive practices cannot support the biodiversity nurtured by the predecessor natural environment. Normally arthropods represent the largest number of species that are displaced by such farming. In tropical regions the major threat is slash-and-burn agricultural techniques pursued by indigenous peoples in their sometimes only available method of subsistence. Pesticide use is also a major threat to arthropod species survival. Pesticides may have an intended effect of killing specified insects in a farming environment; however, considerable pesticide applications kill unintended species by the lack of specificity of most chemical formulations; moreover, much of the insect mortality arises from pesticide runoff entering surface waters or from transporting toxic chemicals to downgradient environments.

Habitat fragmentation has special methods of endangerment beyond the amount of land consumed by the fragmenting agent. As an example, consider the construction of a highway, whose width is an effective barrier to arthropod migration. Many arthropods never migrate more than about 200 feet from their place of birth, so a freeway or dual carriageway effectively fragments many arthropod colonies such that they cannot interact. Studies have shown the greater vulnerability to extinction where habitats are fragmented.

== Example endangered arthropods ==
The following is a very small fraction of the potentially hundreds of thousands of endangered arthropods, limited to species which have been formally recognized as to their special conservation status:

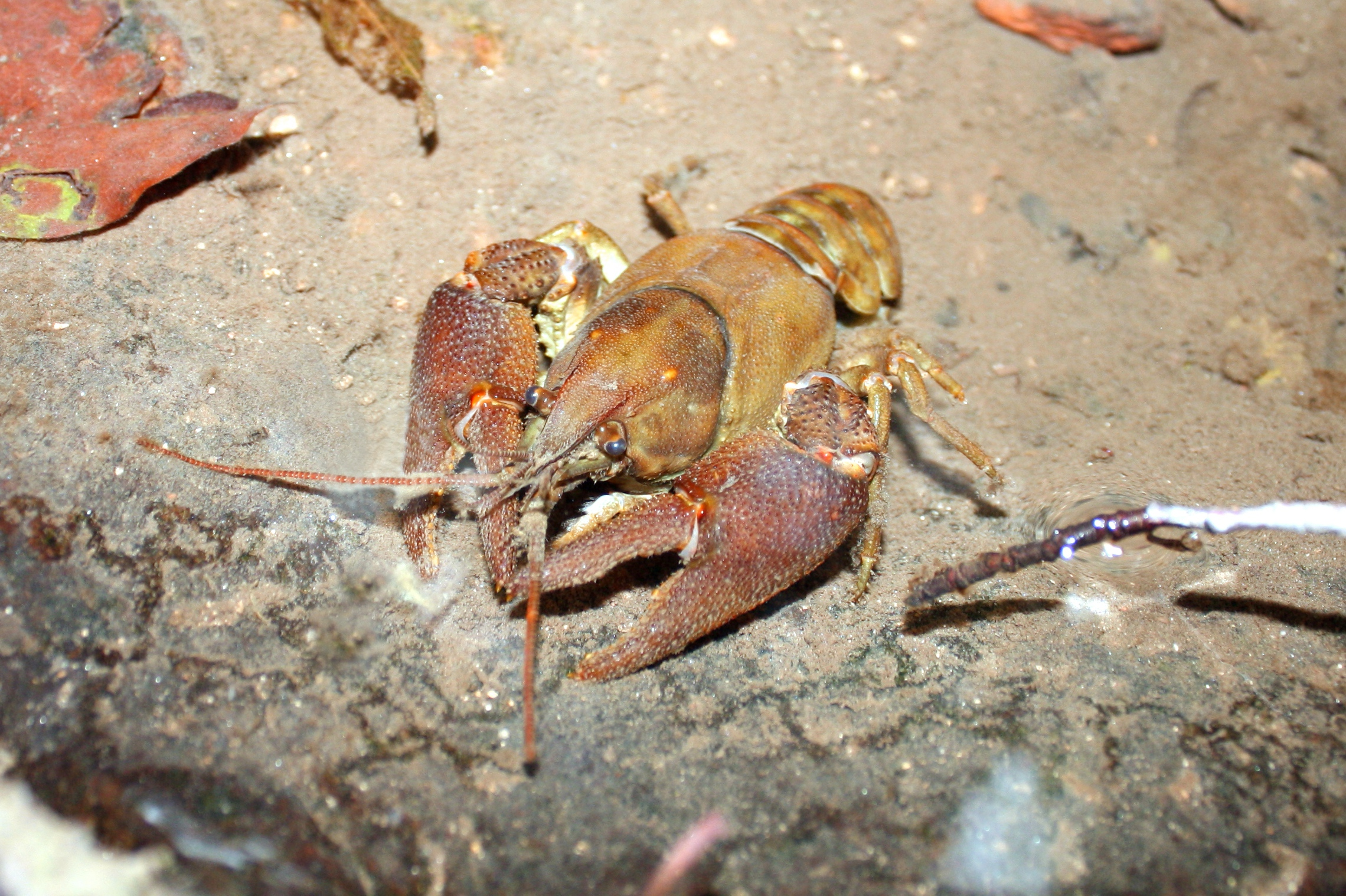
The endangered white-clawed crayfish

- Alabama cave shrimp (Palaemonias alabamae)
- California freshwater shrimp (Syncaris pacifica)
- Delhi Sands flower-loving fly (Rhaphiomidas terminatus abdominalis), due to severely limited range of habitat and development
- South African black millipedes (Doratogonus spp.), due to habitat destruction
- Kentucky cave shrimp (Palaemonias ganteri)
- Salt Creek tiger beetle (Cicindela nevadica lincolniana)
- San Bruno elfin butterfly (Incisalia mossii bayensis), due to limited range of habitat and development encroachment
- Smith's blue butterfly (Euphilotes enoptes smithidue), to human overpopulation of coastal dunes areas and associated highway and land development
- Spruce-fir moss spider (Microhexura montivaga)
- Tasmanian giant freshwater crayfish (Astacopsis gouldi)
- Tooth cave spider (Neoleptoneta myopica)
- Poecilotheria Parachute Tarantula (Poecilotheria spp)
- White-clawed crayfish (Austropotamobius pallipes)

== See also ==
- List of critically endangered arthropods
- List of endangered arthropods
- List of vulnerable arthropods
- List of near threatened arthropods
- Habitat fragmentation
- Minimum viable population
- United States Fish and Wildlife Service list of threatened and endangered arthropods
- Short-range endemic invertebrates
