= Rhaphiomidas maehleri =

Scientific classification
- Kingdom: Animalia
- Phylum: Arthropoda
- Clade: Pancrustacea
- Class: Insecta
- Order: Diptera
- Family: Mydidae
- Subfamily: Rhaphiomidinae
- Genus: Rhaphiomidas
- Species: R. maehleri

Binomial name
- Rhaphiomidas maehleri Cazier, 1941

Species of fly

Rhaphiomidas maehleri is a species of mydas flies (insects in the family Mydidae).

== Distribution ==
California.
