= Proctacanthus heros =

Scientific classification
- Kingdom: Animalia
- Phylum: Arthropoda
- Clade: Pancrustacea
- Class: Insecta
- Order: Diptera
- Family: Asilidae
- Genus: Proctacanthus
- Species: P. heros

Binomial name
- Proctacanthus heros (Wiedemann, 1828)

Synonyms
- Asilus heros Wiedemann, 1828

Species of fly

Proctacanthus heros is a species of robber flies (insects in the family Asilidae).
