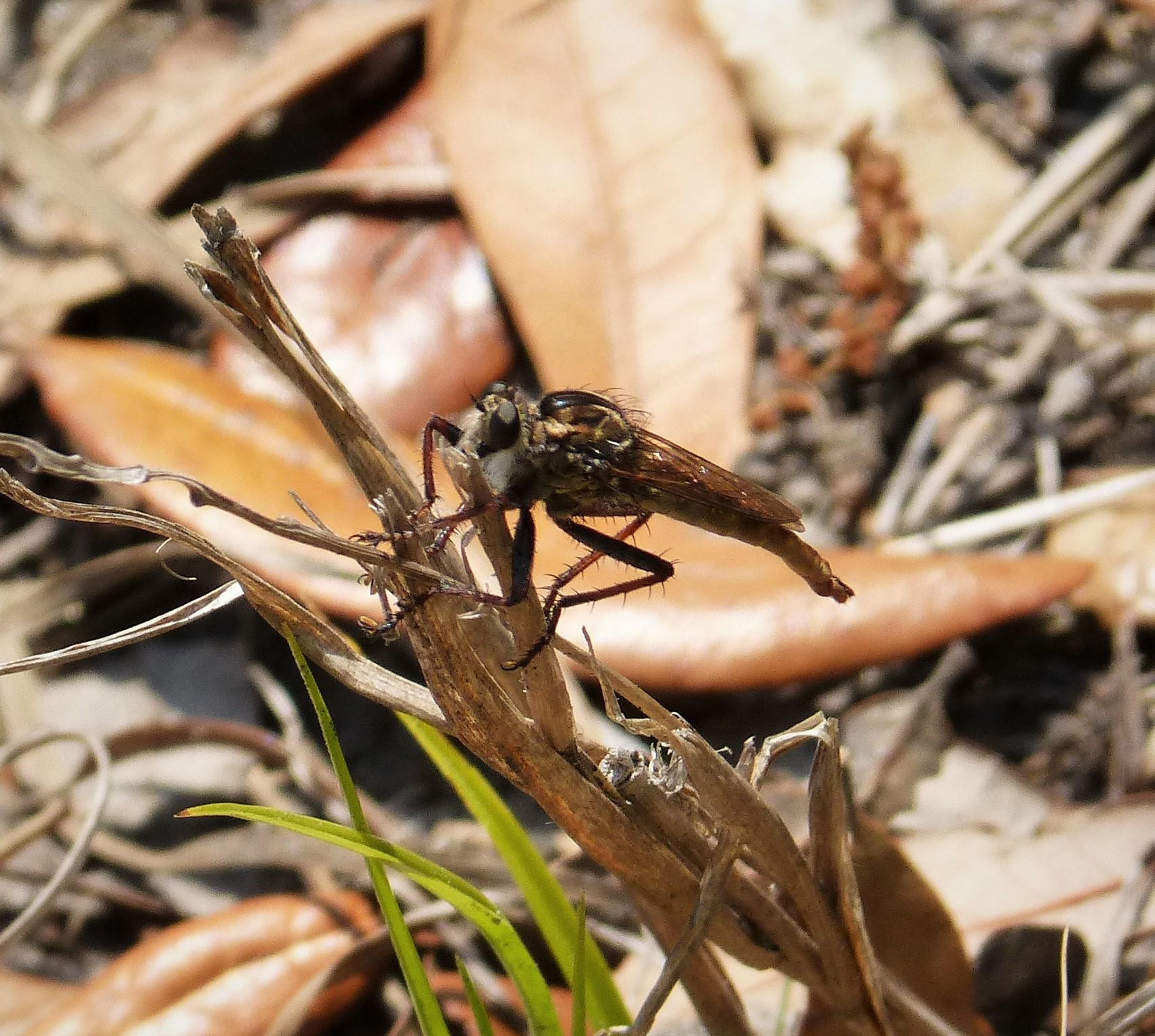

Scientific classification
- Kingdom: Animalia
- Phylum: Arthropoda
- Class: Insecta
- Order: Diptera
- Family: Asilidae
- Genus: Proctacanthus
- Species: P. milbertii

Binomial name
- Proctacanthus milbertii Macquart, 1838

Synonyms
- Asilus agrion Jaennicke, 1867; Asilus missouriensis Riley, 1870

= Proctacanthus milbertii =

Species of fly

Proctacanthus milbertii, or Milbert's proctacanthus, is a species of robber flies (insects in the family Asilidae).
