= Proctacanthus duryi =

Scientific classification
- Domain: Eukaryota
- Kingdom: Animalia
- Phylum: Arthropoda
- Class: Insecta
- Order: Diptera
- Family: Asilidae
- Genus: Proctacanthus
- Species: P. duryi

Binomial name
- Proctacanthus duryi Hine, 1911

Species of fly

Proctacanthus duryi is a species of robber flies (insects in the family Asilidae).
