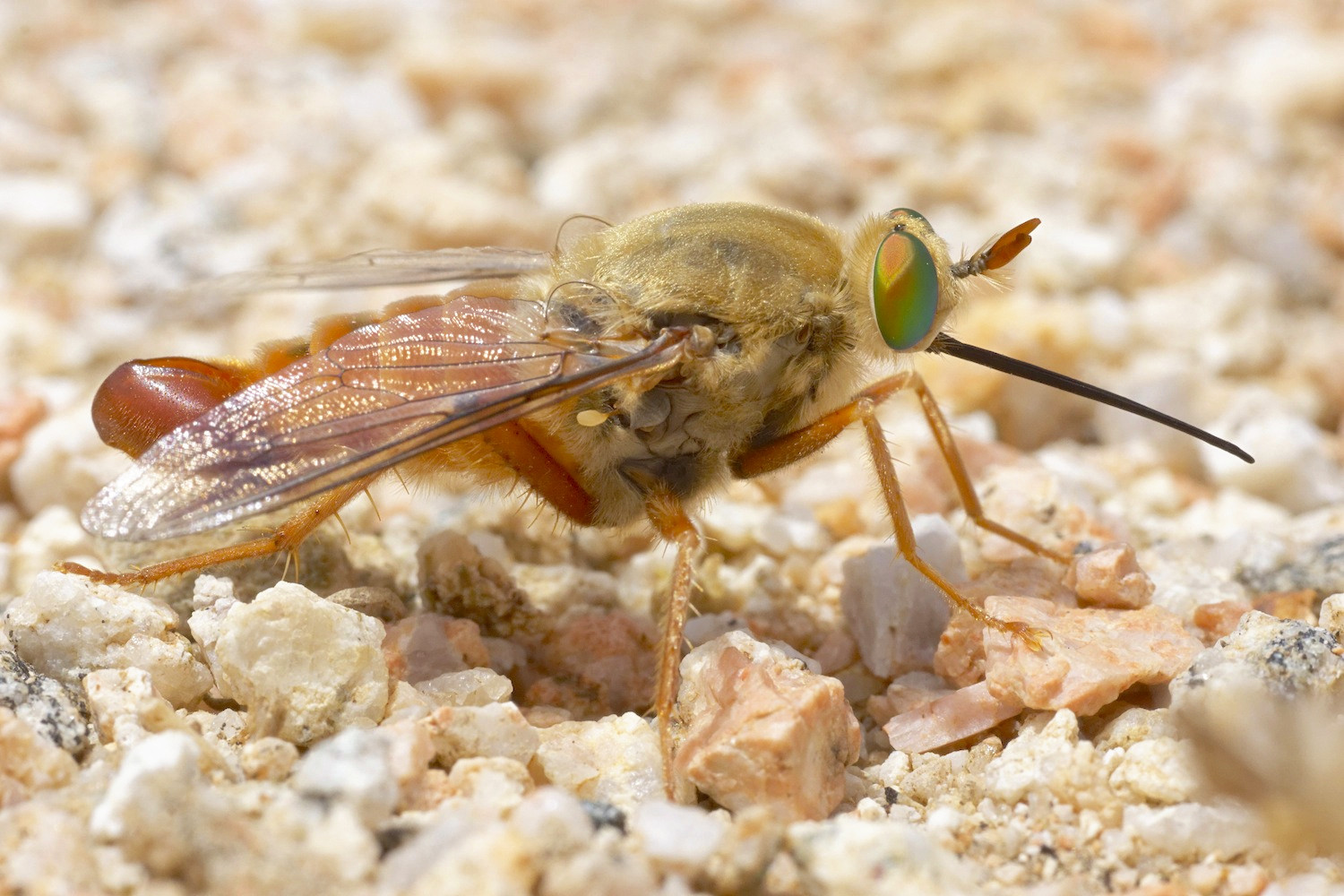

Scientific classification
- Kingdom: Animalia
- Phylum: Arthropoda
- Class: Insecta
- Order: Diptera
- Family: Mydidae
- Subfamily: Rhaphiomidinae
- Genus: Rhaphiomidas
- Species: R. acton

Binomial name
- Rhaphiomidas acton Coquillett, 1891

= Rhaphiomidas acton =

Species of fly

Rhaphiomidas acton is a species of mydas flies (insects in the family Mydidae). It has three recognized subspecies, distributed broadly across southern California.

== Subspecies ==
- Rhaphiomidas a. acton Coquillett, 1891
- Rhaphiomidas acton maculatus Cazier, 1941
- Rhaphiomidas acton maehleri Cazier, 1941
