= Proctacanthus micans =

Scientific classification
- Kingdom: Animalia
- Phylum: Arthropoda
- Class: Insecta
- Order: Diptera
- Family: Asilidae
- Genus: Proctacanthus
- Species: P. micans

Binomial name
- Proctacanthus micans Schiner, 1867

Species of fly

Proctacanthus micans is a species of robber flies (insects in the family Asilidae).
