= Rhaphiomidas nigricaudis =

Scientific classification
- Kingdom: Animalia
- Phylum: Arthropoda
- Class: Insecta
- Order: Diptera
- Family: Mydidae
- Subfamily: Rhaphiomidinae
- Genus: Rhaphiomidas
- Species: R. nigricaudis

Binomial name
- Rhaphiomidas nigricaudis

Species of fly

Rhaphiomidas nigricaudis is a species of mydas flies (insects in the family Mydidae). It is found in Arizona.
