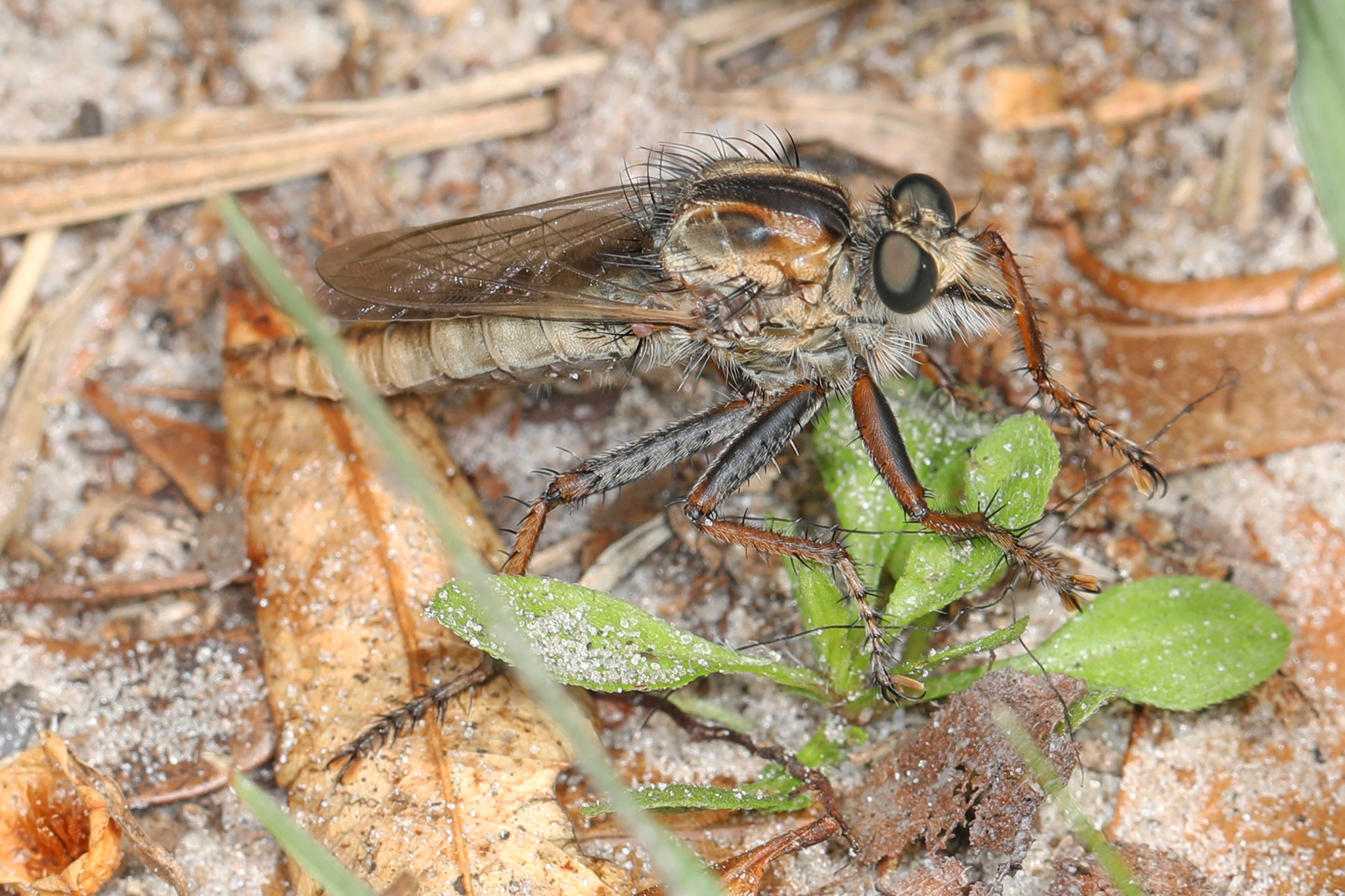
- Proctacanthus brevipennis, Florida

Scientific classification
- Domain: Eukaryota
- Kingdom: Animalia
- Phylum: Arthropoda
- Class: Insecta
- Order: Diptera
- Family: Asilidae
- Genus: Proctacanthus
- Species: P. brevipennis

Binomial name
- Proctacanthus brevipennis (Wiedemann, 1828)

Synonyms
- Asilus brevipennis Wiedemann, 1828

= Proctacanthus brevipennis =

Species of fly

Proctacanthus brevipennis is a species of robber flies (insects in the family Asilidae).
