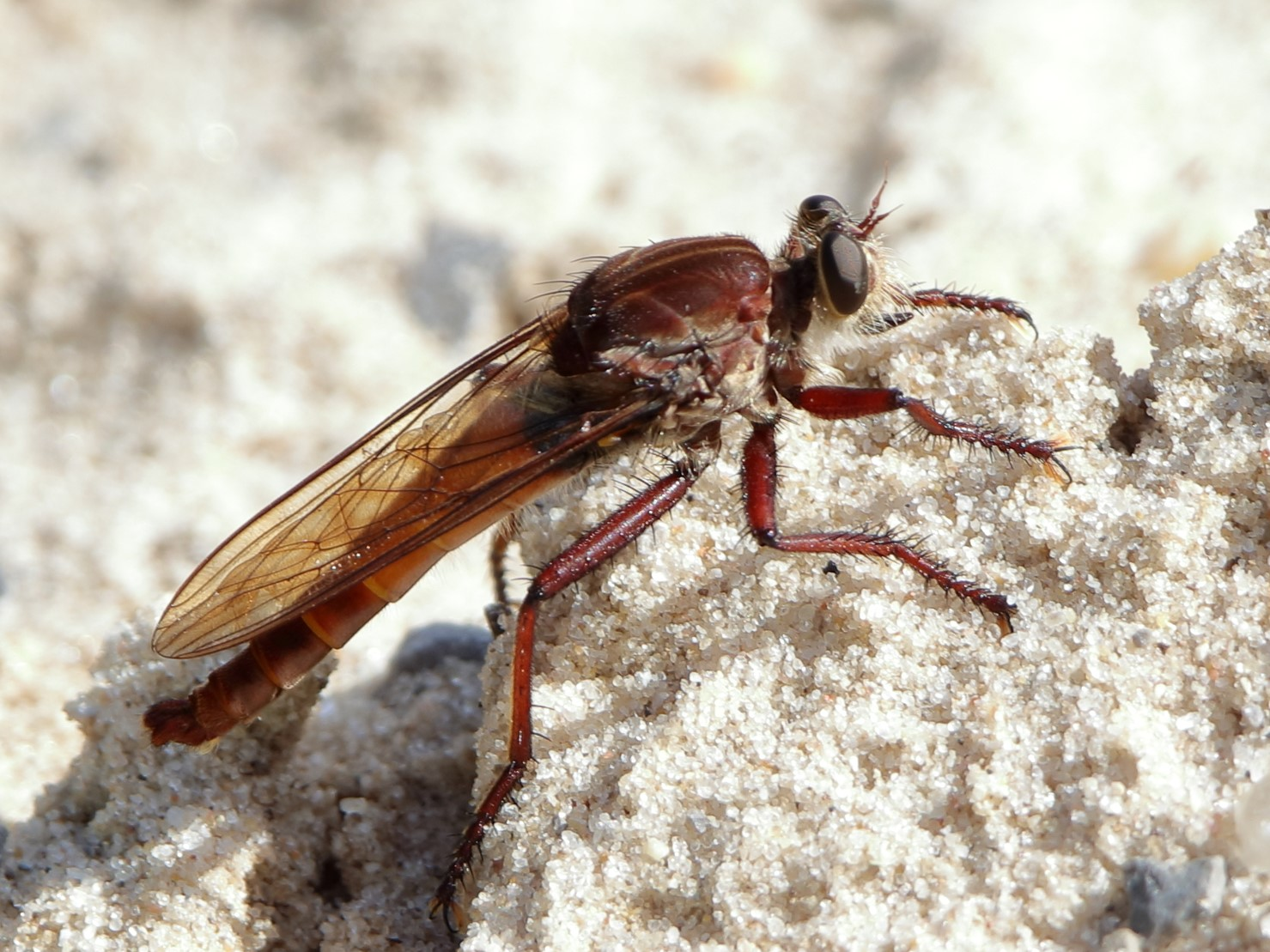

Scientific classification
- Kingdom: Animalia
- Phylum: Arthropoda
- Class: Insecta
- Order: Diptera
- Family: Asilidae
- Genus: Proctacanthus
- Species: P. rufus

Binomial name
- Proctacanthus rufus Williston, 1885

= Proctacanthus rufus =

Species of fly

Proctacanthus rufus, the eastern red-tailed marauder, is a species of robber fly in the family Asilidae.
