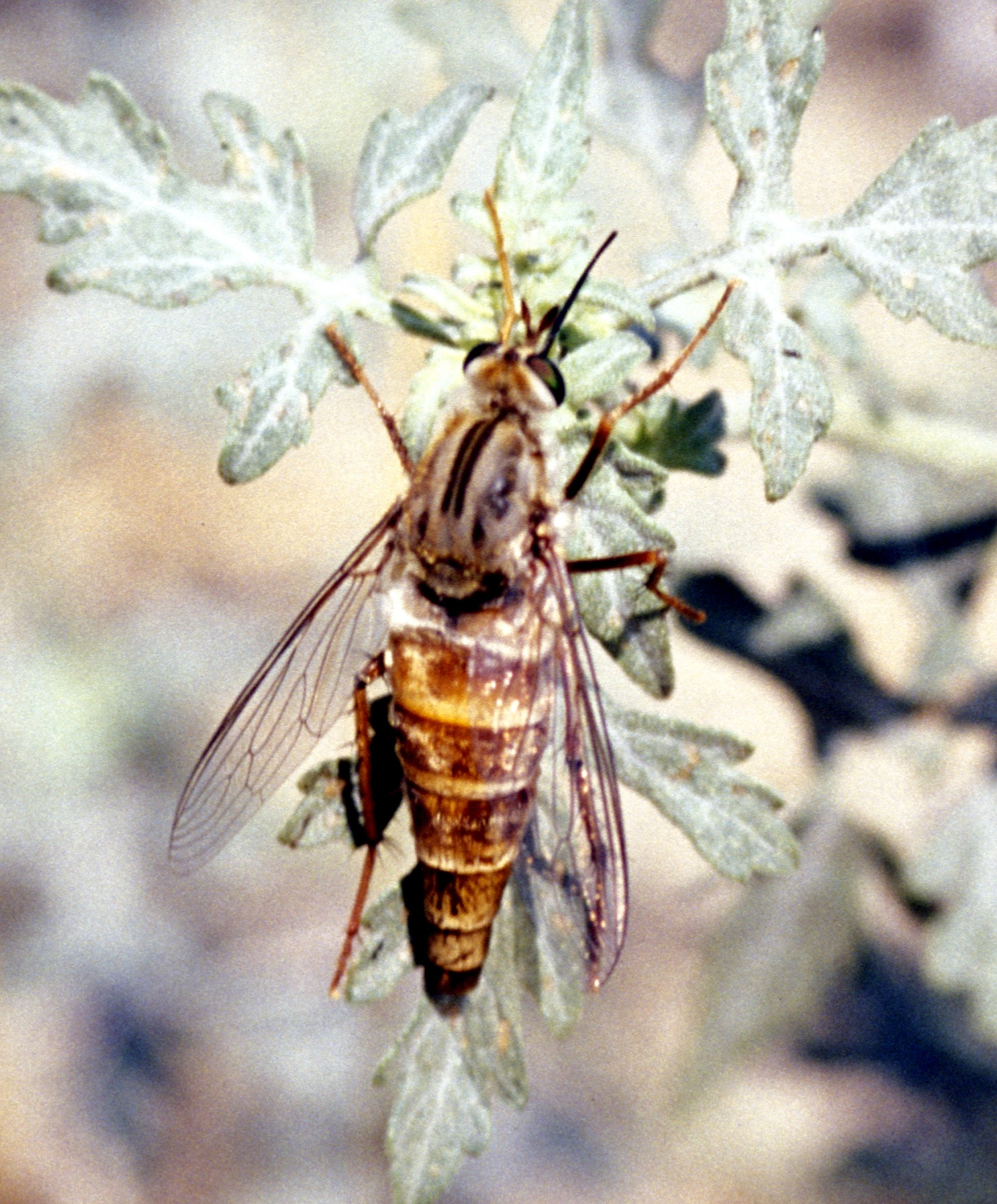
- Rhaphiomidas terminatus ssp. abdominalis

Conservation status
- Critically Imperiled (NatureServe)

Scientific classification
- Kingdom: Animalia
- Phylum: Arthropoda
- Class: Insecta
- Order: Diptera
- Family: Mydidae
- Subfamily: Rhaphiomidinae
- Genus: Rhaphiomidas
- Species: R. terminatus

Binomial name
- Rhaphiomidas terminatus Cazier, 1941

Subspecies
- Rhaphiomidas terminatus abdominalis; Rhaphiomidas terminatus terminatus

= Rhaphiomidas terminatus =

Species of fly

Rhaphiomidas terminatus, the flower-loving fly, is a species of mydas fly (insects in the family Mydidae). It is endemic to California.
