= Proctacanthus occidentalis =

Scientific classification
- Domain: Eukaryota
- Kingdom: Animalia
- Phylum: Arthropoda
- Class: Insecta
- Order: Diptera
- Family: Asilidae
- Genus: Proctacanthus
- Species: P. occidentalis

Binomial name
- Proctacanthus occidentalis (Hine, 1911)

Synonyms
- Procracanthus occidentalis Hine, 1911

Species of fly

Proctacanthus occidentalis is a species of robber flies (insects in the family Asilidae).
