= Proctacanthus gracilis =

Scientific classification
- Domain: Eukaryota
- Kingdom: Animalia
- Phylum: Arthropoda
- Class: Insecta
- Order: Diptera
- Family: Asilidae
- Genus: Proctacanthus
- Species: P. gracilis

Binomial name
- Proctacanthus gracilis Bromley, 1928

Species of fly

Proctacanthus gracilis is a species of robber flies (insects in the family Asilidae).
