= Rhaphiomidas painteri =

Scientific classification
- Kingdom: Animalia
- Phylum: Arthropoda
- Class: Insecta
- Order: Diptera
- Family: Mydidae
- Subfamily: Rhaphiomidinae
- Genus: Rhaphiomidas
- Species: R. painteri

Binomial name
- Rhaphiomidas painteri Cazier, 1941

Species of fly

Rhaphiomidas painteri is a species of mydas flies (insects in the family Mydidae).

== Distribution ==
New Mexico.
