= Proctacanthus philadelphicus =

Scientific classification
- Kingdom: Animalia
- Phylum: Arthropoda
- Class: Insecta
- Order: Diptera
- Family: Asilidae
- Genus: Proctacanthus
- Species: P. philadelphicus

Binomial name
- Proctacanthus philadelphicus Macquart, 1838

Species of fly

Proctacanthus philadelphicus, the northeastern marauder, is a species of robber flies (insects in the family Asilidae).
