= Proctacanthus longus =

Scientific classification
- Domain: Eukaryota
- Kingdom: Animalia
- Phylum: Arthropoda
- Class: Insecta
- Order: Diptera
- Family: Asilidae
- Genus: Proctacanthus
- Species: P. longus

Binomial name
- Proctacanthus longus (Wiedemann, 1821)

Synonyms
- Asilus longus Wiedemann, 1821

Species of fly

Proctacanthus longus is a species of robber flies (insects in the family Asilidae).
