= Proctacanthus rodecki =

Scientific classification
- Domain: Eukaryota
- Kingdom: Animalia
- Phylum: Arthropoda
- Class: Insecta
- Order: Diptera
- Family: Asilidae
- Genus: Proctacanthus
- Species: P. rodecki

Binomial name
- Proctacanthus rodecki James, 1933

Species of fly

Proctacanthus rodecki is a species of robber flies (insects in the family Asilidae).
