= Proctacanthus coquillettii =

Scientific classification
- Domain: Eukaryota
- Kingdom: Animalia
- Phylum: Arthropoda
- Class: Insecta
- Order: Diptera
- Family: Asilidae
- Genus: Proctacanthus
- Species: P. coquillettii

Binomial name
- Proctacanthus coquillettii Hine, 1911

Species of fly

Proctacanthus coquillettii is a species of robber flies.
