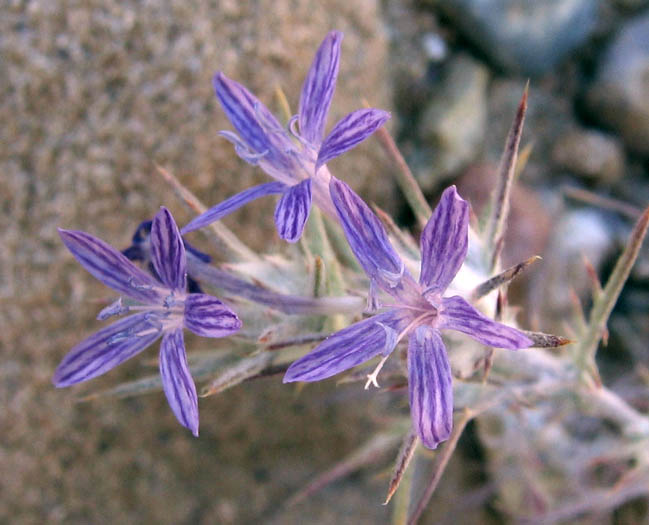

Conservation status
- Apparently Secure (NatureServe)

Scientific classification
- Kingdom: Plantae
- Clade: Tracheophytes
- Clade: Angiosperms
- Clade: Eudicots
- Clade: Asterids
- Order: Ericales
- Family: Polemoniaceae
- Genus: Eriastrum
- Species: E. densifolium

Binomial name
- Eriastrum densifolium (Benth.) H. Mason

= Eriastrum densifolium =

Species of flowering plant

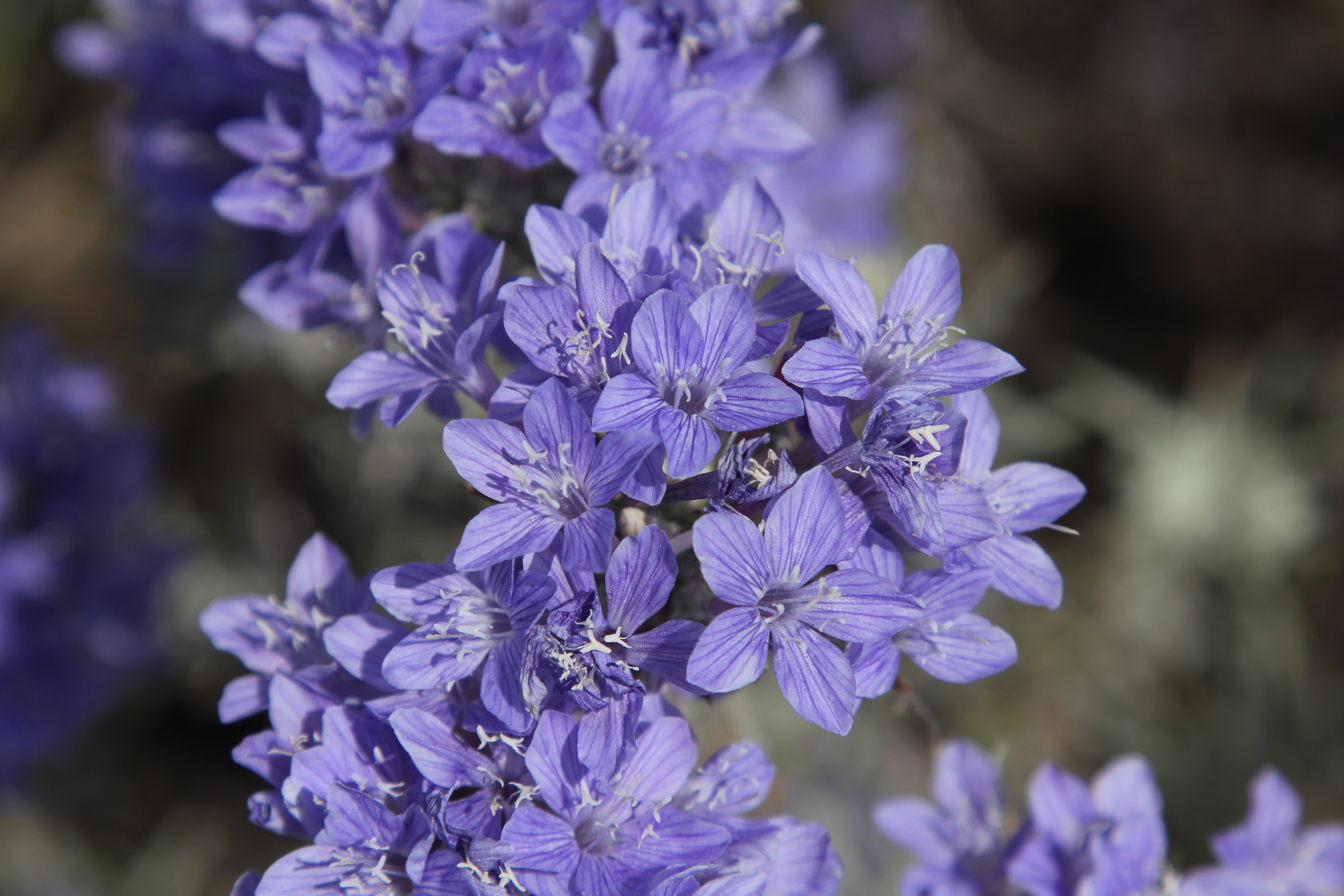
Santa Ana River woolly star (Eriastrum densifolium sanctorum)

Eriastrum densifolium is a species of flowering plant in the phlox family known by the common name giant woollystar. This wildflower is native to California and Baja California where it grows in open areas such as sand dunes and dry washes. It grows on an erect stem with slightly hairy to densely woolly foliage, often giving the plant a dark gray-green color. The leaves are narrow and spike-shaped with pointed lobes. The top of each stem is occupied by a bunched inflorescence full of woolly leaflike bracts and funnel-shaped, flat-faced flowers. The flowers are each 1 to 3 centimeters long with a face up to three or four centimeters wide. The lobes are white to bright, striking blue, sometimes with longitudinal pinstripes. The stamens protrude from the throat.

There are two subspecies of this plant. The rarer, ssp. sanctorum (Santa Ana River woollystar), is endemic to the Santa Ana River drainage in San Bernardino County, California. It was federally listed as an endangered species in 1987. A resident of higher floodplain habitat types, the plant was expected to suffer from the construction of the Seven Oaks Dam, which would alter the hydrology of the Santa Ana River waterways it depends on.
