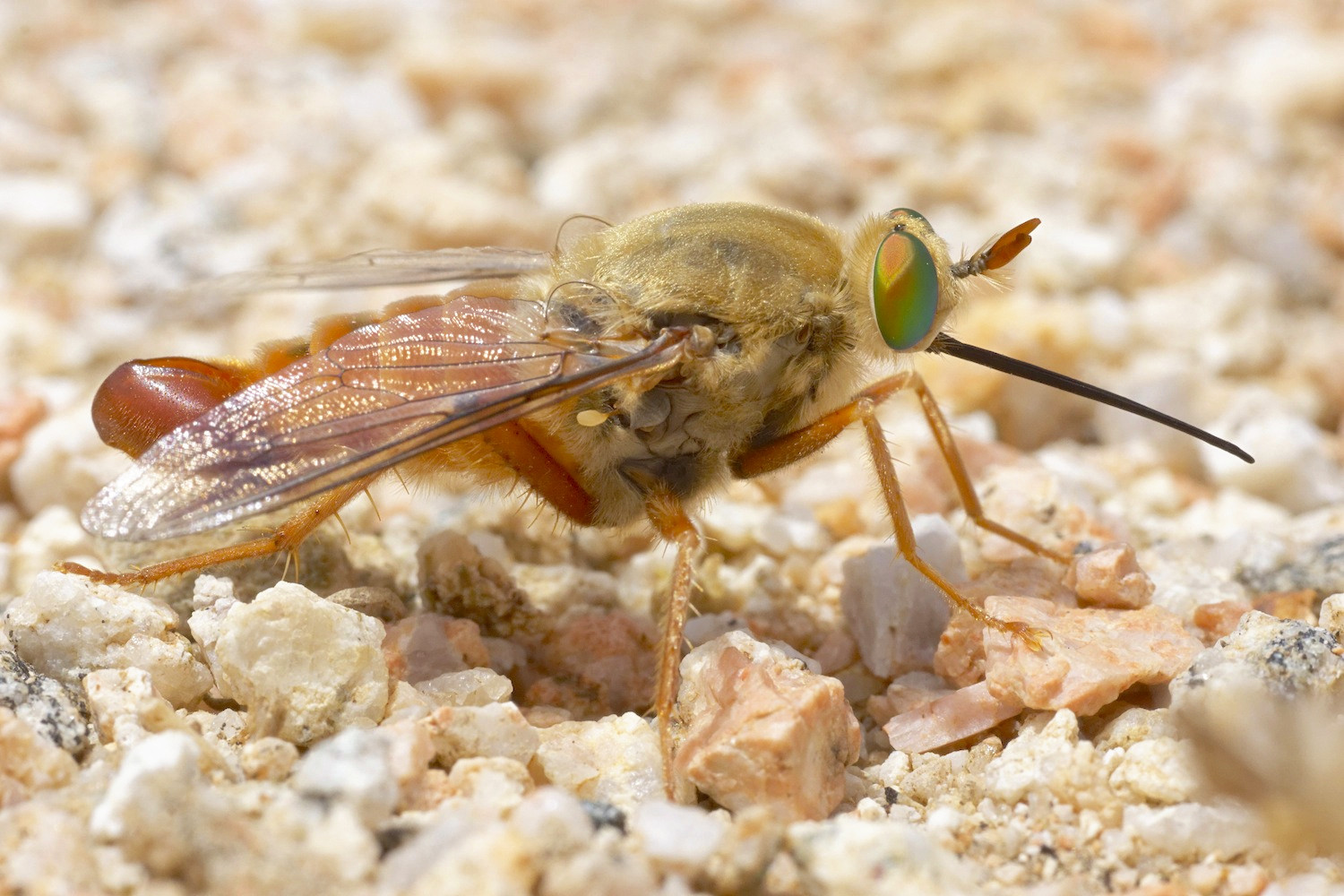
- Rhaphiomidas acton

Scientific classification
- Kingdom: Animalia
- Phylum: Arthropoda
- Class: Insecta
- Order: Diptera
- Family: Mydidae
- Subfamily: Rhaphiomidinae
- Genus: Rhaphiomidas; Osten Sacken, 1877

Type species
- Rhaphiomidas episcopus Osten Sacken, 1877

Synonyms
- Apomidas Coquillett, 1892 (Missp.); Rhaphiomydas Aldrich, 1905

= Rhaphiomidas =

Genus of flies

The mydid fly genus Rhaphiomidas contains fewer than 30 species/subspecies, all of them occurring in the desert regions of the southwestern United States and adjacent portions of northwestern Mexico. The adults are most commonly encountered in sand dune areas, and are typically only active for a few weeks each year, either in the spring or the fall; in some cases, more than one species can occur in the same dune system, but they are allochronic, each flying in different seasons. Almost nothing is known about their biology, though eggs or early instar larvae of some species are laid on the soil surface and appear to be attractive to ants, and are brought into the ant nest (it therefore seems likely that the larvae are predators of the ant brood). The restriction to sand dune areas has unfortunately led a number of these flies to the brink of extinction, especially both subspecies of R. terminatus, and the species R. trochilus. While there is only one of these on the Endangered Species List (Rhaphiomidas terminatus abdominalis, a.k.a. the "Delhi Sands Flower-loving fly"), many of the remaining taxa - including a few that have not yet been named - are gravely imperiled, as they are restricted to small geographic areas (less than 500 square miles (1,300 km^{2}), sometimes much less), rendering them extremely vulnerable to habitat loss or disturbance. These habitats are heavily targeted for development, and even if not, activities such as sand mining or motorized off-roading are common, and render the habitat unsuitable for the survival of the flies.

The family affiliation of the genus has changed fairly recently, as it had been previously placed in the family Apioceridae, or "flower-loving flies" - but, despite the transfer, the name "flower-loving flies" is nonetheless still used to refer to various species of Rhaphiomidas.

== Species ==
- Rhaphiomidas acton Coquillett, 1891
- Rhaphiomidas aitkeni Cazier, 1941
- Rhaphiomidas auratus Cazier, 1985
- Rhaphiomidas ballmeri Van Dam, 2010
- Rhaphiomidas brevirostris Cazier, 1954
- Rhaphiomidas episcopus Osten Sacken, 1877
- Rhaphiomidas forficatus Cazier, 1985
- Rhaphiomidas hasbroucki Cazier, 1985
- Rhaphiomidas hirsuticaudus Cazier, 1985
- Rhaphiomidas hoguei Rogers, 1993
- Rhaphiomidas michelbacheri Cazier, 1985
- Rhaphiomidas moapa Rogers & Van Dam, 2007
- Rhaphiomidas nigricaudis Cazier, 1985
- Rhaphiomidas pachyrhynchus Rogers & Van Dam, 2007
- Rhaphiomidas painteri Cazier, 1941
- Rhaphiomidas parkeri Cazier, 1941
- Rhaphiomidas scopaflexus Rogers, 1993
- Rhaphiomidas socorroae Cazier, 1985
- Rhaphiomidas spinicaudus Cazier, 1985
- Rhaphiomidas tarsalis Cazier, 1985
- Rhaphiomidas terminatus Cazier, 1941
- Rhaphiomidas trochilus (Coquillett, 1892)
- Rhaphiomidas undulatus Cazier, 1985
- Rhaphiomidas xanthos Townsend, 1895
