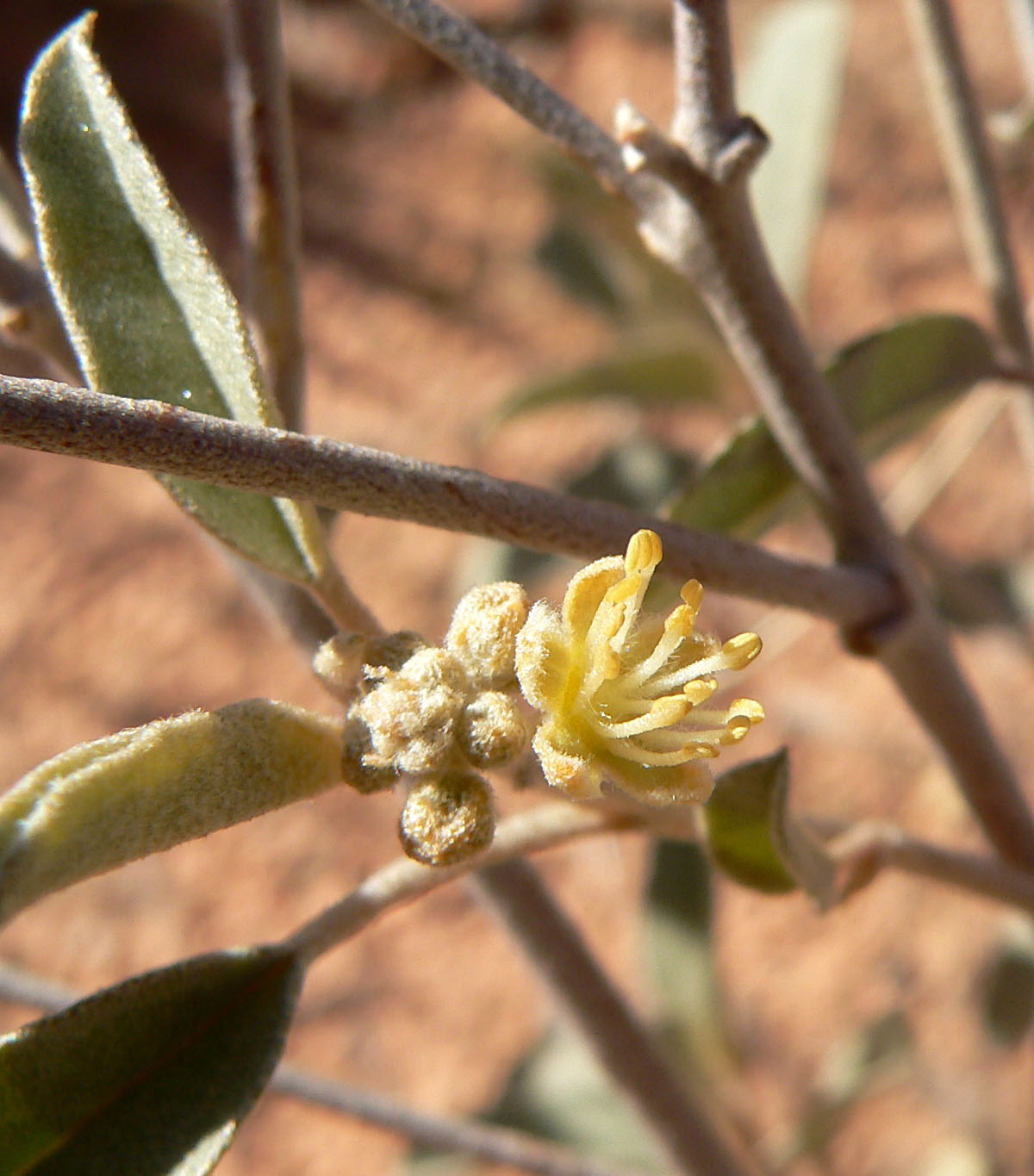
- Staminate flower

Scientific classification
- Kingdom: Plantae
- Clade: Tracheophytes
- Clade: Angiosperms
- Clade: Eudicots
- Clade: Rosids
- Order: Malpighiales
- Family: Euphorbiaceae
- Genus: Croton
- Species: C. californicus

Binomial name
- Croton californicus Muell.Arg.

= Croton californicus =

Species of flowering plant

Croton californicus is a species of croton known by the common name California croton. This plant is native to California, Nevada, Utah, Arizona, and Baja California, where it grows in the deserts and along the coastline.

This plant is a perennial or small shrub not exceeding a meter in height. The plant produces long oval-shaped leaves a few centimeters long and covered in a light-colored coat of hairs.

This species is dioecious, with individual plants bearing either male (staminate) or female (pistillate) flowers, both only a few millimeters across. The staminate flowers are tiny cups filled with thready yellowish stamens and the pistillate flowers are the rounded, lobed immature fruits surrounded by tiny pointed sepals.
