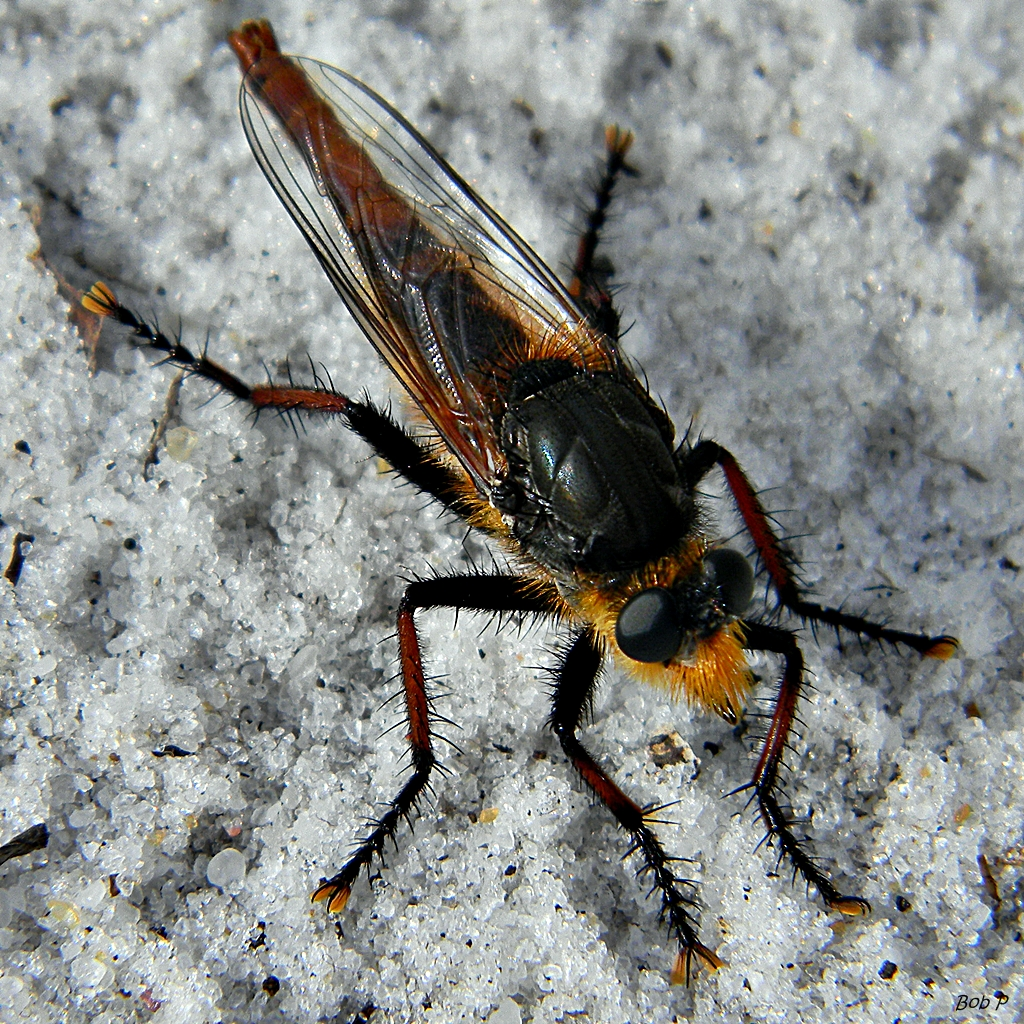
- Proctacanthus fulviventris

Scientific classification
- Kingdom: Animalia
- Phylum: Arthropoda
- Class: Insecta
- Order: Diptera
- Family: Asilidae
- Subfamily: Asilinae
- Genus: Proctacanthus; Macquart, 1838

= Proctacanthus =

Genus of flies

Proctacanthus is a genus of robber flies (insects in the family Asilidae). There are about 18 described species in Proctacanthus.

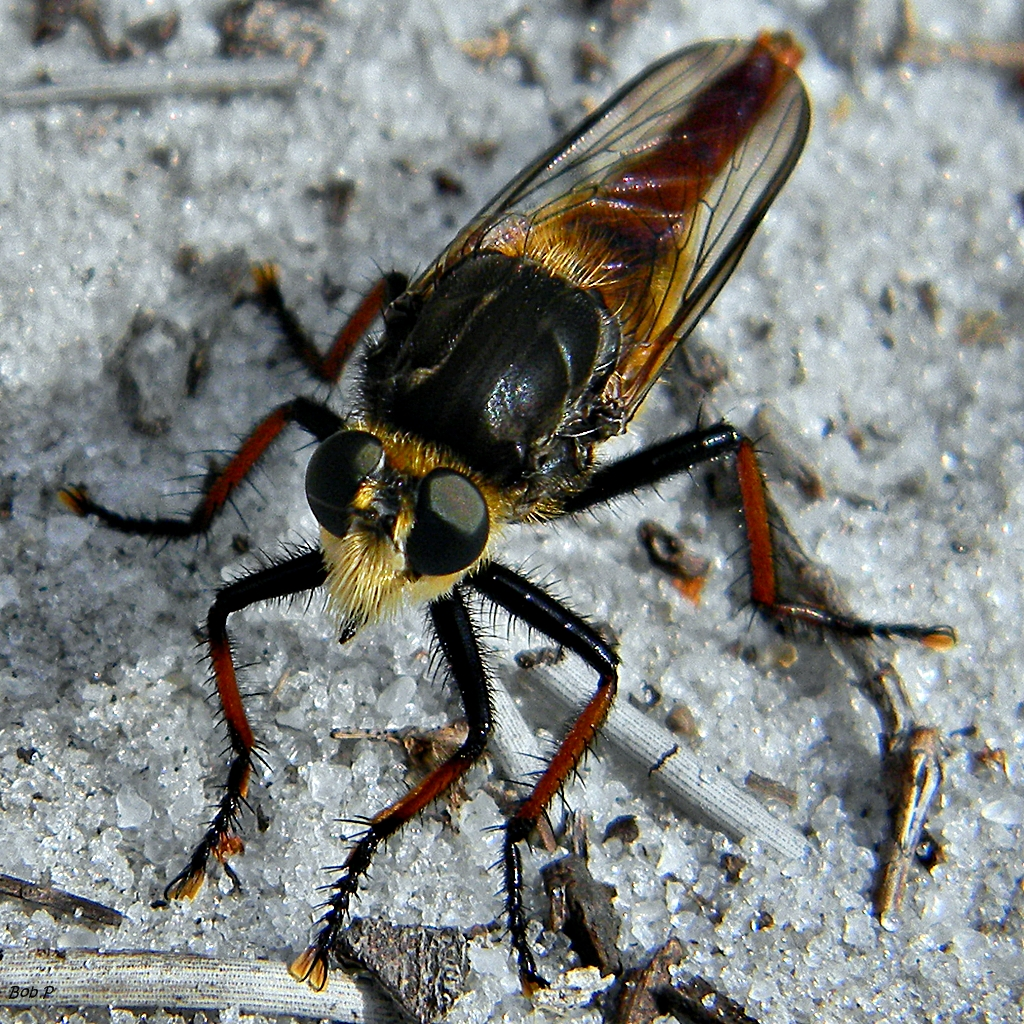
Proctacanthus fulviventris Proctacanthus sp. and victim (Hetaerina sp.).

== Species ==
- Proctacanthus brevipennis (Wiedemann, 1828)
- Proctacanthus coquillettii Hine, 1911
- Proctacanthus distinctus (Wiedemann, 1828)
- Proctacanthus duryi Hine, 1911
- Proctacanthus fulviventris Macquart, 1850
- Proctacanthus gracilis Bromley, 1928
- Proctacanthus heros (Wiedemann, 1828)
- Proctacanthus hinei Bromley, 1928
- Proctacanthus longus (Wiedemann, 1821)
- Proctacanthus micans Schiner, 1867
- Proctacanthus milbertii Macquart, 1838 (Milbert's proctacanthus)
- Proctacanthus nearno Martin, 1962
- Proctacanthus nigriventris Macquart, 1838
- Proctacanthus nigrofemoratus Hine, 1911
- Proctacanthus occidentalis (Hine, 1911)
- Proctacanthus philadelphicus Macquart, 1838
- Proctacanthus rodecki James, 1933
- Proctacanthus rufus Williston, 1885
