= List of Asilidae genera =

This is a list of genera in the family Asilidae, robber flies.

== Extant genera ==
- Ablautus Loew, 1866^{i c g b}
- Abrophila ^{c g}
- Acasilus ^{c g}
- Acnephalomyia Londt, 2010^{g}
- Acnephalum ^{c g}
- Acrochordomerus ^{c g}
- Acronyches ^{c g}
- Aczelia ^{c g}
- Adelodus ^{c g}
- Afganopogon ^{c g}
- Afroepitriptus ^{c g}
- Afroestricus ^{c g}
- Afroholopogon ^{c g}
- Afromelittodes ^{c g}
- Afromochtherus ^{c g}
- Afromosia
- Afroscleropogon ^{c g}
- Agrostomyia ^{c g}
- Aireina
- Akatiomyia Londt, 2013^{g}
- Albibarbefferia Artigas & Papavero, 1997^{g}
- Albicoma ^{c g}
- Alcimus ^{c g}
- Allopogon
- Alvarenga (fly) ^{c g}
- Alyssomyia ^{c g}
- Amathomyia ^{i c g}
- Amblyonychus ^{i c g}
- Ammodaimon ^{c g}
- Ammophilomima ^{c g}
- Amorimius ^{c g}
- Amphisbetetus ^{c g}
- Anacinaces ^{c g}
- Anarmostus ^{c g}
- Anarolius ^{c g}
- Anasillomos ^{c g}
- Ancylorhynchus ^{c g}
- Andrenosoma Rondani, 1856^{i c g b}
- Aneomochtherus ^{c g}
- Anisopogon ^{c g}
- Annamyia ^{c g}
- Anoplothyrea ^{c g}
- Antilophonotus ^{c g}
- Antipalus Loew, 1849^{g}
- Antiphrisson ^{c g}
- Antiscylaticus Londt, 2010^{g}
- Anypodetus ^{c g}
- Apachekolos Martin, 1957^{i c g b}
- Aphamartania ^{c g}
- Aphestia ^{c g}
- Aphistina ^{c g}
- Aphractia (Homonym)
- Aplestobroma ^{c g}
- Apoclea ^{c g}
- Apolastauroides ^{c g}
- Apothechyla ^{c g}
- Apotinocerus ^{c g}
- Apoxyria ^{c g}
- Araiopogon ^{c g}
- Araucopogon
- Araujoa ^{c g}
- Archilaphria ^{c g}
- Archilestris Loew, 1874^{i c g b}
- Archilestroides ^{c g}
- Argillemisca ^{c g}
- Argyrochira ^{c g}
- Argyropogon ^{c g}
- Aridefferia Artigas & Papavero, 1997^{g}
- Aristofolia ^{c g}
- Artigasus
- Asilella ^{c g}
- Asilus ^{i c g b}
- Asiola ^{c g}
- Aspidopyga ^{c g}
- Astochia ^{c g}
- Astylopogon ^{c g}
- Aterpogon ^{c g}
- Atomosia Macquart, 1838^{i c g b}
- Atoniomyia Hermann, 1912^{i g b}
- Atractia ^{c g}
- Atractocoma ^{c g}
- Austenmyia ^{c g}
- Austrosaropogon ^{c g}
- Aymarasilus ^{c g}
- Backomyia Wilcox & Martin, 1957^{i c g b}
- Bactria ^{c g}
- Bamwardaria ^{c g}
- Bana ^{c g}
- Bathropsis ^{c g}
- Bathypogon ^{c g}
- Beameromyia Martin, 1957^{i c g b}
- Blepharepium Rondani, 1848^{i c g b}
- Blepharotes ^{c g}
- Bohartia ^{i c g}
- Borapisma ^{c g}
- Brachyrhopala ^{c g}
- Brevirostrum ^{c g}
- Bromleyus ^{i c g}
- Bromotheres ^{c g}
- Broticosia ^{c g}
- Cabasa ^{c g}
- Caenarolia ^{c g}
- Callinicus Loew, 1872^{i c g b}
- Carinefferia Artigas & Papavero, 1997^{g}
- Carreraomyia ^{c g}
- Cenochromyia ^{c g}
- Centrolaphria ^{c g}
- Ceraturgus Rondani, 1856^{i c g b}
- Cerdistus ^{c g}
- Cerotainia Schiner, 1866^{i c g b}
- Cerotainiops Curran, 1930^{i c g b}
- Cerozodus ^{c g}
- Chilesus ^{c g}
- Choerades ^{c g}
- Chryseutria ^{c g}
- Chrysopogon ^{c g}
- Chrysotriclis ^{c g}
- Chylophaga ^{c g}
- Chymedax ^{c g}
- Clariola ^{c g}
- Clephydroneura ^{c g}
- Cleptomyia ^{c g}
- Clinopogon ^{c g}
- Cnodalomyia ^{c g}
- Cochleariocera ^{c g}
- Codula ^{c g}
- Coleomyia Wilcox & Martin, 1935^{i c g b}
- Colepia ^{c g}
- Comantella Curran, 1923^{i c g b}
- Coneccaplypsis ^{g}
- Congomochtherus ^{c g}
- Connomyia ^{c g}
- Conosiphon ^{c g}
- Cophinopoda ^{c g}
- Cophura Osten-Sacken, 1887^{i c g b}
- Cormansis ^{c g}
- Corymyia ^{c g}
- Craspedia Macquart, 1839^{g}
- Cratolestes ^{c g}
- Cratopoda ^{c g}
- Creolestes ^{c g}
- Crobilocerus ^{c g}
- Cryptomerinx ^{c g}
- Ctenodontina ^{c g}
- Ctenota ^{c g}
- Cyanonedys ^{c g}
- Cyclosocerus ^{c g}
- Cylicomera ^{c g}
- Cyphomyiactia ^{c g}
- Cyphotomyia ^{c g}
- Cyrtophrys ^{c g}
- Cyrtopogon Loew, 1847^{i c g b}
- Dakinomyia ^{c g}
- Damalina ^{c g}
- Damalis ^{c g}
- Danomyia ^{c g}
- Daptolestes ^{c g}
- Dasophrys ^{c g}
- Daspletis ^{c g}
- Dasycyrton ^{c g}
- Dasylechia Williston, 1907^{i c g b}
- Dasyllina ^{c g}
- Dasyllis ^{c g}
- Dasypecus ^{c g}
- Dasypogon ^{c g}
- Deromyia ^{c g}
- Despotiscus ^{c g}
- Dichaetothyrea ^{c g}
- Dicolonus Loew, 1866^{i c g b}
- Dicranus ^{i c g}
- Dicropaltum Martin, 1975^{i c g b}
- Dikowmyia ^{c g}
- Dinozabrus ^{c g}
- Dioctobroma ^{c g}
- Dioctria Meigen, 1803^{i c g b}
- Diogmites Loew, 1866^{i c g b} (hanging-thieves)
- Diplosynapsis Enderlein, 1914^{g}
- Dissmeryngodes ^{c g}
- Dogonia ^{c g}
- Dolopus ^{c g}
- Dysclytus ^{c g}
- Dysmachus ^{c g}
- Eccoptopus ^{c g}
- Eccritosia Schiner, 1866^{i c g b}
- Echthistus ^{c g}
- Echthodopa Loew, 1866^{i c g b}
- Eclipsis ^{c g}
- Efferia Coquillett, 1893^{i c g b}
- Eicherax ^{c g}
- Eichoichemus ^{c g}
- Emphysomera Schiner, 1866^{g}
- Empodiodes ^{c g}
- Engelepogon ^{c g}
- Enigmomorphus ^{c g}
- Epaphroditus ^{c g}
- Epiblepharis ^{c g}
- Epiklisis ^{c g}
- Epipamponeurus ^{c g}
- Epitriptus ^{c g}
- Erax ^{c g}
- Eraxasilus ^{c g}
- Erebunus ^{c g}
- Eremisca ^{c g}
- Eremodromus ^{c g}
- Eremomyia Artigas, 1970^{g}
- Eremonotus ^{c g}
- Eretomyia ^{c g}
- Ericomyia
- Eriopogon ^{c g}
- Erythropogon ^{c g}
- Esatanas ^{c g}
- Eucyrtopogon Curran, 1923^{i c g b}
- Eudioctria Wilcox & Martin, 1941^{i c g b}
- Eumecosoma ^{c g}
- Eurhabdus ^{c g}
- Euscelidia ^{c g}
- Eutolmus ^{c g}
- Filiolus ^{c g}
- Fishermyia Londt, 2012^{g}
- Furcilla ^{i}
- Galactopogon ^{c g}
- Gerrolasius ^{c g}
- Gibbasilus ^{c g}
- Glaphyropyga ^{c g}
- Glyphotriclis ^{c g}
- Goneccalypsis ^{c g}
- Gongromyia ^{c g}
- Gonioscelis ^{c g}
- Grajahua ^{c g}
- Graptostylus ^{c g}
- Grypoctonus ^{c g}
- Gymnotriclis ^{c g}
- Habropogon ^{c g}
- Hadrokolos Martin, 1959^{i c g b}
- Haplopogon Engel, 1930^{i c g b}
- Haroldia ^{c g}
- Harpagobroma ^{c g}
- Heligmoneura ^{g}
- Heligmonevra ^{c g}
- Helolaphyctis ^{c g}
- Hermannomyia ^{c g}
- Heteropogon Loew, 1847^{i c g b}
- Hexameritia ^{c g}
- Hippomachus Engel, 1927^{g}
- Hodites ^{c g}
- Hodophylax James, 1933^{i c g b}
- Holcocephala Jaennicke, 1867^{i c g b}
- Holopheromerus ^{g}
- Holopogon Kom. & Nevski, 1935^{i c g b}
- Hoplistomerus ^{c g}
- Hoplopheromerus ^{c g}
- Hoplotriclis ^{c g}
- Hullia ^{c g}
- Hybozelodes ^{c g}
- Hynirhynchus ^{c g}
- Hypenetes ^{c g}
- Hyperechia ^{c g}
- Hystrichopogon ^{c g}
- Icariomima ^{c g}
- Ichneumolaphria ^{c g}
- Illudium ^{c g}
- Iranopogon ^{c g}
- Irwinomyia ^{c g}
- Ischiolobos ^{c g}
- Itolia Wilcox, 1936^{i c g b}
- Ivettea
- Joartigasia ^{c g}
- Jothopogon ^{c g}
- Juxtasilus ^{c}
- Katharma ^{c g}
- Katharmacercus
- Ktyr ^{c g}
- Ktyrimisca ^{c g}
- Kurzenkoiellus
- Labarus ^{c g}
- Labromyia ^{c g}
- Lagodias ^{c g}
- Lagynogaster ^{c g}
- Laloides ^{c g}
- Lampria Macquart, 1838^{i c g b}
- Lamprozona ^{c g}
- Lamyra ^{c g}
- Laphria Meigen, 1803^{i c g b} (bee-like robber flies)
- Laphygmolestes ^{c g}
- Laphystia Loew, 1847^{i c g b}
- Laphystotes ^{c g}
- Lapystia ^{c g}
- Lasiocnemus ^{c g}
- Lasiopogon Loew, 1847^{i c g b}
- Lastaurax ^{c g}
- Lastaurina ^{c g}
- Lastauroides ^{c g}
- Lastauropsis ^{c g}
- Lastaurus ^{c g}
- Laxenecera ^{c g}
- Lecania ^{c g}
- Leinendera ^{c g}
- Leptarthrus ^{c g}
- Leptochelina ^{c g}
- Leptogaster Meigen, 1803^{i c g b}
- Leptoharpacticus ^{c g}
- Leptopteromyia Williston, 1907^{i c g b}
- Lestomyia Williston, 1883^{i c g b}
- Lestophonax ^{c g}
- Lissoteles ^{c g}
- Lithoecisus ^{c g}
- Lobus ^{c g}
- Lochmorhynchus ^{c g}
- Lochyrus ^{c g}
- Loewinella ^{c g}
- Lonchodogonus ^{c g}
- Longivena Vieira & Rafael, 2014^{g}
- Lophonotus Macquart, 1838^{g}
- Lophopeltis Engel, 1925^{g}
- Lycomya ^{c g}
- Lycoprosopa ^{c g}
- Lycosimyia ^{c g}
- Lycostommyia ^{c g}
- Macahyba ^{c g}
- Machimus Loew, 1849^{i c g b}
- Macroetra ^{c g}
- Mactea ^{c g}
- Maira ^{c g}
- Mallophora Macquart, 1838^{i c g b} (bee killers)
- Martinomyia ^{c g}
- Martintella ^{c g}
- Mauropteron ^{c g}
- Megadrillus ^{c g}
- Megalometopon ^{c g}
- Megaphorus Bigot, 1857^{i c g b}
- Megapoda ^{c g}
- Megonyx ^{c g}
- Meliponomima ^{c g}
- Melouromyia ^{c g}
- Mercuriana ^{c g}
- Merodontina ^{c g}
- Mesoleptogaster ^{c g}
- Metadioctria Wilcox & Martin, 1941^{i c g b}
- Metalaphria ^{c g}
- Metapogon Coquillett, 1904^{i c g b}
- Michotamia ^{c g}
- Microphontes ^{c g}
- Microstylum Macquart, 1838^{i c g b}
- Millenarius ^{c g}
- Minicatus ^{c g}
- Mirolestes ^{c g}
- Molobratia ^{c g}
- Myaptex ^{c g}
- Myelaphus Bigot, 1882^{i c g b}
- Nannocyrtopogon Wilcox & Martin, 1936^{i c g b}
- Nannolaphria ^{c g}
- Negasilus Curran, 1934^{i c g b}
- Neoaratus ^{c g}
- Neocerdistus ^{c g}
- Neocyrtopogon ^{c g}
- Neoderomyia ^{c g}
- Neodioctria ^{c g}
- Neodiogmites ^{c g}
- Neodysmachus ^{c g}
- Neoepitriptus Lehr, 1992^{g}
- Neoholopogon ^{c g}
- Neoitamus Osten Sacken, 1878^{i c g b}
- Neolaparus ^{c g}
- Neolophonotus ^{c g}
- Neomochtherus Osten Sacken, 1878^{i c g b}
- Neophoneus ^{c g}
- Neosaropogon ^{c g}
- Neoscleropogon ^{c g}
- Nerax Hull, 1962^{g}
- Nerterhaptomenus ^{c g}
- Nesotes ^{c g}
- Nevadasilus ^{b}
- Nicocles Jaennicke, 1867^{i c g b}
- Nomomyia ^{c g}
- Nothopogon ^{c g}
- Notiolaphria ^{c g}
- Notomochtherus ^{c g}
- Nusa ^{c g}
- Nyssomyia ^{c g}
- Nyssoprosopa ^{c g}
- Nyximyia ^{c g}
- Obelophorus ^{c g}
- Odus ^{c g}
- Oidardis ^{c g}
- Oligopogon ^{c g}
- Oligoschema ^{c g}
- Ommatius Wiedemann, 1821^{i c g b}
- Omninablautus Pritchard, 1935^{i c g b}
- Ontomyia Dikow & Londt, 2000^{g}
- Opeatocerus ^{c g}
- Ophionomima ^{c g}
- Opocapsis ^{c g}
- Opseostlengis ^{c g}
- Oratostylum ^{c g}
- Orophotus ^{c g}
- Orrhodops ^{i c g}
- Orthogonis Herman, 1914^{i c g b}
- Ospriocerus Loew, 1866^{i g b}
- Othoniomyia ^{c g}
- Oxynoton ^{c g}
- Pachychoeta ^{c g}
- Palamopogon Bezzi, 1927^{g}
- Pamponerus ^{c g}
- Papaverellus Artigas & Vieira, 2014^{g}
- Paramochtherus ^{c g}
- Paraphamartania ^{c g}
- Parastenopogon ^{c g}
- Parataracticus Cole, 1924^{i c g b}
- Paraterpogon ^{c g}
- Paratractia ^{c g}
- Paritamus ^{c g}
- Pashtshenkoa ^{c g}
- Pedomyia ^{c g}
- Pegesimallus ^{c g}
- Perasis ^{i c g}
- Phellopteron ^{c g}
- Phellus ^{c g}
- Phileris ^{c g}
- Philodicus ^{c g}
- Philonerax ^{c g}
- Philonicus Loew, 1849^{i c g b}
- Phonicocleptes ^{c g}
- Plesiomma Macquart, 1838^{i c g b}
- Pogonioefferia Artigas & Papavero, 1997^{g}
- Pogonosoma Rondani, 1856^{i c g b}
- Polacantha Martin, 1975^{i c g b}
- Polyphonius ^{c g}
- Polysarca ^{c g}
- Polysarcodes ^{c g}
- Porasilus Curran, 1934^{g}
- Premochtherus ^{c g}
- Pritchardia ^{c g}
- Pritchardomyia Wilcox, 1965^{i c g b}
- Proagonistes ^{c g}
- Proctacanthella Bromley, 1934^{i c g b}
- Proctacanthus Macquart, 1838^{i c g b}
- Prolatiforceps ^{i c g}
- Prolepsis Walker, 1851^{i c g b}
- Promachella Cole & Pritchard, 1964^{i c g b}
- Promachus Loew, 1848^{i c g b} (giant robber flies)
- Pronomopsis ^{c g}
- Protichisma ^{c g}
- Protometer ^{c g}
- Prytanomyia ^{c g}
- Pseudomerodontina ^{c g}
- Pseudonusa ^{c g}
- Pseudophrisson Durrenfeldt, 1968^{g}
- Pseudorus ^{c g}
- Pseudoryclus ^{c g}
- Psilinus ^{c g}
- Psilocurus Loew, 1874^{i c g b}
- Psilonyx Aldrich, 1923^{i c g b}
- Psilozona ^{c g}
- Pycnomerinx ^{c g}
- Pycnopogon ^{c g}
- Pygommatius ^{c g}
- Questopogon ^{c g}
- Rachiopogon ^{c g}
- Reburrus ^{c g}
- Regasilus ^{i c g}
- Remotomyia ^{c g}
- Rhabdogaster ^{c g}
- Rhacholaemus ^{c g}
- Rhadinosoma ^{c g}
- Rhadinus ^{c g}
- Rhadiurgus ^{i c g}
- Rhatimomyia ^{c g}
- Rhayatus ^{c g}
- Rhipidocephala ^{c g}
- Rhopalogaster ^{c g}
- Robertomyia ^{c g}
- Saropogon Loew, 1847^{i c g b}
- Satanas ^{c g}
- Scarbroughia ^{c g}
- Schildia ^{c g}
- Scleropogon Loew, 1866^{i c g b}
- Scylaticina ^{c g}
- Scylaticus ^{c g}
- Scytomedes ^{c g}
- Senobasis ^{c g}
- Senoprosopis ^{c g}
- Sinopsilonyx ^{c g}
- Sintoria Hull, 1962^{i c g b}
- Sisyrnodytes ^{c g}
- Smeryngolaphria ^{c g}
- Spanurus ^{c g}
- Sphageus Loew, 1866^{g}
- Sphagomyia ^{c g}
- Sporadothrix ^{c g}
- Stackelberginia ^{c g}
- Stenasilus ^{c g}
- Stenommatius ^{c g}
- Stenopogon Loew, 1847^{i c g b}
- Stichopogon Loew, 1847^{i c g b}
- Stilpnogaster ^{c g}
- Stiphrolamyra ^{c g}
- Stizochymus ^{c g}
- Stizolestes ^{c g}
- Storthyngomerus ^{c g}
- Strombocodia ^{c g}
- Strophipogon ^{c g}
- Synolcus ^{c g}
- Systologaster ^{c g}
- Systropalpus ^{c g}
- Tanatchivia ^{c g}
- Taperigna ^{c g}
- Taracticus Loew, 1872^{i c g b}
- Templasilus ^{c g}
- Teratopomyia ^{c g}
- Thallosia ^{c g}
- Theodoria ^{c g}
- Thereutria ^{c g}
- Theromyia ^{c g}
- Theurgus ^{c g}
- Threnia ^{c g}
- Tipulogaster Cockerell, 1913^{i c g b}
- Tocantinia ^{c g}
- Tolmerolestes ^{c g}
- Tolmerus Loew, 1849^{c g b}
- Torasilus ^{c g}
- Torebroma ^{c g}
- Toremyia ^{c g}
- Townsendia Williston, 1895^{i c g b}
- Tricella ^{c g}
- Trichardis ^{c g}
- Trichardopsis ^{c g}
- Trichomachimus ^{c g}
- Trichoura ^{c g}
- Triclioscelis ^{c g}
- Triclis ^{c g}
- Trigonomima ^{c g}
- Triorla Parks, 1968^{i c g b}
- Tsacasia ^{c g}
- Tsacasiella ^{c g}
- Turka ^{c g}
- Udenopogon ^{c g}
- Ujguricola ^{c g}
- Valiraptor ^{c g}
- Wilcoxia James, 1941^{i c g b}
- Wilcoxius ^{c g}
- Willistonina ^{i c g}
- Wyliea ^{i b}
- Yksdarhus ^{c g}
- Zabrops Hull, 1958^{i c g b}
- Zabrotica ^{c g}
- Zelamyia ^{c g}
- Zosteria ^{c g}
- Zoticus ^{c g}

== Fossil genera ==
- †Araripogon Grimaldi, 1990^{g}
- ↑Asilopsis Cockerell, 1920^{g}
- †Burmapogon Dikow and Grimaldi, 2014
- †Cretagaster Dikow & Grimaldi, 2014^{g}
- †Protoloewinella Schumann, 1984
- †Stenocinclis Scudder, 1878^{g}

Data sources: i = ITIS, c = Catalogue of Life, g = GBIF, b = Bugguide.net
