= List of Asilinae genera =

These 183 genera belong to Asilinae, a subfamily of robber flies in the family Asilidae.

== Asilinae genera ==
- Abrophila Daniels, 1987
- Acasilus Londt, 2005
- Afroepitriptus Lehr, 1992
- Afromochtherus Lehr, 1996
- Albibarbefferia Artigas and Papavero, 1997
- Albicoma Lehr, 1986
- Alcimus Loew, 1848
- Amblyonychus Hermann, 1921
- Anacinaces Enderlein, 1914
- Anarmostus Loew, 1860
- Aneomochtherus Lehr, 1996
- Antipalus Loew, 1849
- Antiphrisson Loew, 1849
- Apoclea Macquart, 1838
- Apotinocerus Hull, 1962
- Argillemisca Lehr, 1967
- Aridefferia Artigas and Papavero, 1997
- Aristofolia Ayala Landa, 1978
- Artigasus Özdikmen, 2010
- Asilella Lehr, 1970
- Asiloephesus Lehr, 1992
- Asilus Linnaeus, 1758
- Asiola Daniels, 1977
- Astochia Becker in Becker and Stein, 1913
- Atractocoma Artigas, 1970
- Blepharotes Duncan, 1840
- Caenoura Londt, 2002
- Carinefferia Artigas and Papavero, 1997
- Carreraomyia Cole, 1969
- Cerdistus Loew, 1849
- Cerozodus Bigot, 1857
- Chilesus Bromley, 1932
- Clephydroneura Becker, 1925
- Cnodalomyia Hull, 1962
- Colepia Daniels, 1987
- Congomochtherus Oldroyd, 1970
- Conosiphon Becker, 1923
- Cratolestes Hull, 1962
- Cratopoda Hull, 1962
- Ctenodontina Enderlein, 1914
- Curvirostris Tomasovic, 2015
- Dasophrys Loew, 1858
- Dicropaltum Martin, 1975
- Didysmachus Lehr, 1996
- Dikowmyia Londt, 2002
- Diplosynapsis Enderlein, 1914
- Dolopus Daniels, 1987
- Dysclytus Loew, 1858
- Dysmachus Loew, 1860
- Dystolmus Lehr, 1996
- Eccoptopus Loew, 1860
- Eccritosia Schiner, 1866
- Echthistus Loew, 1849
- Efferia Coquillett, 1893
- Eicherax Bigot, 1857
- Eichoichemus Bigot, 1857
- Ekkentronomyia Ibáñez-Bernal and Fisher, 2015
- Engelepogon Lehr, 1992
- Epiklisis Becker, 1925
- Epipamponeurus Becker, 1919
- Erax Scopoli, 1763
- Eraxasilus Carrera, 1959
- Erebunus Richter, 1966
- Eremisca Hull, 1962
- Eremonotus Theodor, 1980
- Esatanas Lehr, 1986
- Etrurus Lehr, 1992
- Eutolmus Loew, 1848
- Filiolus Lehr, 1967
- Gibbasilus Londt, 1986
- Glaphyropyga Schiner, 1866
- Gongromyia Londt, 2002
- Heligmonevra Bigot, 1858
- Hippomachus Engel, 1927
- Hoplopheromerus Becker, 1925
- Irianjaya Koçak & Kemal, 2009
- Juxtasilus Londt, 2005
- Ktyr Lehr, 1967
- Ktyrimisca Lehr, 1967
- Kurzenkoiellus Lehr, 1995
- Labarus Londt, 2005
- Labromyia Hull, 1962
- Lecania Macquart, 1838
- Leinendera Carrera, 1945
- Leleyellus Lehr, 1995
- Leptoharpacticus Lynch Arribálzaga, 1880
- Lestophonax Hull, 1962
- Lochmorhynchus Engel, 1930
- Lochyrus Artigas, 1970
- Longivena Vieira and Rafael, 2014
- Lycomya Bigot, 1857
- Lycoprosopa Hull, 1962
- Machimus Loew, 1849
- Machiremisca Lehr, 1996
- Mallophora Macquart, lers)
- Martintella Artigas, 1996
- Mauropteron Daniels, 1987
- Megadrillus Bigot, 1857
- Megalometopon Artigas and Papavero, 1995
- Megaphorus Bigot, 1857
- Melouromyia Londt, 2002
- Mercuriana Lehr, 1988
- Millenarius Londt, 2005
- Minicatus Lehr, 1992
- Myaptex Hull, 1962
- Myaptexaria Artigas and Papavero, 1995
- Negasilus Curran, 1934
- Neoaratus Ricardo, 1913
- Neocerdistus Hardy, 1926
- Neoepitriptus Lehr, 1992
- Neoitamus Osten Sacken, 1878
- Neolophonotus Engel, 1925
- Neomochtherus Osten Sacken, 1878
- Neotes Artigas and Papavero, 1995
- Nerax Hull, 1962
- Nevadasilus Artigas & Papavero, 1995
- Nomomyia Artigas, 1970
- Notomochtherus Londt, 2002
- Odus Lehr, 1986
- Oldroydiana Lehr, 1996
- Oligoschema Becker, 1925
- Ommatius Wiedemann, 1821
- Orophotus Becker, 1925
- Pamponerus Loew, 1849
- Papaverellus Artigas and Vieira, 2014
- Paramochtherus Theodor, 1980
- Pararatus Ricardo, 1913
- Pashtshenkoa Lehr, 1995
- Phileris Tsacas and Weinberg, 1976
- Philodicus Loew, 1847
- Philonicus Loew, 1849
- Pogonioefferia Artigas and Papavero, 1997
- Polacantha Martin, 1975
- Polyphonius Loew, 1848
- Polysarca Schiner, 1866
- Polysarcodes Paramonov, 1937
- Porasilus Curran, 1934
- Premochtherus Lehr, 1996
- Proctacanthella Bromley, 1934
- Proctacanthus Macquart, 1838
- Proctophoroides Artigas and Papavero, 1995
- Prolatiforceps Martin, 1975
- Promachella Cole and Pritchard, 1964
- Promachus Loew, 1848
- Pseuderemisca Lehr, 1986
- Pseudophrisson Dürrenfeldt, 1968
- Pteralbis Ayala Landa, 1981
- Reburrus Daniels, 1987
- Regasilus Curran, 1931
- Reminasus Lehr, 1979
- Rhadinosoma Artigas, 1970
- Rhadiurgus Loew, 1849
- Robertomyia Londt, 1990
- Satanas Jacobson, 1908
- Scarbroughia Papavero, 2009
- Senoprosopis Macquart, 1838
- Sphagomyia Londt, 2002
- Stenasilus Carrera, 1960
- Stilpnogaster Loew, 1849
- Stizolestes Hull, 1962
- Strophipogon Hull, 1958
- Synolcus Loew, 1858
- Taurhynchus Artigas and Papavero, 1995
- Templasilus Peris, 1957
- Theodoriana Lehr, 1987
- Threnia Schiner, 1868
- Tolmerus Loew, 1849
- Torasilus Londt, 2005
- Trichomachimus Engel, 1934
- Triorla Parks, 1968
- Tsacasia Artigas and Papavero, 1995
- Tsacasiella Lehr, 1996
- Tuberconspicus Tomasovic, 2013
- Tuberculefferia Artigas and Papavero, 1997
- Turka Özdikmen, 2008
- Ujguricola Lehr, 1970
- Valiraptor Londt, 2002
- Wilcoxius Martin, 1975
- Wygodasilus Artigas and Papavero, 1995
- Wyliea Martin, 1975
- Yksdarhus Hradsky and Hüttinger, 1983
- Zelamyia Londt, 2005
- Zosteria Daniels, 1987
- Zoticus Artigas, 1970
- † Asilopsis Cockerell, 1920
