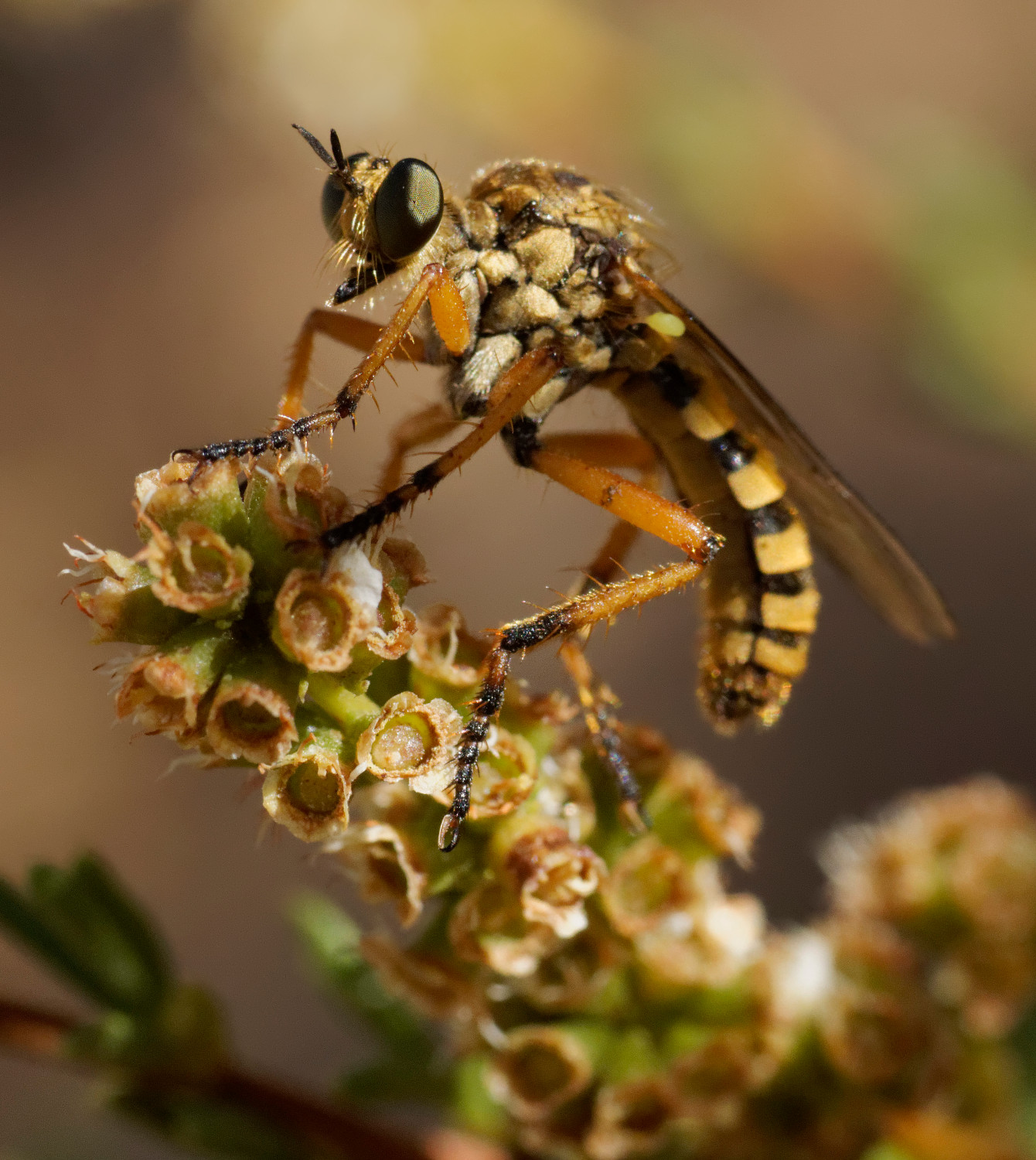
- Callinicus pictitarsis

Scientific classification
- Domain: Eukaryota
- Kingdom: Animalia
- Phylum: Arthropoda
- Class: Insecta
- Order: Diptera
- Family: Asilidae
- Subfamily: Stenopogoninae

= Stenopogoninae =

Subfamily of flies

Stenopogoninae is a subfamily of robber flies in the family Asilidae. There are more than 70 genera and 740 described species in Stenopogoninae.

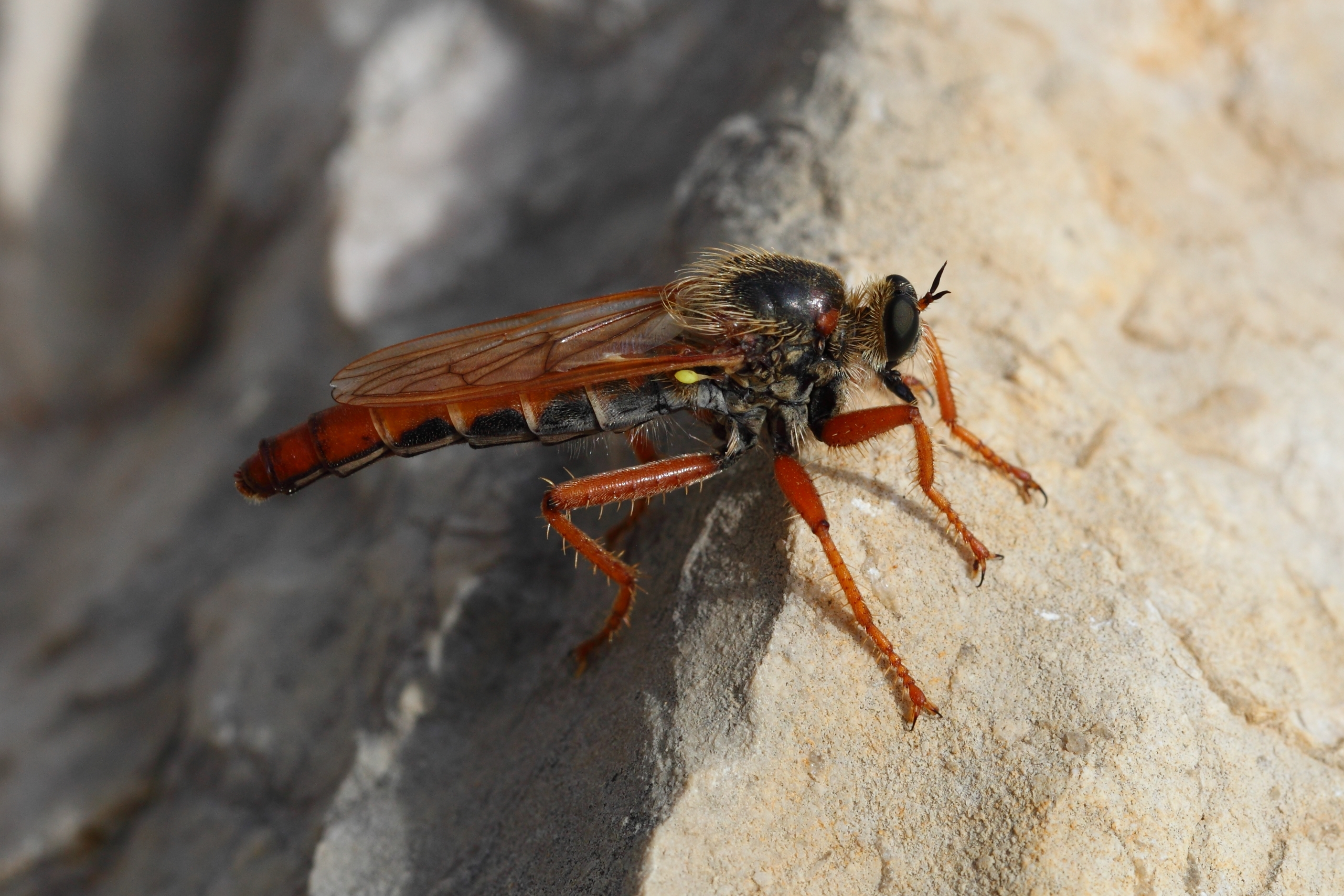
Stenopogon sabaudus

== Genera ==
These 76 genera belong to the subfamily Stenopogoninae:

- Afroscleropogon Londt, 1999
- Anarolius Loew, 1844
- Anasillomos Londt, 1983
- Ancylorhynchus Berthold in Latreille, 1827
- Anisopogon Roeder, 1881
- Araujoa Artigas and Papavero, 1991
- Archilestroides Artigas and Papavero, 1991
- Argyrochira Richter, 1968
- Astylopogon Meijere, 1913
- Aymarasilus Artigas, 1974
- Backomyia Wilcox and Martin, 1957
- Bana Londt, 1992
- Callinicus Loew, 1872
- Connomyia Londt, 1992
- Corymyia Londt, 1994
- Creolestes Hull, 1962
- Crobilocerus Loew, 1847
- Cylicomera Lynch ArribÃ¡lzaga, 1881
- Cystoprosopa Hull, 1962
- Danomyia Londt, 1993
- Dapsilochaetus Hull, 1962
- Daspletis Loew, 1859
- Dasypecus Philippi, 1865
- Dicranus Loew, 1851
- Dioctobroma Hull, 1962
- Dogonia Oldroyd, 1970
- Empodiodes Oldroyd, 1972
- Enigmomorphus Hermann, 1912
- Eriopogon Loew, 1847
- Eucyrtopogon Curran, 1923
- Euthrixius Artigas, 1971
- Fishermyia Londt, 2012
- Galactopogon Engel, 1929
- Gonioscelis Schiner, 1866
- Grajahua Artigas and Papavero, 1991
- Graptostylus Hull, 1962
- Grypoctonus Speiser, 1928
- Hadrokolos Martin, 1959
- Haroldia Londt, 1999
- Harpagobroma Hull, 1962
- Hystrichopogon Hermann, 1906
- Illudium Richter, 1962
- Iranopogon Timon-David, 1955
- Itolia Wilcox, 1936
- Ivettea Artigas and Papavero, 1991
- Jothopogon Becker in Becker and Stein, 1913
- Leptochelina Artigas, 1970
- Lithoeciscus Bezzi, 1927
- Lonquimayus Artigas and Papavero, 1991
- Microstylum Macquart, 1838
- Neodioctria Ricardo, 1918
- Neoholopogon Joseph and Parui, 1989
- Neoscleropogon Malloch, 1928
- Nothopogon Artigas and Papavero, 1991
- Oldroydella Özdikmen, 2006
- Ontomyia Dikow and Londt, 2000
- Oratostylum Ricardo, 1925
- Ospriocerus Loew, 1866
- Plesiomma Macquart, 1838
- Pritchardia Stuardo Ortiz, 1946
- Pritchardomyia Wilcox, 1965
- Prolepsis Walker, 1851
- Pycnomerinx Hull, 1962
- Raulcortesia Artigas and Papavero, 1991
- Remotomyia Londt, 1983
- Rhacholaemus Hermann, 1907
- Rhayatus Özdikmen, 2006
- Scleropogon Loew, 1866
- Scylaticina Artigas and Papavero, 1991
- Scylaticodes Artigas and Papavero, 1991
- Scylaticus Loew, 1858
- Sintoria Hull, 1962
- Stenopogon Loew, 1847
- Taperigna Artigas and Papavero, 1991
- Wilcoxia James, 1941
- Zabrotica Hull, 1958
