= Ktyr =

Ktyr or KTYR may refer to:

- Ktyr (fly), a genus of robber flies
- KTYR, an American radio station
- Tyler Pounds Regional Airport (ICAO: KTYR), an American airport
