= Anisopogon (disambiguation) =

Anisopogon may refer to:

- Anisopogon, a genus of Australian plants in the grass family
- Anisopogon (fly), a genus of Diptera in the family Asilidae or robber flies
