= Apocleinae =

Scientific classification
- Domain: Eukaryota
- Kingdom: Animalia
- Phylum: Arthropoda
- Class: Insecta
- Order: Diptera
- Family: Asilidae
- Subfamily: Apocleinae

Subfamily of insects

Apocleinae are a subfamily of assassin flies proposed in 1973. The proposed taxon is, however, polyphyletic and is no longer recognized as a subfamily. Most 'Apocleinae' genera are now included in the subfamily Asilinae.
