= Eremonotus =

Eremonotus may refer to:

- Eremonotus (fly), a genus of flies in the family Asilidae
- Eremonotus (plant), a genus of liverworts in the family Jungermanniaceae
