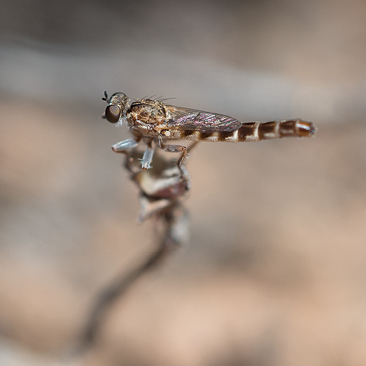
- Trichoura tankwa

Scientific classification
- Domain: Eukaryota
- Kingdom: Animalia
- Phylum: Arthropoda
- Class: Insecta
- Order: Diptera
- Family: Asilidae
- Subfamily: Stenopogoninae
- Genus: Trichoura; Londt, 1994

= Trichoura =

Genus of flies

Trichoura is a genus of robber flies in the family Asilidae discovered by Londt in 1994. There are 7 described species in Trichoura. Species in this genus live in tropical biomes across the African continent.

== Species ==
These 7 species belong to the genus Trichoura:

- Trichoura krugeri Londt, 1994
- Trichoura mesochora Londt, 1994
- Trichoura pardeos Londt and Dikow, 2016
- Trichoura proctomeces Londt, 1994
- Trichoura tankwa Londt, 1994
- Trichoura torynopoda Londt, 1994
- Trichoura tyligma Londt, 1994
