= Hadrokolos texanus =

Scientific classification
- Domain: Eukaryota
- Kingdom: Animalia
- Phylum: Arthropoda
- Class: Insecta
- Order: Diptera
- Family: Asilidae
- Genus: Hadrokolos
- Species: H. texanus

Binomial name
- Hadrokolos texanus (Bromley, 1934)

Synonyms
- Holopogon texanus Bromley, 1934

Species of fly

Hadrokolos texanus is a species of robber flies in the family Asilidae.
