= Itolia maculata =

Scientific classification
- Domain: Eukaryota
- Kingdom: Animalia
- Phylum: Arthropoda
- Class: Insecta
- Order: Diptera
- Family: Asilidae
- Genus: Itolia
- Species: I. maculata

Binomial name
- Itolia maculata Wilcox, 1936

Species of fly

Itolia maculata is a species of robber flies in the family Asilidae.
