= Dicropaltum rubicundus =

Scientific classification
- Domain: Eukaryota
- Kingdom: Animalia
- Phylum: Arthropoda
- Class: Insecta
- Order: Diptera
- Family: Asilidae
- Genus: Dicropaltum
- Species: D. rubicundus

Binomial name
- Dicropaltum rubicundus (Hine, 1909)

Synonyms
- Asilus rubicundus Hine, 1909

Species of fly

Dicropaltum rubicundus is a species of robber flies in the family Asilidae.
