= Plesiomma unicolor =

Scientific classification
- Domain: Eukaryota
- Kingdom: Animalia
- Phylum: Arthropoda
- Class: Insecta
- Order: Diptera
- Family: Asilidae
- Genus: Plesiomma
- Species: P. unicolor

Binomial name
- Plesiomma unicolor Loew, 1866

Species of fly

Plesiomma unicolor is a species of robber fly in the family Asilidae.
