= Cabasa (fly) =

Scientific classification
- Kingdom: Animalia
- Phylum: Arthropoda
- Class: Insecta
- Order: Diptera
- Family: Asilidae
- Genus: Cabasa

Genus of flies

Cabasa is a genus of robber flies in the family Asilidae. There are at least three described species in Cabasa.

== Species ==
These three species belong to the genus Cabasa:

- Cabasa glabrata (Walker, 1861)^{c g}
- Cabasa honesta (Walker, 1858)^{c g}
- Cabasa pulchella (Macquart, 1846)^{c g}

Data sources: i = ITIS, c = Catalogue of Life, g = GBIF, b = Bugguide.net
