= Turka (fly) =

Scientific classification
- Domain: Eukaryota
- Kingdom: Animalia
- Phylum: Arthropoda
- Class: Insecta
- Order: Diptera
- Family: Asilidae
- Subfamily: Asilinae
- Genus: Turka

Genus of flies

Turka is a genus of robber flies in the family Asilidae. There are at least four described species in Turka.

== Species ==
These four species belong to the genus Turka:

- Turka cervinus (Loew, 1856)^{c}
- Turka nudus (Lehr, 1996)^{c g}
- Turka tridentatus (Loew, 1871)^{c g}
- Turka zaitzevi (Lehr, 1996)^{c}

Data sources: i = ITIS, c = Catalogue of Life, g = GBIF, b = Bugguide.net
