= Plesiomma =

Scientific classification
- Domain: Eukaryota
- Kingdom: Animalia
- Phylum: Arthropoda
- Class: Insecta
- Order: Diptera
- Family: Asilidae
- Subfamily: Stenopogoninae
- Genus: Plesiomma; Macquart, 1838

Genus of flies

Plesiomma is a genus of robber flies in the family Asilidae. There are at least 20 described species in Plesiomma.

== Species ==
These 20 species belong to the genus Plesiomma:

- Plesiomma angustum Macquart, 1848
- Plesiomma atrum Bromley, 1929
- Plesiomma caedens (Wiedemann, 1828)
- Plesiomma caminarium (Wiedemann, 1828)
- Plesiomma darlingtoni Hull
- Plesiomma ferrugineum (Macquart, 1838)
- Plesiomma fuliginosum (Wiedemann, 1821)
- Plesiomma funestum Loew, 1861
- Plesiomma haemorrhoum (Fabricius, 1805)
- Plesiomma indecorum Loew, 1866
- Plesiomma inflatum Hull, 1962
- Plesiomma jungens Schiner, 1867
- Plesiomma leptogastrum Loew, 1866
- Plesiomma lineatum (Fabricius, 1781)
- Plesiomma salti Bromley, 1929
- Plesiomma semirufum (Wiedemann, 1828)
- Plesiomma sepia Hull, 1962
- Plesiomma simile Scarbrough & Perez-Gelabert, 2006
- Plesiomma testaceum Macquart, 1838
- Plesiomma unicolor Loew, 1866
