= Tanatchivia =

Scientific classification
- Kingdom: Animalia
- Phylum: Arthropoda
- Class: Insecta
- Order: Diptera
- Family: Asilidae
- Genus: Tanatchivia; Hradský, 1983

Genus of flies

Tanatchivia is a genus of insects in the family Asilidae.
