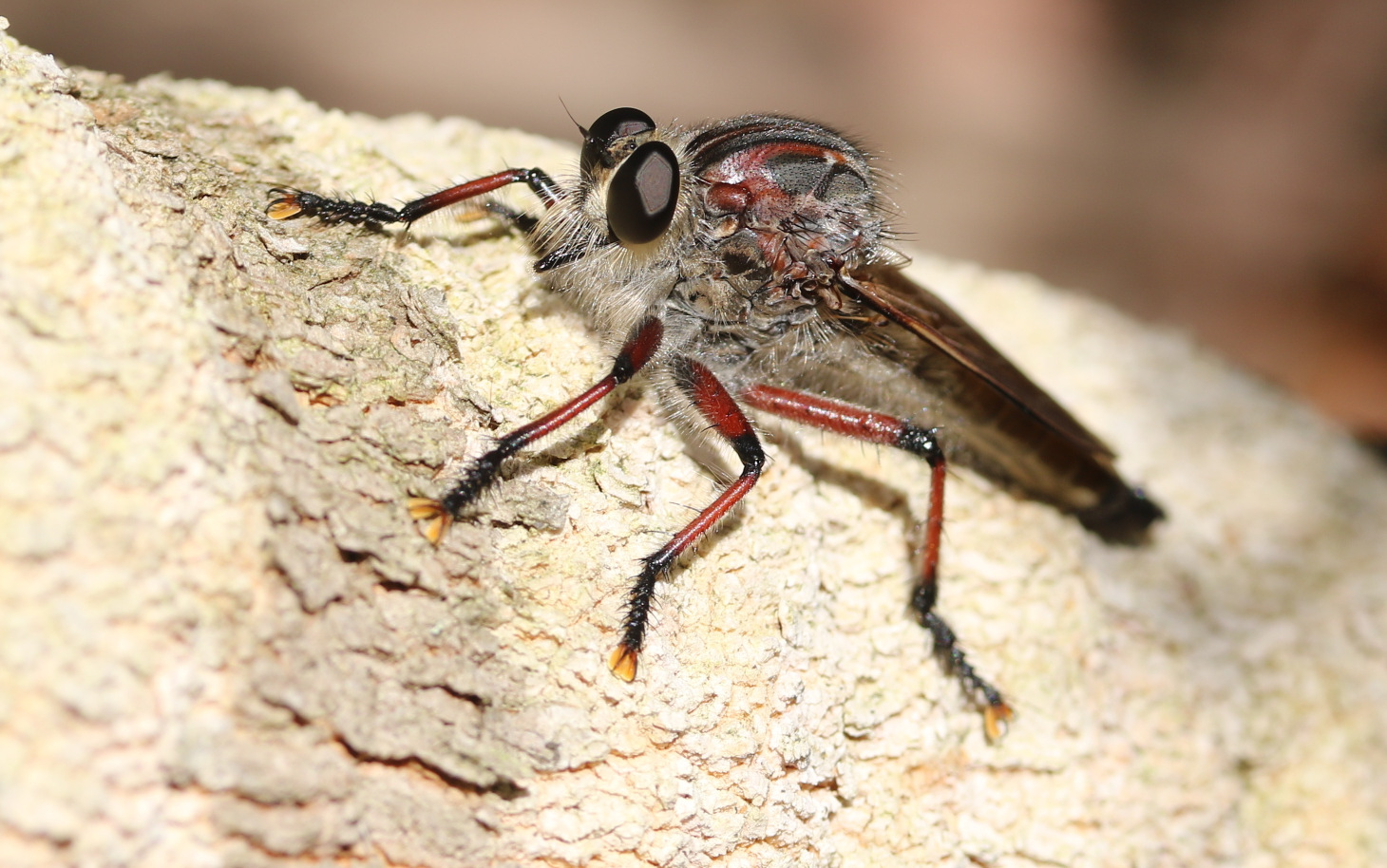
- Lane Cove National Park, Australia

Scientific classification
- Kingdom: Animalia
- Phylum: Arthropoda
- Clade: Pancrustacea
- Class: Insecta
- Order: Diptera
- Family: Asilidae
- Subfamily: Asilinae
- Genus: Neoaratus; Ricardo, 1913
- Species: N. hercules

Binomial name
- Neoaratus hercules (Wiedemann 1828)

= Neoaratus =

Australian insect

Neoaratus is a monotypic genus of flies.

Neoaratus hercules, the hercules robberfly is a species of insect endemic to Australia. A large predatory robberfly found in south east of the continent and in Tasmania. Growing to 4 cm in length, it feeds on other insects in flight. The habitat is forest and woodland.
