= Odus (fly) =

Scientific classification
- Kingdom: Animalia
- Phylum: Arthropoda
- Class: Insecta
- Order: Diptera
- Family: Asilidae
- Subfamily: Asilinae
- Genus: Odus

Genus of flies

Odus is a genus of robber flies in the family Asilidae. There is at least one described species in Odus, O. fragilis.
