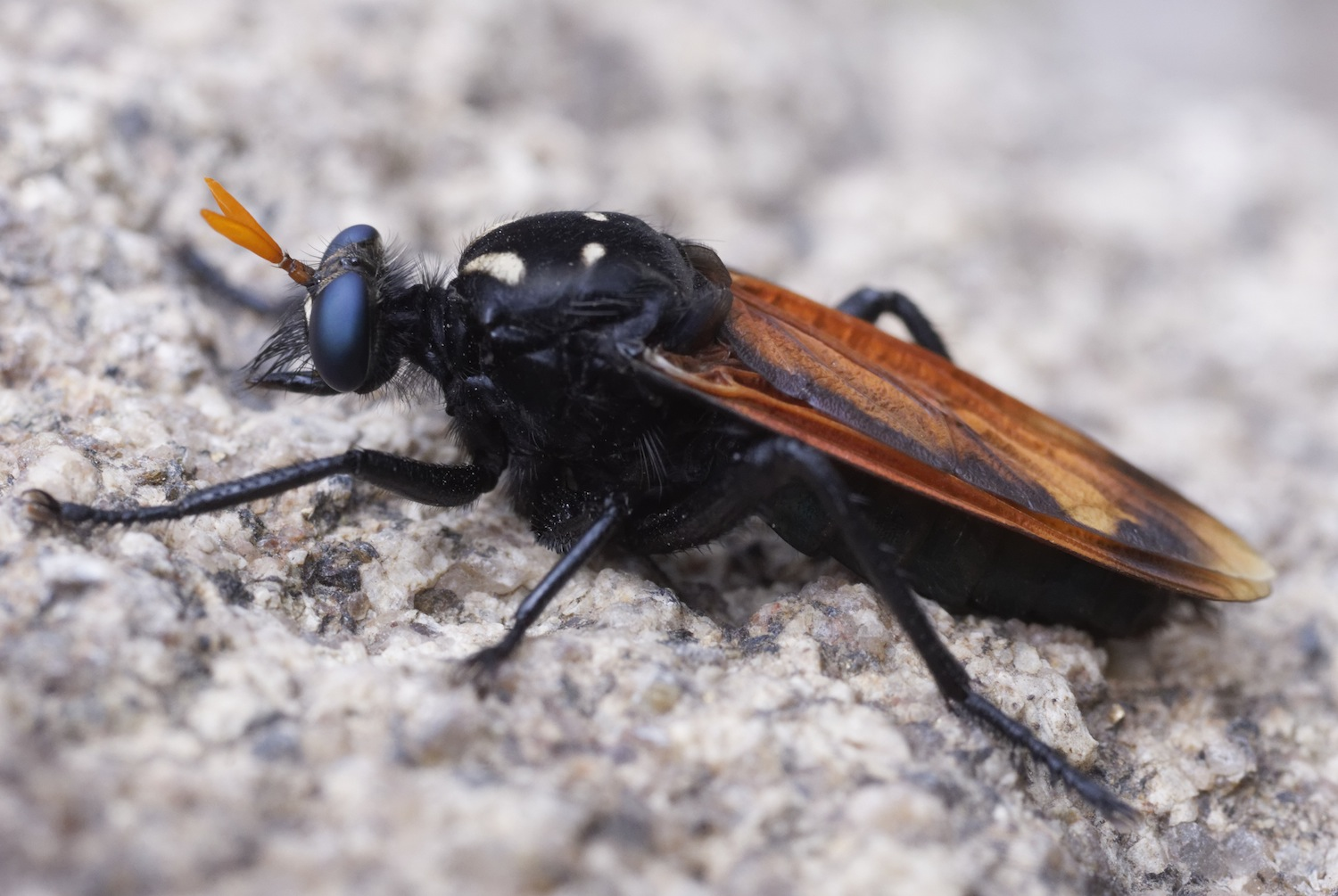
- Female of Prolepsis lucifer photographed in Reserva Natural Parque San Martin, Cordoba, Argentina

Scientific classification
- Domain: Eukaryota
- Kingdom: Animalia
- Phylum: Arthropoda
- Class: Insecta
- Order: Diptera
- Family: Asilidae
- Subfamily: Stenopogoninae
- Genus: Prolepsis; Walker, [1851]

Type species
- Prolepsis lucifer (Wiedemann, 1828)

Species
- about 20, see text

Synonyms
- Cacodaemon Shiner, 1866; Dizonias Loew, 1866; Sphageus Loew, 1866; Tolmerolestes Lynch Arribálzaga, 1881; Cacodaemonides Strand, 1928

= Prolepsis (fly) =

Genus of flies

Prolepsis is an insect genus of mainly neotropical Diptera in the family Asilidae or robber flies.

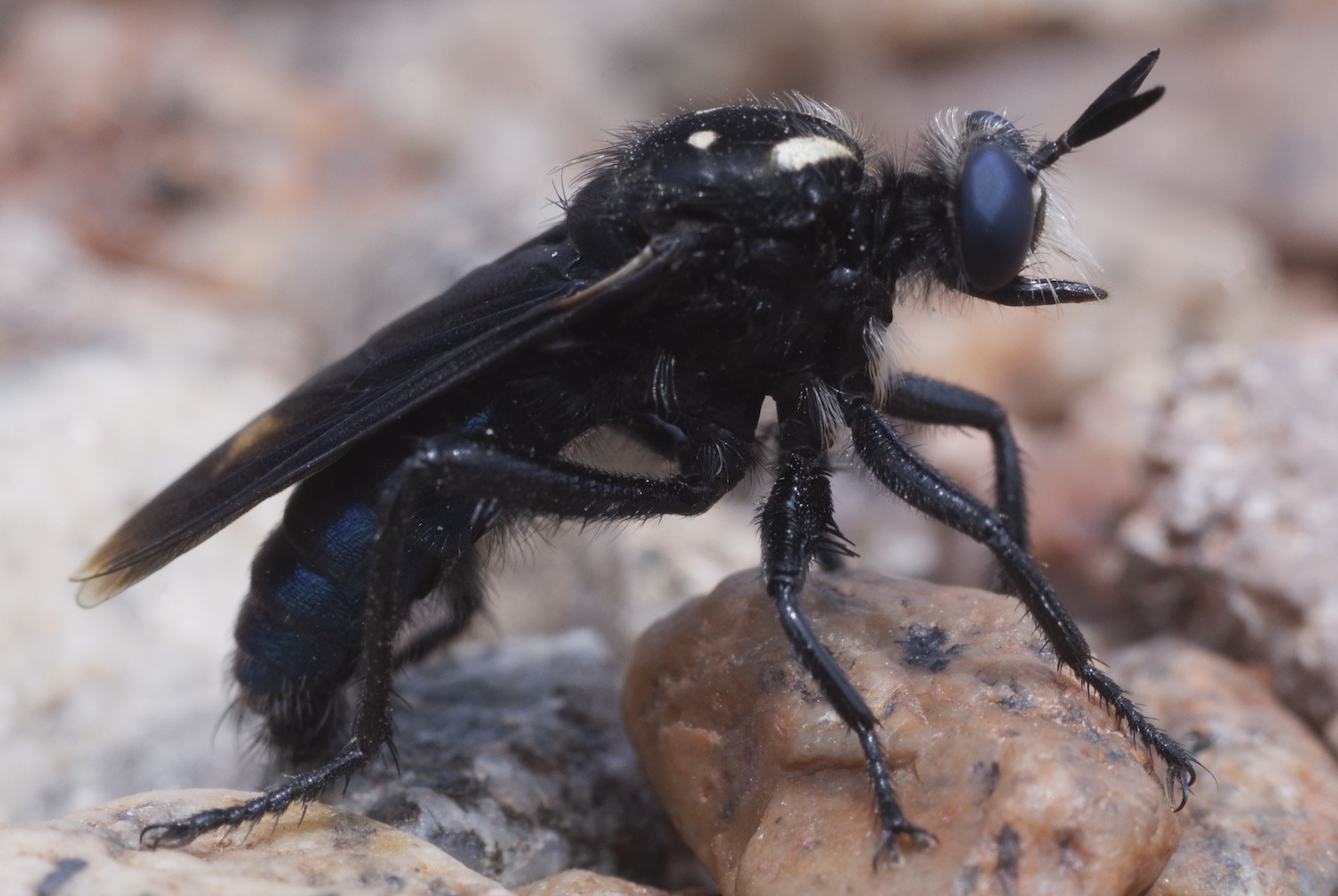
Male of Prolepsis lucifer photographed in Reserva Natural Parque San Martin, Cordoba, Argentina

== Description ==
Medium-sized robber flies (14–25 mm) with antennae that have a relatively long third article. Abdomen is rather plump compared to many other asilids. Wings usually extending past the abdomen and often tinted or pigmented along most of their length. Coloration predominantly black to brown or reddish; often mimicking spider wasps. The two sexes can have distinctly different colors. Ventral side of the femur of the middle leg pair often with a thick patch of short and stout spines.

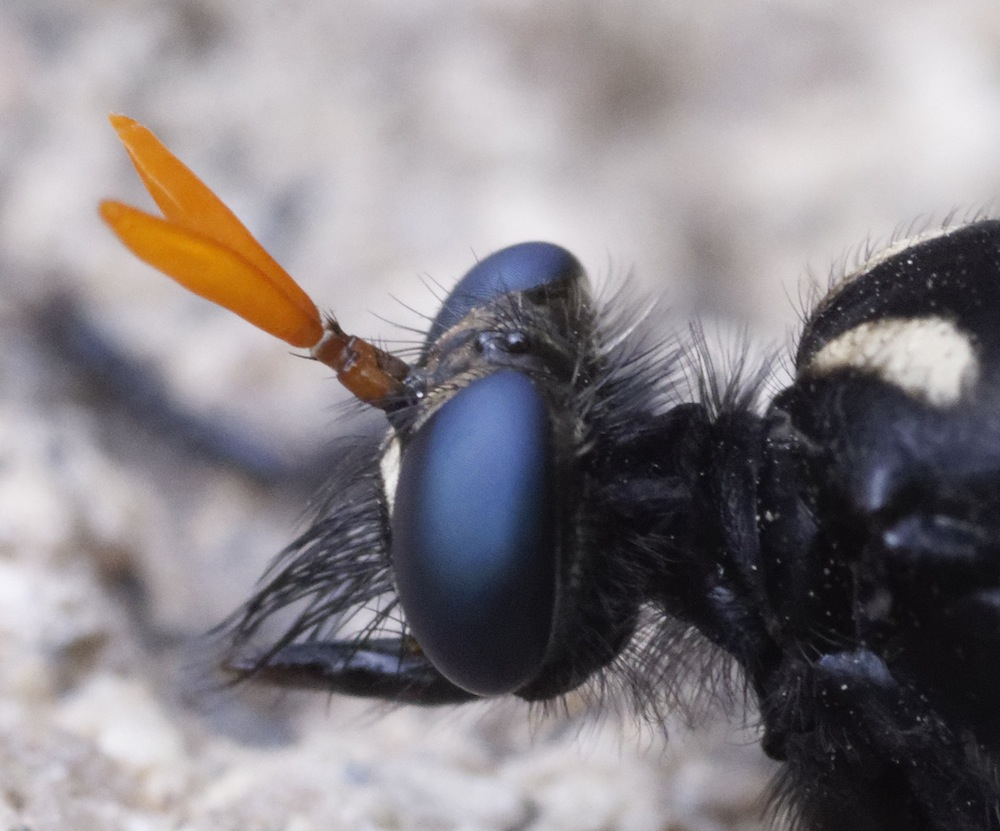
Long third article of the antennae in Prolepsis lucifer. In Prolepsis species it is typically 2 to 3 times longer than the first and second articles combined.

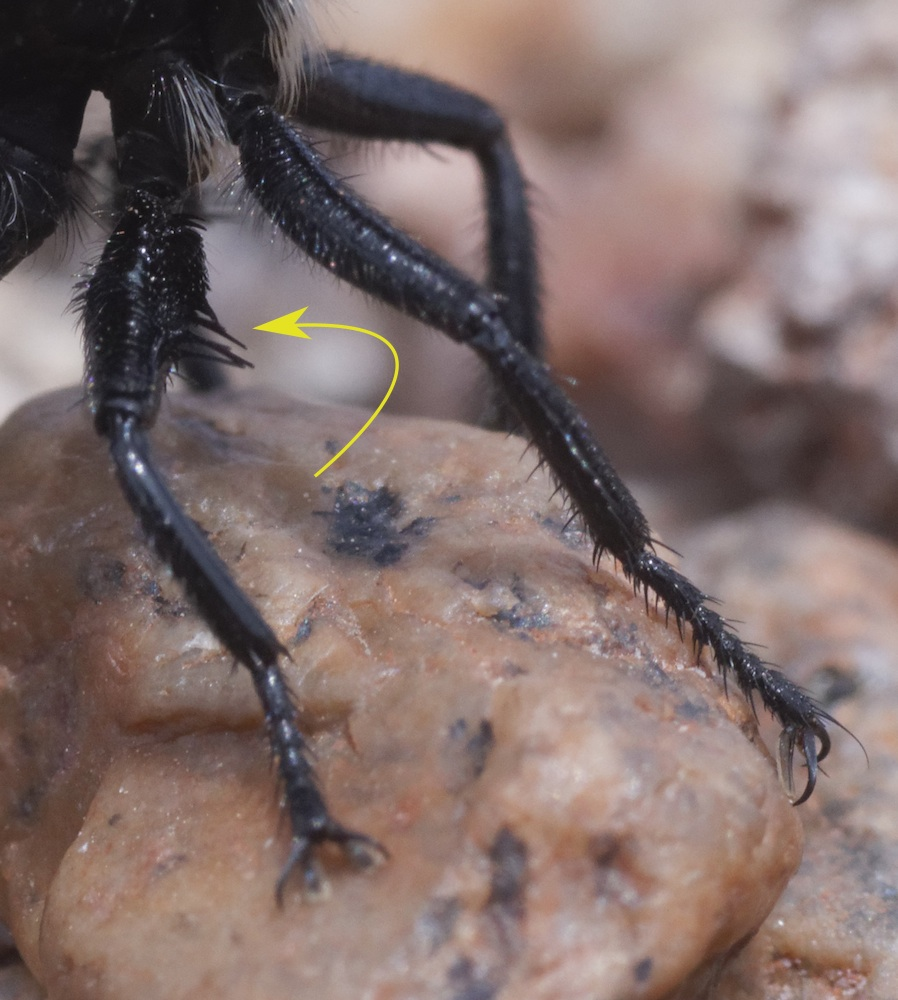
The yellow arrow points at the ventral patch of thick bristles on the middle femur in a male Prolepsis lucifer from San Martin. Many Prolepsis species have a similar feature.

== Biology ==
As is typical for robber flies, adults of Prolepsis species are ambush predators, taking off from a resting position on the ground or on branches to intercept other flying insects in mid-air. Prey are probably taken from a wide variety of insect orders: Robert Lavigne's Predator-Prey Database for the family Asilidae has one record for Prolepsis lucifer feeding on the dung beetle Canthidium globulum and four records for Prolepsis tristis feeding on the following identified prey species: the clown beetle Epierus formidolosus, the blister beetle Epicauta trichrus, the hoverfly Eristalis dimidiatus and the Western honeybee Apis mellifera. Herschel Raney's webpage for Prolepsis tristis includes example images of cannibalism and color variation among males. It also illustrates the extreme difference in coloration of both sexes that occurs in this particular species.

Larval stages have received little study to date, but the first instar larvae of P. lucifer are reported to prey voraciously on the subterranean scale insect or ground pearl Eurhizococcus brasiliensis, with possible biocontrol applications for protection of grapevines in Brazil

== Taxonomy ==
These 20 species belong to the genus Prolepsis:

- Prolepsis albifasciatus (Back, 1904)
- Prolepsis bicinctus (Loew, 1866)
- Prolepsis caeroniformis (Schiner, 1867)
- Prolepsis chalcoproctus (Loew, 1866)
- Prolepsis colalao Lamas, 1973
- Prolepsis costaricensis Lamas, 1973
- Prolepsis elotensis (Martin, 1966)
- Prolepsis funebris Lamas, 1973
- Prolepsis huatajata Lamas, 1973
- Prolepsis indecisa Lamas, 1973
- Prolepsis lucasi (Bellardi, 1861)
- Prolepsis lucifer (Wiedemann, 1828)
- Prolepsis martini Lamas, 1973
- Prolepsis phoenicurus (Loew, 1866)
- Prolepsis pilatei (Johnson, 1903)
- Prolepsis pseudopluto Lamas, 1973
- Prolepsis quadrimaculatus (Bellardi, 1861)
- Prolepsis quadrinotatum (Bigot, 1878)
- Prolepsis sandaracus (Martin, 1966)
- Prolepsis tristis (Walker, 1851)

== Phylogeny ==
Combined analysis of morphological and molecular characters places Prolepsis tristis in a clade corresponding to the subfamily Stenopogoninae, without however providing direct support for monophyly of this subfamily.
