= Phellus (fly) =

Scientific classification
- Domain: Eukaryota
- Kingdom: Animalia
- Phylum: Arthropoda
- Class: Insecta
- Order: Diptera
- Family: Asilidae
- Genus: Phellus

Genus of flies

Phellus is a genus of robber flies in the family Asilidae. There are at least three described species in Phellus.

== Species ==
These three species belong to the genus Phellus:

- Phellus glaucus Walker, 1851^{c g}
- Phellus olgae Paramonov, 1953^{c g}
- Phellus piliferus Dakin & Fordham, 1922^{c g}

Data sources: i = ITIS, c = Catalogue of Life, g = GBIF, b = Bugguide.net
