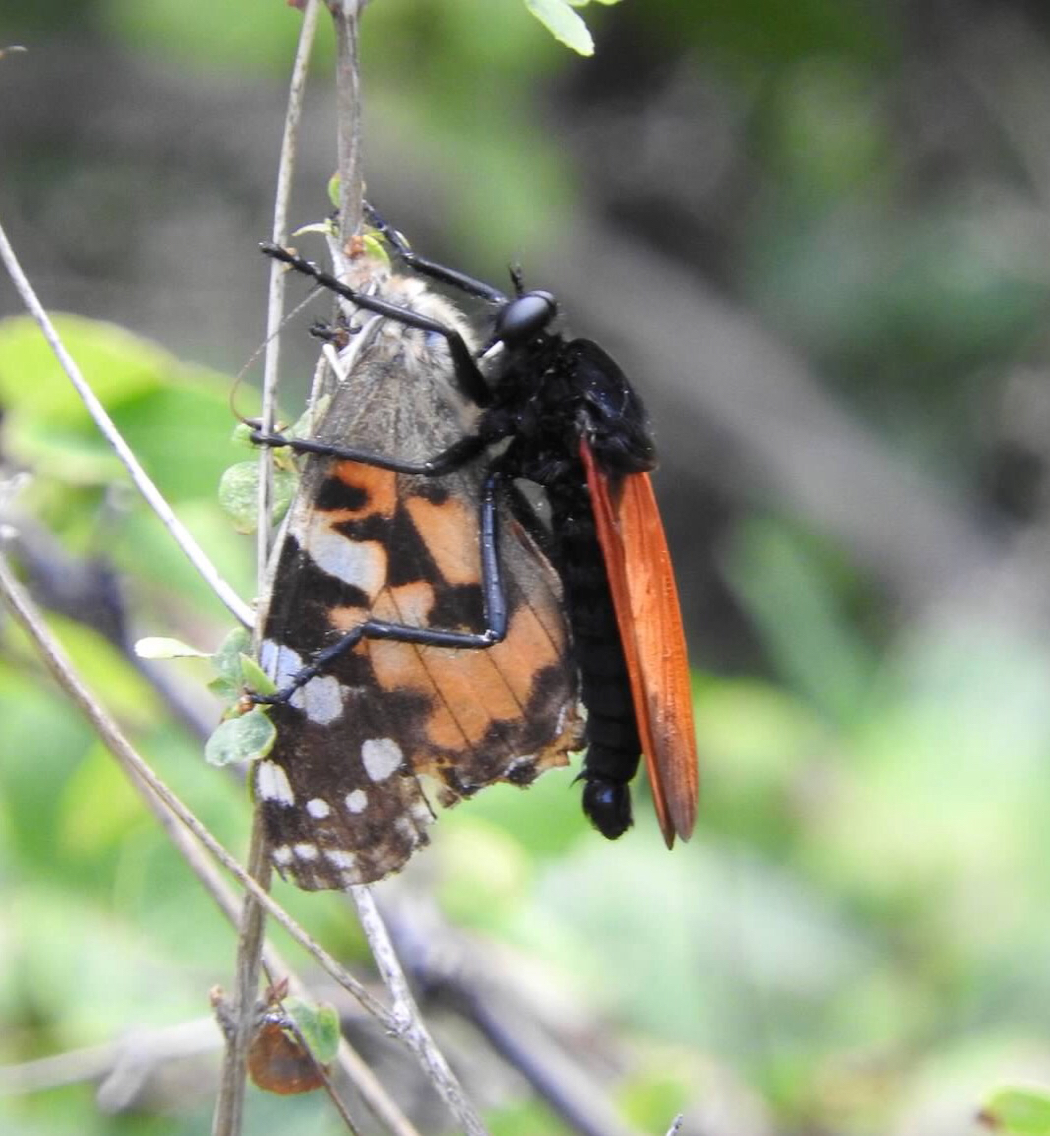
- Wyliea mydas eating a painted lady

Scientific classification
- Domain: Eukaryota
- Kingdom: Animalia
- Phylum: Arthropoda
- Class: Insecta
- Order: Diptera
- Family: Asilidae
- Subfamily: Asilinae
- Genus: Wyliea; Martin, 1975

= Wyliea =

Genus of flies

Wyliea is a genus of robber flies in the family Asilidae.

== Species ==
The following species are recognised in the genus Wyliea:

Image	Species
	Wyliea chrysauges (Osten Sacken, 1887)
	Wyliea mydas (Brauer, 1885)
