= Tolmerus =

Scientific classification
- Domain: Eukaryota
- Kingdom: Animalia
- Phylum: Arthropoda
- Class: Insecta
- Order: Diptera
- Family: Asilidae
- Subfamily: Asilinae
- Genus: Tolmerus; Loew, 1849

Genus of flies

Tolmerus is a genus of robber flies in the family Asilidae. There are about 19 described species in Tolmerus.

== Species ==
These 19 species belong to the genus Tolmerus:

- Tolmerus atripes Loew, 1854^{g}
- Tolmerus baezi Hradsky & Bosak, 2006^{c g}
- Tolmerus bolgaricus Lehr, 1981^{g}
- Tolmerus corsicus Schiner, 1867^{g}
- Tolmerus eximius Becker, 1923^{g}
- Tolmerus ferox Becker, 1923^{g}
- Tolmerus impiger Becker, 1923^{g}
- Tolmerus incommunis Becker, 1923^{g}
- Tolmerus lesinensis Palm, 1876^{g}
- Tolmerus novarensis Schiner, 1868^{g}
- Tolmerus oromii Hradsky & Bosak, 2006^{c g}
- Tolmerus paganus Becker, 1923^{g}
- Tolmerus pauper Becker, 1923^{g}
- Tolmerus perfectus Becker, 1923^{g}
- Tolmerus tesselatus (Loew, 1849)^{g}
- Tolmerus trifissilis Seguy, 1929^{g}
- Tolmerus ventriculus Becker, 1923^{g}
- Tolmerus vescus^{b}
- Tolmerus weinbergae Hradsky & Bosak, 2006^{c g}

Data sources: i = ITIS, c = Catalogue of Life, g = GBIF, b = Bugguide.net
