= Erythropogon (fly) =

Scientific classification
- Domain: Eukaryota
- Kingdom: Animalia
- Phylum: Arthropoda
- Class: Insecta
- Order: Diptera
- Family: Asilidae
- Genus: Erythropogon

Genus of flies

Erythropogon is a genus of robber flies in the family Asilidae. There is at least one described species in Erythropogon, E. ichneumoniformis.
