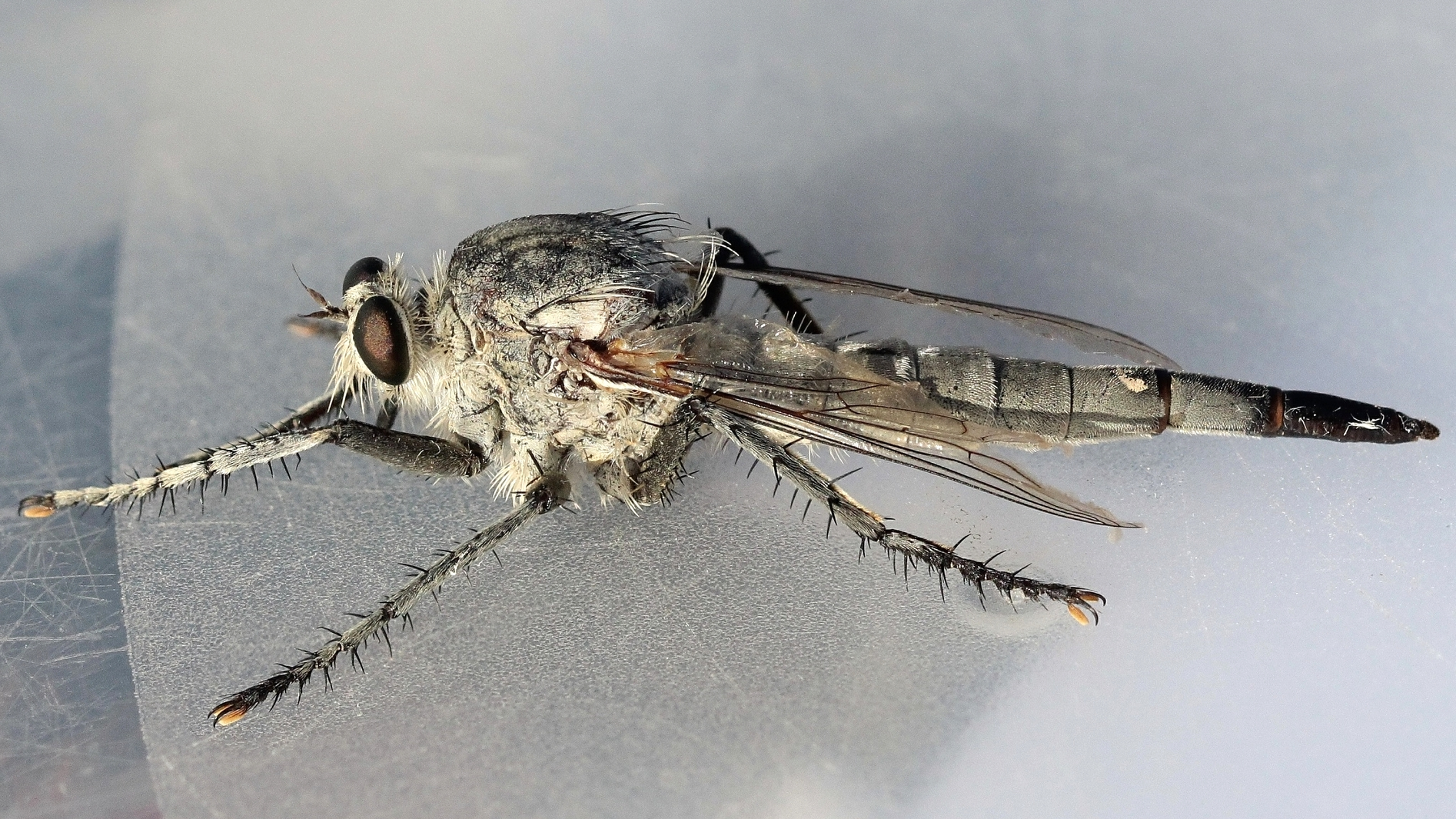
- Satanas gigas

Scientific classification
- Kingdom: Animalia
- Phylum: Arthropoda
- Class: Insecta
- Order: Diptera
- Family: Asilidae
- Subfamily: Asilinae
- Genus: Satanas; Jacobson, 1908

= Satanas (fly) =

Genus of flies

Satanas is a genus of robber flies in the family Asilidae.

== Species ==
These 10 species belong to the genus Satanas:

- Satanas agha Engel, 1934
- Satanas chan Engel, 1934
- Satanas fuscanipennis (Macquart, 1855)
- Satanas gigas (Eversmann, 1855)
- Satanas minor (Portschinsky, 1887)
- Satanas nigra Shi, Y, 1990
- Satanas niveus (Macquart, 1838)
- Satanas shah (Rondani, 1873)
- Satanas testaceicornis (Macquart, 1855)
- Satanas velox Lehr, 1963
