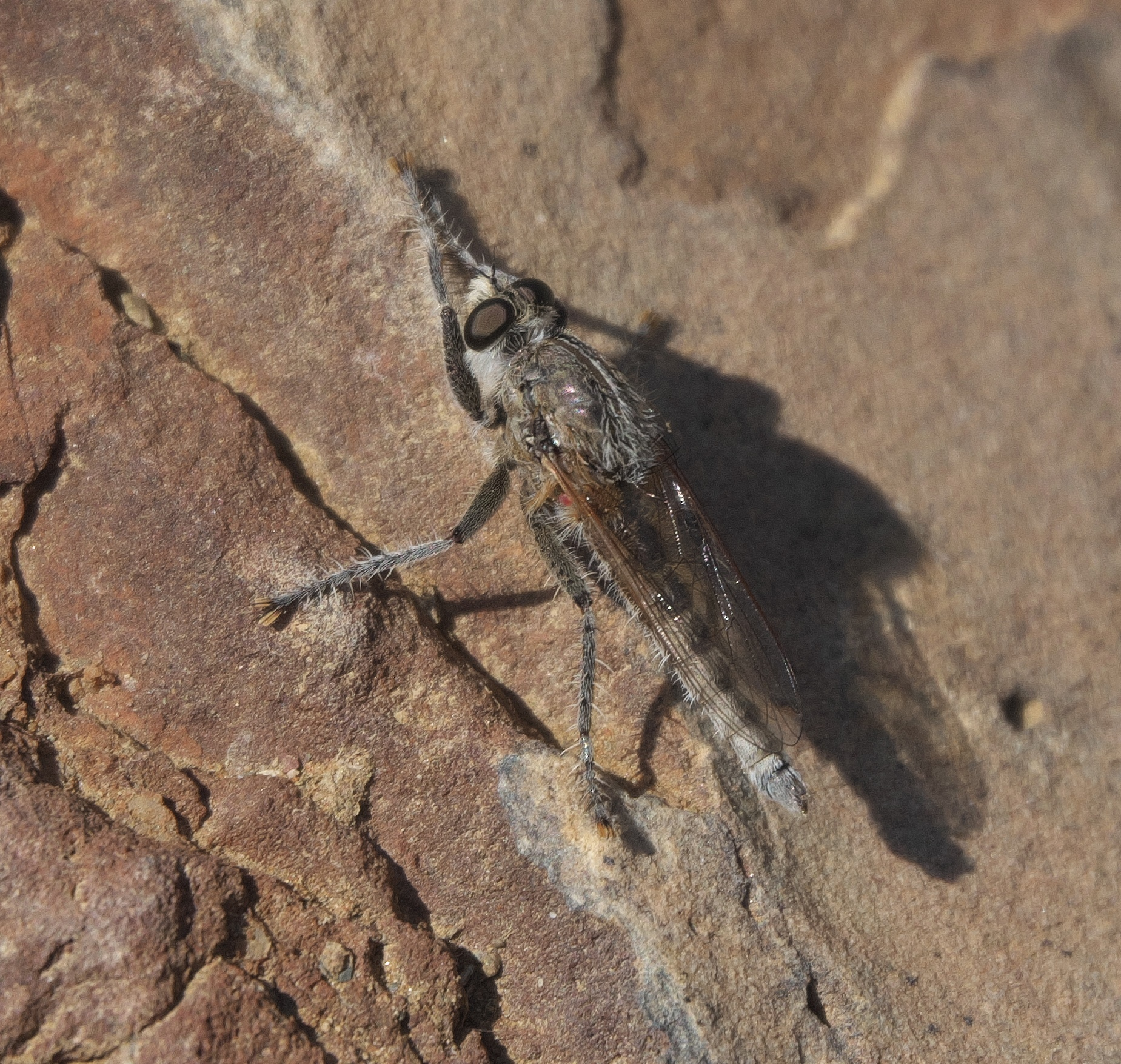
- Neolophonotus, Namibia

Scientific classification
- Kingdom: Animalia
- Phylum: Arthropoda
- Class: Insecta
- Order: Diptera
- Family: Asilidae
- Subfamily: Asilinae
- Genus: Neolophonotus; Engel, 1925

= Neolophonotus =

Genus of flies

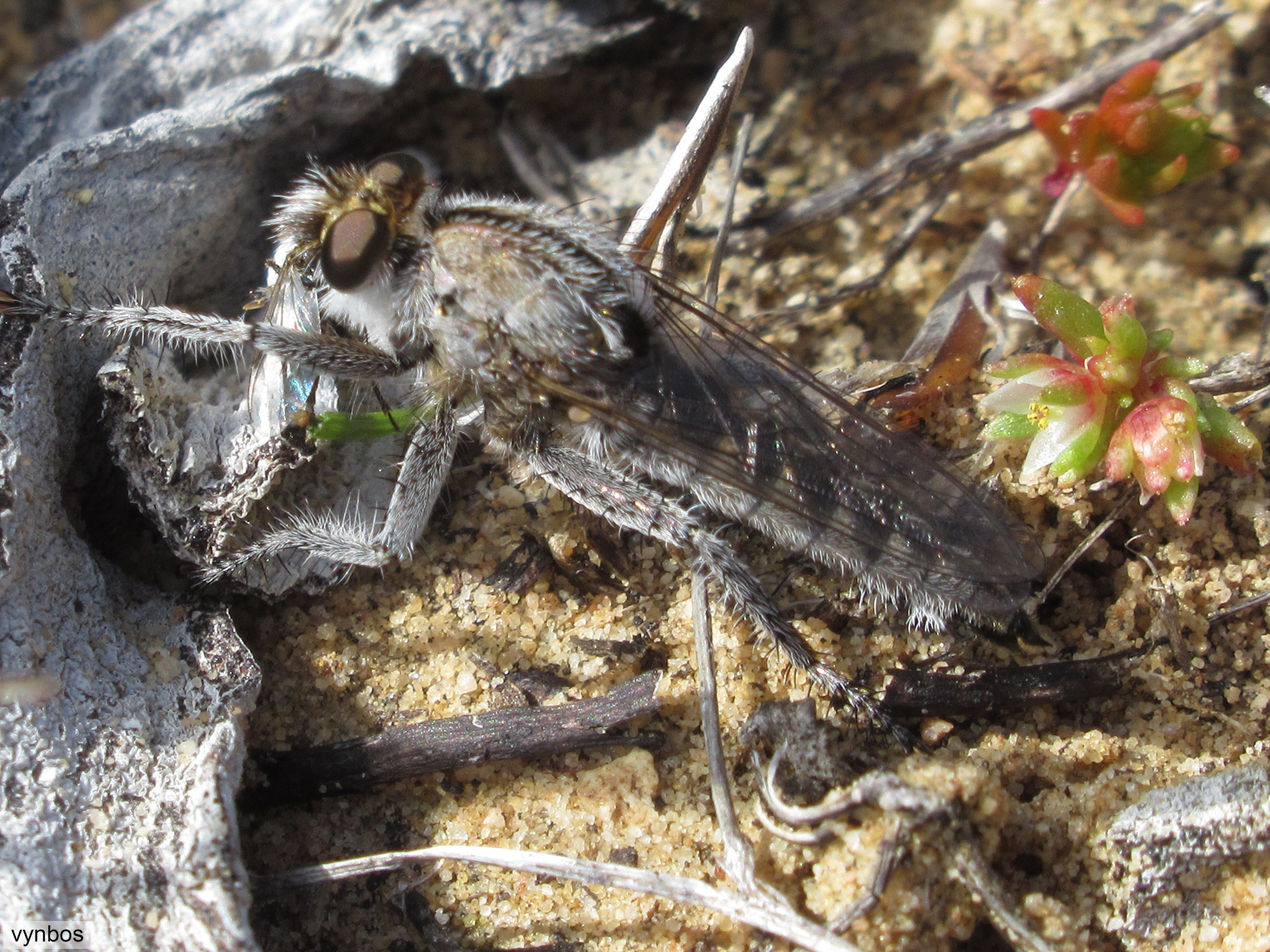
Neolophonotus, South Africa

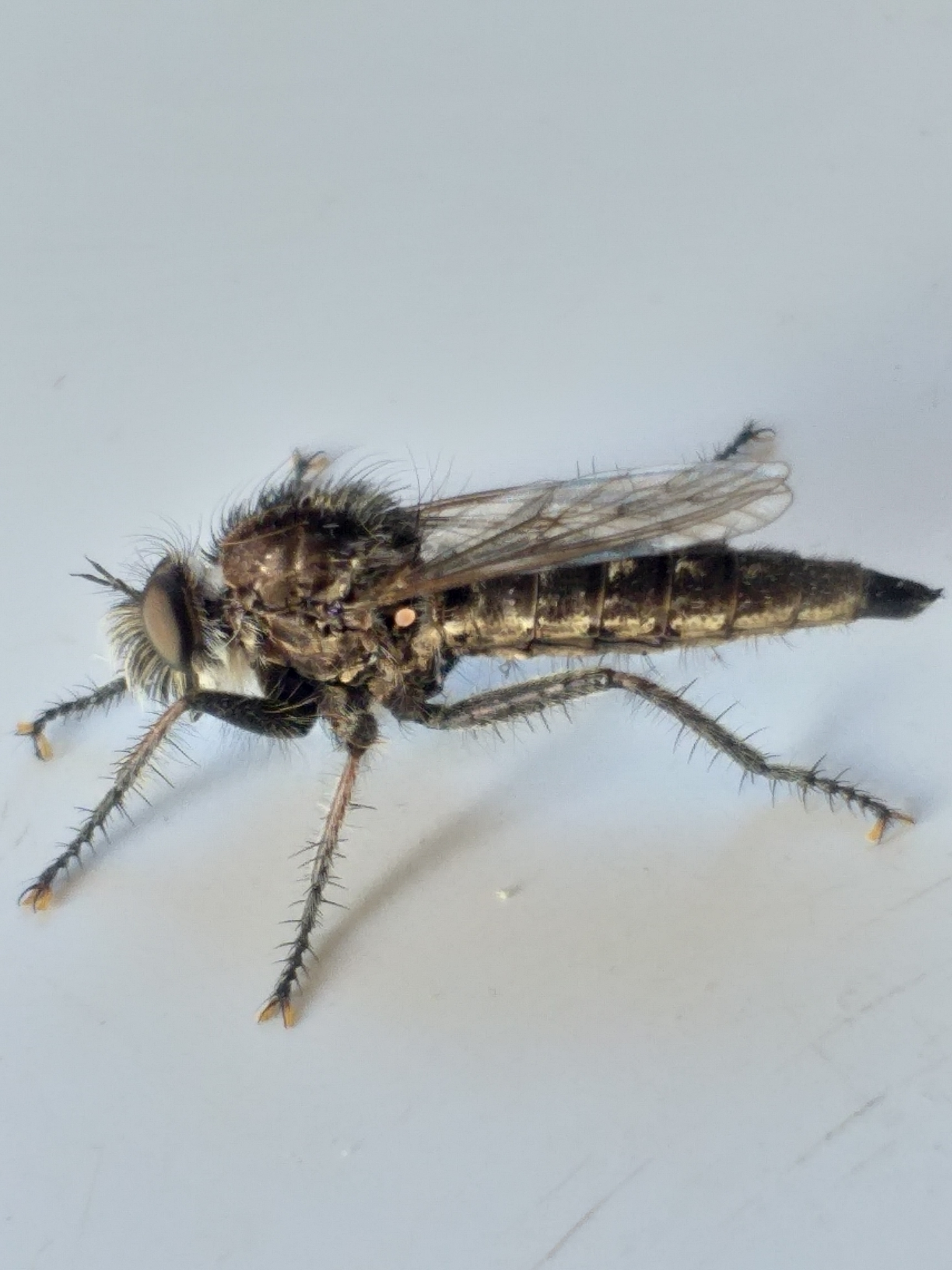
Neolophonotus, South Africa

Neolophonotus is a genus of robber flies in the family Asilidae. There are more than 280 described species in Neolophonotus, found in southern Africa.

== Species ==
These 283 species belong to the genus Neolophonotus:

- Neolophonotus abuntius (Walker, 1849)
- Neolophonotus acrolophus Londt, 1988
- Neolophonotus acrophilia Londt, 1988
- Neolophonotus acuminatus Londt, 1985
- Neolophonotus agrestis Londt, 1985
- Neolophonotus aktites Londt, 1985
- Neolophonotus albibarbis (Macquart, 1846)
- Neolophonotus albiciliatus (Loew, 1854)
- Neolophonotus albion (Curran, 1934)
- Neolophonotus albofasciatus (Ricardo, 1900)
- Neolophonotus albopilosus (Ricardo, 1920)
- Neolophonotus albus (Loew, 1858)
- Neolophonotus algidus Londt, 1988
- Neolophonotus amazanenes (Walker, 1849)
- Neolophonotus amplus Londt, 1985
- Neolophonotus anatolicus Londt, 1988
- Neolophonotus angola (Curran, 1934)
- Neolophonotus anguicolis Londt, 1985
- Neolophonotus angustibarbus (Loew, 1858)
- Neolophonotus annae Londt, 1988
- Neolophonotus annettae Londt, 1988
- Neolophonotus anomalus Londt, 1986
- Neolophonotus antidasophrys Londt, 1986
- Neolophonotus aphellas (Walker, 1849)
- Neolophonotus arboreus Londt, 1988
- Neolophonotus argyphus Londt, 1988
- Neolophonotus arno (Curran, 1934)
- Neolophonotus atopus Londt, 1986
- Neolophonotus atrox Londt, 1988
- Neolophonotus attenuatus Hull, 1967
- Neolophonotus aureolocus Londt, 1988
- Neolophonotus ausensis Londt, 1985
- Neolophonotus avus Londt, 1988
- Neolophonotus baeoura Londt, 1988
- Neolophonotus bamptoni Londt, 1987
- Neolophonotus bezzii Londt, 1986
- Neolophonotus bicuspis Londt, 1985
- Neolophonotus bigoti Londt, 1988
- Neolophonotus bimaculatus Londt, 1986
- Neolophonotus boa Londt, 1988
- Neolophonotus botswana Londt, 1988
- Neolophonotus braunsi Londt, 1986
- Neolophonotus brendani Londt, 1988
- Neolophonotus breonii (Macquart, 1838)
- Neolophonotus brevicauda Londt, 1985
- Neolophonotus bromleyi Londt, 1987
- Neolophonotus brunales Londt, 1988
- Neolophonotus carnifex Londt, 1988
- Neolophonotus carorum Londt, 1986
- Neolophonotus chaineyi Londt, 1986
- Neolophonotus chalcogaster (Wiedemann, 1819)
- Neolophonotus chrysopylus Londt, 1988
- Neolophonotus chubbii Bromley, 1947
- Neolophonotus circus Londt, 1988
- Neolophonotus clavulus Londt, 1988
- Neolophonotus coetzeei Londt, 1985
- Neolophonotus colubris Londt, 1988
- Neolophonotus comatus (Wiedemann, 1821)
- Neolophonotus congoensis (Ricardo, 1920)
- Neolophonotus coronatus Londt, 1987
- Neolophonotus costatus Londt, 1988
- Neolophonotus crassicolis Londt, 1985
- Neolophonotus crassifemoralis Londt, 1986
- Neolophonotus crenulatus Londt, 1985
- Neolophonotus crinitus Londt, 1986
- Neolophonotus cristatus Londt, 1988
- Neolophonotus culinarius Londt, 1985
- Neolophonotus cupreus (Loew, 1858)
- Neolophonotus currani Londt, 1988
- Neolophonotus cuthberstoni Curran, 1934
- Neolophonotus cuthbertsoni (Curran, 1934)
- Neolophonotus cymbius Londt, 1988
- Neolophonotus cynthiae Londt, 1988
- Neolophonotus declivicauda Londt, 1988
- Neolophonotus dentatus Tomasovic, 2009
- Neolophonotus depilis Londt, 1986
- Neolophonotus destructor Londt, 1988
- Neolophonotus diana Londt, 1988
- Neolophonotus dichaetus Hull, 1967
- Neolophonotus dispar (Engel, 1927)
- Neolophonotus dolabratus Londt, 1988
- Neolophonotus dondoensis Londt, 1986
- Neolophonotus dubius (Bezzi, 1892)
- Neolophonotus dysmicus Londt, 1988
- Neolophonotus efflatouni Londt, 1987
- Neolophonotus elgon Oldroyd, 1939
- Neolophonotus ellenbergeri Londt, 1988
- Neolophonotus engeli Londt, 1988
- Neolophonotus ensiculus Londt, 1987
- Neolophonotus expandocolis Londt, 1985
- Neolophonotus feijeni Londt, 1988
- Neolophonotus fimbriatus Hull, 1967
- Neolophonotus flavibarbis (Macquart, 1838)
- Neolophonotus flavopilosus (Ricardo, 1920)
- Neolophonotus floccus Londt, 1987
- Neolophonotus forcipatus (Macquart, 1838)
- Neolophonotus fumosus Londt, 1988
- Neolophonotus gemsbock Bromley, 1936
- Neolophonotus geniculatus (Macquart, 1838)
- Neolophonotus genitalis (Ricardo, 1925)
- Neolophonotus gertrudae Londt, 1985
- Neolophonotus gilvipilosus Londt, 1988
- Neolophonotus gorongoza Londt, 1988
- Neolophonotus gravicauda Londt, 1988
- Neolophonotus grossus Bromley, 1936
- Neolophonotus haplotherates Londt, 1987
- Neolophonotus hara Londt, 1986
- Neolophonotus hessei Londt, 1986
- Neolophonotus hilaryae Londt, 1988
- Neolophonotus hirtipes (Ricardo, 1920)
- Neolophonotus hobbyi Londt, 1988
- Neolophonotus holmi Londt, 1988
- Neolophonotus holoxanthus Engel, 1927
- Neolophonotus hulli Londt, 1988
- Neolophonotus hymenotelus Londt, 1988
- Neolophonotus incisuralis (Macquart, 1838)
- Neolophonotus incoladumetus Tomasovic & Constant, 2013
- Neolophonotus indicus Bromley, 1935
- Neolophonotus io Londt, 1986
- Neolophonotus iota Londt, 1988
- Neolophonotus iranensis (Londt, 1985)
- Neolophonotus irwini Londt, 1986
- Neolophonotus jubatus Londt, 1988
- Neolophonotus junodi Londt, 1985
- Neolophonotus kalahari Londt, 1985
- Neolophonotus karooensis Londt, 1987
- Neolophonotus kerteszi Londt, 1988
- Neolophonotus kolochaetes Londt, 1986
- Neolophonotus ktenistus Londt, 1986
- Neolophonotus labeonis Londt, 1988
- Neolophonotus labocuneatus Hull, 1967
- Neolophonotus lacustrinus Londt, 1988
- Neolophonotus ladon (Walker, 1849)
- Neolophonotus lasius Londt, 1988
- Neolophonotus lawrencei Londt, 1985
- Neolophonotus leechi Londt, 1988
- Neolophonotus leoninus (Schiner, 1867)
- Neolophonotus leptostylus Londt, 1988
- Neolophonotus leucodiadema Londt, 1988
- Neolophonotus leucopygus Engel, 1927
- Neolophonotus leucotaenia (Bezzi, 1906)
- Neolophonotus leucothrix Londt, 1985
- Neolophonotus lightfooti Londt, 1986
- Neolophonotus lindneri Londt, 1988
- Neolophonotus loewi Londt, 1988
- Neolophonotus loganius Londt, 1988
- Neolophonotus londti Bosák & Hradský, 2011
- Neolophonotus longicauda Londt, 1988
- Neolophonotus louisi Londt, 1986
- Neolophonotus macquarti Londt, 1986
- Neolophonotus macrocercus Londt, 1985
- Neolophonotus macromystax Londt, 1986
- Neolophonotus macropterus (Loew, 1854)
- Neolophonotus mafingaensis Londt, 1988
- Neolophonotus malawi Londt, 1988
- Neolophonotus mamathesiana (Bromley, 1947)
- Neolophonotus manselli Londt, 1986
- Neolophonotus margaracta Londt, 1988
- Neolophonotus marshalli Hobby, 1934
- Neolophonotus mediolocus Londt, 1988
- Neolophonotus megaphallus Londt, 1987
- Neolophonotus meiswinkeli Londt, 1988
- Neolophonotus melanolophus (Loew, 1858)
- Neolophonotus melanoura Londt, 1988
- Neolophonotus melinus Londt, 1987
- Neolophonotus membrana Londt, 1987
- Neolophonotus membraneus Londt, 1988
- Neolophonotus mesotopus Londt, 1988
- Neolophonotus midas Londt, 1988
- Neolophonotus milleri Londt, 1985
- Neolophonotus milvus Londt, 1988
- Neolophonotus minutus Hull, 1967
- Neolophonotus mivatus (Walker, 1871)
- Neolophonotus molestus Londt, 1988
- Neolophonotus molitor (Wiedemann, 1828)
- Neolophonotus montanus (Ricardo, 1920)
- Neolophonotus munroi Londt, 1987
- Neolophonotus namaqua Londt, 1985
- Neolophonotus namibiensis Londt, 1985
- Neolophonotus nanus (Bezzi, 1906)
- Neolophonotus natalensis (Ricardo, 1920)
- Neolophonotus necator Londt, 1988
- Neolophonotus nero Londt, 1988
- Neolophonotus nigricans (Ricardo, 1920)
- Neolophonotus nigripes (Ricardo, 1920)
- Neolophonotus nigriseta Londt, 1985
- Neolophonotus nisus Londt, 1988
- Neolophonotus niveus Londt, 1987
- Neolophonotus noas (Walker, 1849)
- Neolophonotus nodus Londt, 1988
- Neolophonotus notius Londt, 1988
- Neolophonotus obtectocolis Londt, 1985
- Neolophonotus obtusus Hull, 1967
- Neolophonotus occesilitus Londt, 1987
- Neolophonotus occidualis Londt, 1988
- Neolophonotus ochrochaetus Hull, 1967
- Neolophonotus oldroydi Londt, 1988
- Neolophonotus orientalis (Ricardo, 1920)
- Neolophonotus pachystylus Londt, 1988
- Neolophonotus papei Bosák & Hradský, 2011
- Neolophonotus parvus (Ricardo, 1920)
- Neolophonotus pellitus (Wiedemann, 1819)
- Neolophonotus penrithae Londt, 1988
- Neolophonotus percus Londt, 1988
- Neolophonotus pilosus Londt, 1986
- Neolophonotus pinheyi Londt, 1986
- Neolophonotus pollex Londt, 1987
- Neolophonotus porcellus (Speiser, 1910)
- Neolophonotus pulcher (Loew, 1858)
- Neolophonotus pusillus Londt, 1988
- Neolophonotus quickelbergei Londt, 1988
- Neolophonotus ramus Londt, 1988
- Neolophonotus rapax (Ricardo, 1920)
- Neolophonotus raptor Londt, 1988
- Neolophonotus raymondi Londt, 1987
- Neolophonotus rhodesiensis (Hobby, 1933)
- Neolophonotus rhodesii (Ricardo, 1920)
- Neolophonotus rhopalotus Londt, 1988
- Neolophonotus roberti Londt, 1990
- Neolophonotus robertsoni Londt, 1985
- Neolophonotus robustus (Ricardo, 1922)
- Neolophonotus rolandi Londt, 1985
- Neolophonotus rossi Londt, 1986
- Neolophonotus rudi Londt, 1988
- Neolophonotus rufulus Oldroyd, 1980
- Neolophonotus rufus (Macquart, 1838)
- Neolophonotus salina Londt, 1987
- Neolophonotus sanchorus Londt, 1987
- Neolophonotus satanus Londt, 1987
- Neolophonotus saxatilus Londt, 1988
- Neolophonotus schalki Londt, 1985
- Neolophonotus schoemani Londt, 1985
- Neolophonotus schofieldi Londt, 1988
- Neolophonotus setiventris (Loew, 1858)
- Neolophonotus seymourae Londt, 1986
- Neolophonotus sicarius Londt, 1988
- Neolophonotus similis (Ricardo, 1920)
- Neolophonotus sinis Londt, 1988
- Neolophonotus sinuvena Londt, 1987
- Neolophonotus somali Londt, 1990
- Neolophonotus soutpanensis Londt, 1986
- Neolophonotus spinicaudata Londt, 1985
- Neolophonotus spiniventris (Loew, 1858)
- Neolophonotus spinosus Londt, 1988
- Neolophonotus spoliator Londt, 1987
- Neolophonotus squamosus Londt, 1985
- Neolophonotus stannus (Ricardo, 1925)
- Neolophonotus stevensoni Londt, 1985
- Neolophonotus struthaulon Londt, 1987
- Neolophonotus stuckenbergi Londt, 1986
- Neolophonotus suillus (Fabricius, 1805)
- Neolophonotus swaensis Londt, 1985
- Neolophonotus tanymedus Londt, 1986
- Neolophonotus tarsalis (Ricardo, 1920)
- Neolophonotus theroni Londt, 1985
- Neolophonotus tibialis (Macquart, 1838)
- Neolophonotus torridus Londt, 1985
- Neolophonotus transvaalensis (Ricardo, 1920)
- Neolophonotus tribulosus Londt, 1988
- Neolophonotus trilobius Londt, 1985
- Neolophonotus truncatus Londt, 1985
- Neolophonotus umbrivena Londt, 1987
- Neolophonotus uncinus Londt, 1988
- Neolophonotus unicalamus Londt, 1987
- Neolophonotus ursinus (Schiner, 1867)
- Neolophonotus vansoni Bromley, 1936
- Neolophonotus variabilis Londt, 1986
- Neolophonotus variegatus Londt, 1988
- Neolophonotus vermiculatus Londt, 1988
- Neolophonotus vincenti Londt, 1988
- Neolophonotus virescens Engel, 1927
- Neolophonotus walkeri Londt, 1988
- Neolophonotus wiedemanni Londt, 1988
- Neolophonotus wroughtoni (Ricardo, 1920)
- Neolophonotus xanthodasus Londt, 1988
- Neolophonotus xiphichaetus Hull, 1967
- Neolophonotus zambiensis Londt, 1986
- Neolophonotus zigzag Londt, 1988
- Neolophonotus zimbabwe Londt, 1985
- Neolophonotus zogreus Londt, 1986
- Neolophonotus zopherus Londt, 1986
- Neolophonotus zulu Londt, 1985
- † Neolophonotus klebsi (Meunier, 1908)
