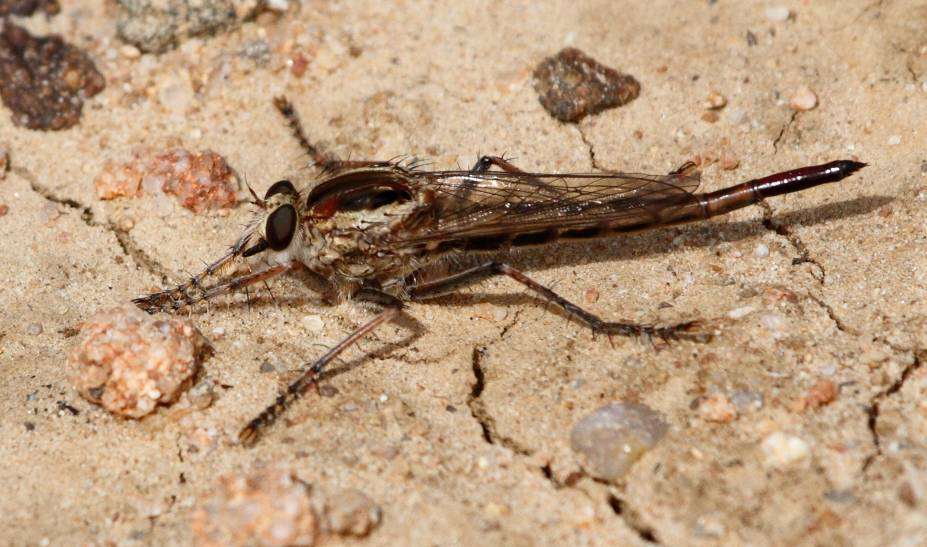
- Alcimus female

Scientific classification
- Domain: Eukaryota
- Kingdom: Animalia
- Phylum: Arthropoda
- Class: Insecta
- Order: Diptera
- Family: Asilidae
- Subfamily: Asilinae
- Genus: Alcimus; Loew, 1848

= Alcimus (fly) =

Genus of flies

Alcimus is a genus of flies in the family Asilidae, the robber flies and assassin flies. There are about 26 species which are native to the Afrotropics.

These are slim, elongate robber flies; the thorax appears broad relative to the abdomen. Their colouring generally includes black or dark brown streaking on a chestnut matrix.

Most species in this genus are adapted to life on bare ground, but they are also often found resting on the upper parts of bushes. Robber flies are predators, and those in the genus Alcimus prey on a wide variety of arthropods; grasshoppers and lepidoptera comprise a large part of their diet.

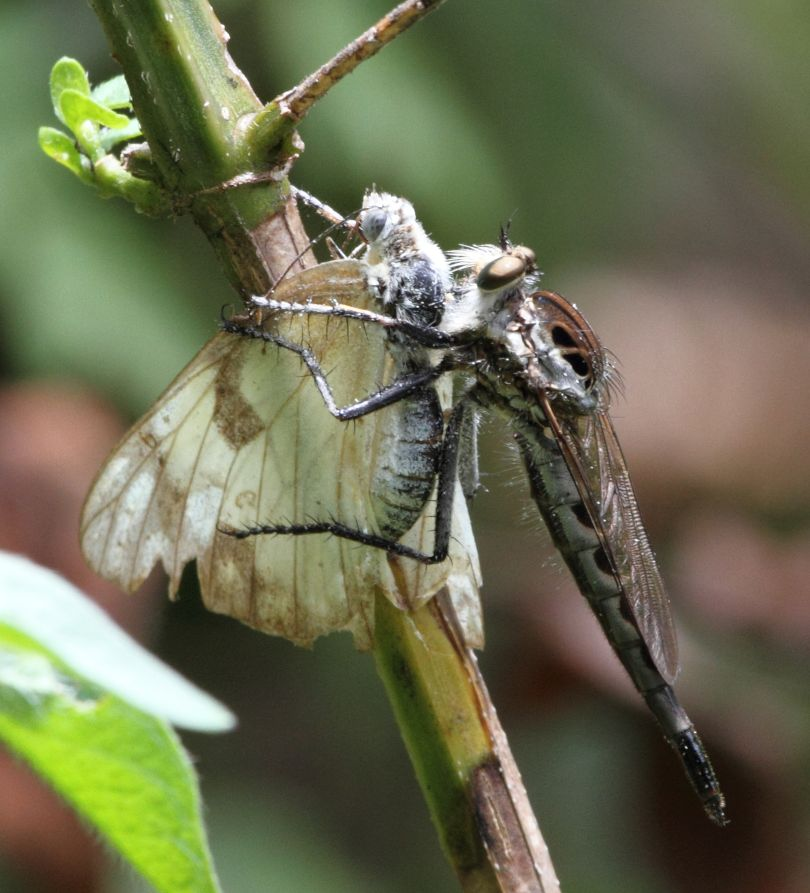
Female with butterfly prey

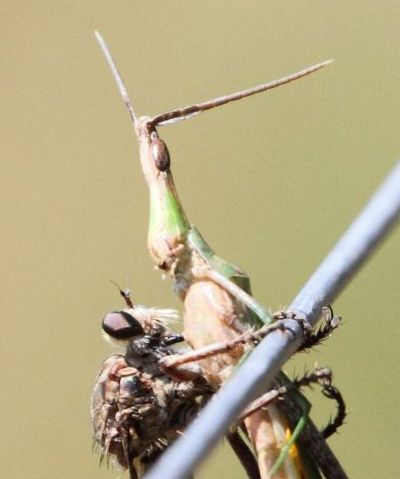
Alcimus with grasshopper prey

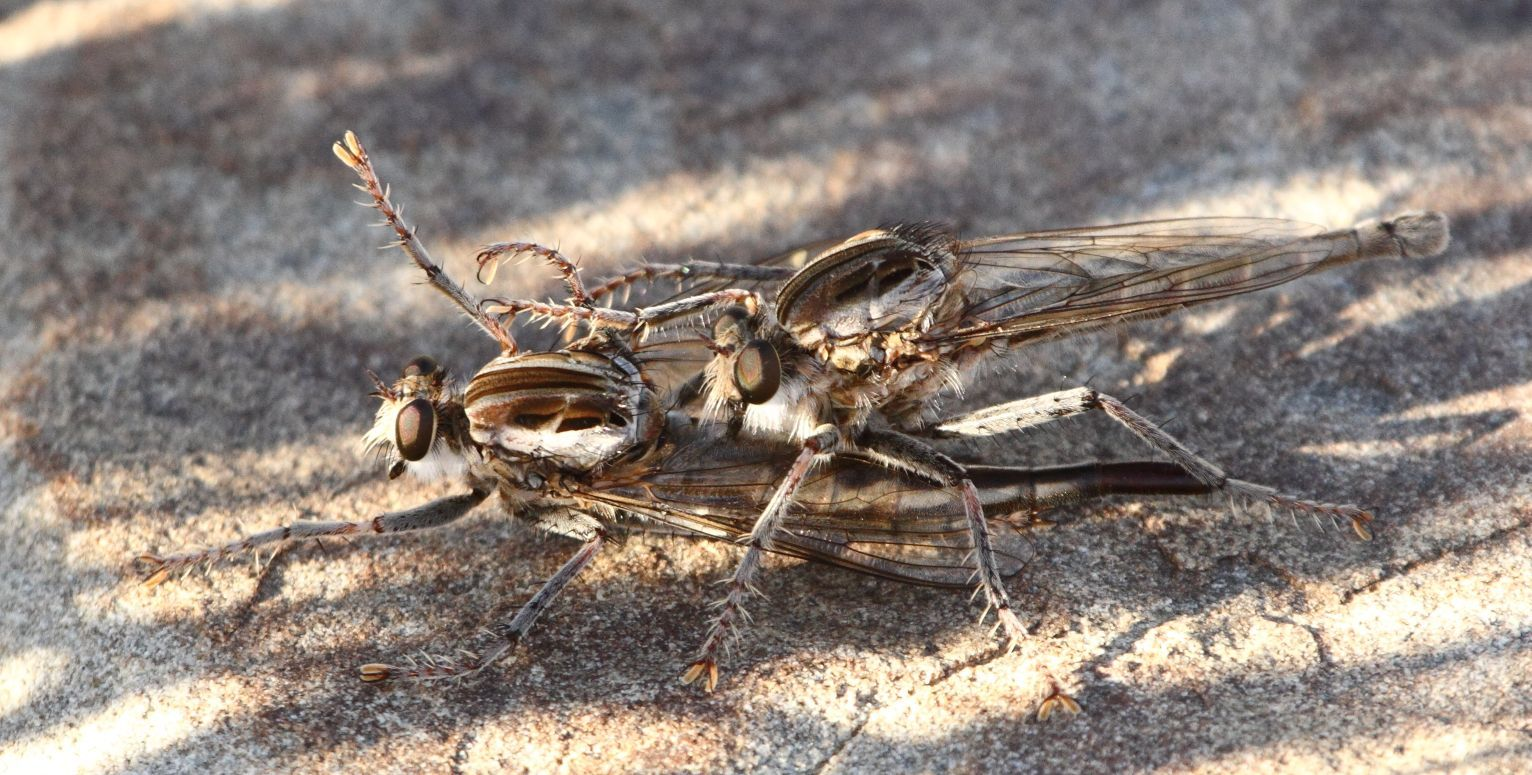
Male Alcimus with female Alcimus prey
