= Itolia =

Scientific classification
- Kingdom: Animalia
- Phylum: Arthropoda
- Class: Insecta
- Order: Diptera
- Family: Asilidae
- Subfamily: Stenopogoninae
- Genus: Itolia; Wilcox, 1936

Genus of flies

Itolia is a genus of robber flies in the family Asilidae. There are about five described species in Itolia.

== Species ==
These five species belong to the genus Itolia:

- Itolia atripes Wilcox, 1949^{i c g}
- Itolia fascia Martin, 1966^{c g}
- Itolia maculata Wilcox, 1936^{i c g b}
- Itolia pilosa Martin, 1966^{c g}
- Itolia timberlakei Wilcox, 1949^{i c g}

Data sources: i = ITIS, c = Catalogue of Life, g = GBIF, b = Bugguide.net
