= Lophonotus (fly) =

Scientific classification
- Domain: Eukaryota
- Kingdom: Animalia
- Phylum: Arthropoda
- Class: Insecta
- Order: Diptera
- Family: Asilidae
- Genus: Lophonotus (Maquart, 1828)

Genus of flies

Lophonotus is a genus of robber flies in the family Asilidae.
