= Hadrokolos =

Scientific classification
- Domain: Eukaryota
- Kingdom: Animalia
- Phylum: Arthropoda
- Class: Insecta
- Order: Diptera
- Family: Asilidae
- Subfamily: Stenopogoninae
- Genus: Hadrokolos; Martin, 1959

Genus of flies

Hadrokolos is a genus of robber flies in the family Asilidae. There are at least four described species in Hadrokolos.

== Species ==
These four species belong to the genus Hadrokolos:

- Hadrokolos cazieri Martin, 1959^{i c g}
- Hadrokolos notialis Martin, 1967^{c g}
- Hadrokolos pritchardi Martin, 1959^{i c g}
- Hadrokolos texanus (Bromley, 1934)^{i c g b}

Data sources: i = ITIS, c = Catalogue of Life, g = GBIF, b = Bugguide.net
