= Eclipsis (fly) =

Scientific classification
- Kingdom: Animalia
- Phylum: Arthropoda
- Class: Insecta
- Order: Diptera
- Family: Asilidae
- Genus: Eclipsis

Genus of flies

Eclipsis is a genus of robber flies in the family Asilidae. There is at least one described species in Eclipsis, E. maculiventris.
