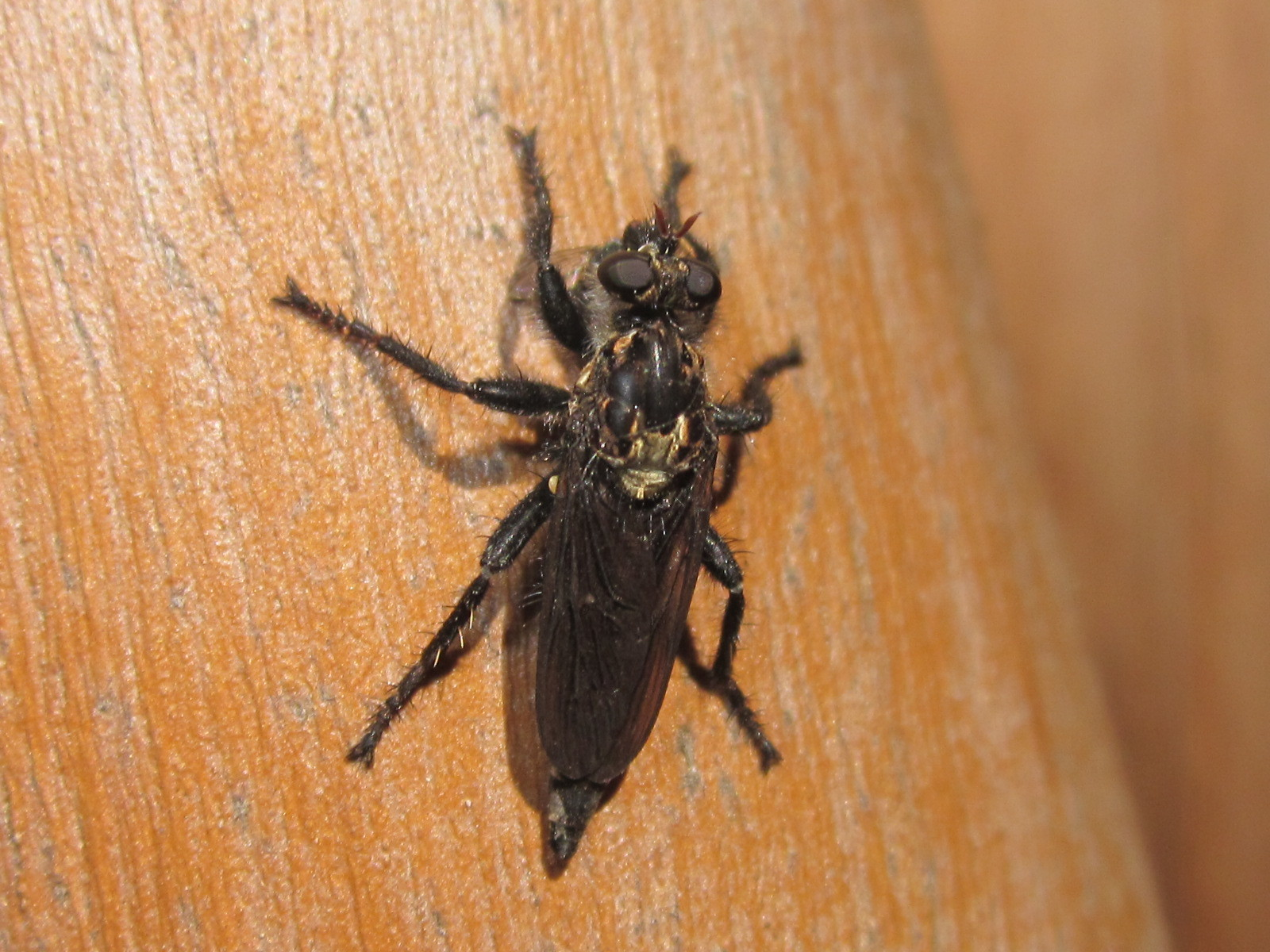
- Pritchardia hirtipes

Scientific classification
- Domain: Eukaryota
- Kingdom: Animalia
- Phylum: Arthropoda
- Class: Insecta
- Order: Diptera
- Family: Asilidae
- Subfamily: Stenopogoninae
- Genus: Pritchardia; Gardner, Agustín Jimenez & Campbell, 2013

= Pritchardia (fly) =

Genus of flies

Pritchardia is a genus of robber flies in the family Asilidae. There are about six described species in Pritchardia.

== Species ==
These six species belong to the genus Pritchardia:

- Pritchardia boliviensis Scott L.Gardner, F.Agustín Jiménez & Mariel L.Campbell, 2013^{g}
- Pritchardia curicoensis Artigas, 1970^{c g}
- Pritchardia hirtipes (Macquart, 1838)^{c}
- Pritchardia lopesi Carrera & Papavero, 1965^{c g}
- Pritchardia puella Bromley, 1932^{c g}
- Pritchardia tertialis (Bromley, 1932)^{c g}

Data sources: i = ITIS, c = Catalogue of Life, g = GBIF, b = Bugguide.net
