= Chrysopogon (fly) =

Scientific classification
- Domain: Eukaryota
- Kingdom: Animalia
- Phylum: Arthropoda
- Class: Insecta
- Order: Diptera
- Family: Asilidae
- Genus: Chrysopogon

Genus of flies

Chrysopogon is a genus of robber flies in the family Asilidae. There are at least 40 described species in Chrysopogon.

== Species ==
These 43 species belong to the genus Chrysopogon:

- Chrysopogon agilis Clements, 1985^{c g}
- Chrysopogon albopunctatus (Macquart, 1846)^{c g}
- Chrysopogon albosetosus Clements, 1985^{c g}
- Chrysopogon aureocinctus Clements, 1985^{c g}
- Chrysopogon aureus Clements, 1985^{c g}
- Chrysopogon bellus Clements, 1985^{c g}
- Chrysopogon bicolor Clements, 1985^{c g}
- Chrysopogon brunnipes Clements, 1985^{c g}
- Chrysopogon castaneus Clements, 1985^{c g}
- Chrysopogon catachrysus Clements, 1985^{c g}
- Chrysopogon conopsoides (Fabricius, 1775)^{c g}
- Chrysopogon crabroniformis Roder, 1881^{c g}
- Chrysopogon daptes Clements, 1985^{c g}
- Chrysopogon dialeucus Clements, 1985^{c g}
- Chrysopogon diaphanes Clements, 1985^{c g}
- Chrysopogon fasciatus Ricardo, 1912^{c g}
- Chrysopogon fuscus Clements, 1985^{c g}
- Chrysopogon gammonensis Lavigne, 2006^{c g}
- Chrysopogon harpaleus Clements, 1985^{c g}
- Chrysopogon horni Hardy, 1934^{c g}
- Chrysopogon leucodema Clements, 1985^{c g}
- Chrysopogon megalius Clements, 1985^{c g}
- Chrysopogon melanorrhinus Clements, 1985^{c g}
- Chrysopogon melas Clements, 1985^{c g}
- Chrysopogon micrus Clements, 1985^{c g}
- Chrysopogon muelleri Roder, 1892^{c g}
- Chrysopogon pallidipennis White, 1918^{c g}
- Chrysopogon papuensis Clements, 1985^{c g}
- Chrysopogon paramonovi Clements, 1985^{c g}
- Chrysopogon parvus Clements, 1985^{c g}
- Chrysopogon pellos Clements, 1985^{c g}
- Chrysopogon pilosifacies Clements, 1985^{c g}
- Chrysopogon proximus Clements, 1985^{c g}
- Chrysopogon punctatus Ricardo, 1912^{c g}
- Chrysopogon queenslandi Ricardo, 1912^{c g}
- Chrysopogon rubidipennis White, 1918^{c g}
- Chrysopogon rufulus White, 1914^{c g}
- Chrysopogon rutilus Clements, 1985^{c g}
- Chrysopogon sphecodes Clements, 1985^{c g}
- Chrysopogon splendidissimus Ricardo, 1912^{c g}
- Chrysopogon trianguliferus Clements, 1985^{c g}
- Chrysopogon whitei Hull, 1958^{c g}
- Chrysopogon xanthus Clements, 1985^{c g}

Data sources: i = ITIS, c = Catalogue of Life, g = GBIF, b = Bugguide.net
