= Dicropaltum =

Scientific classification
- Domain: Eukaryota
- Kingdom: Animalia
- Phylum: Arthropoda
- Class: Insecta
- Order: Diptera
- Family: Asilidae
- Subfamily: Asilinae
- Genus: Dicropaltum; Martin, 1975

Genus of flies

Dicropaltum is a genus of robber flies in the family Asilidae. There are about six described species in Dicropaltum.

== Species ==
These six species belong to the genus Dicropaltum:

- Dicropaltum alamosae Martin, 1975^{c g}
- Dicropaltum cumbipilosus (Adisoemarto, 1967)^{i c g}
- Dicropaltum humilis (Bellardi, 1861)^{i c g}
- Dicropaltum mesae (Tucker, 1907)^{i c g}
- Dicropaltum pawneeae Martin, 1975^{c g}
- Dicropaltum rubicundus (Hine, 1909)^{i c g b}

Data sources: i = ITIS, c = Catalogue of Life, g = GBIF, b = Bugguide.net
