= Wilcoxia (fly) =

Scientific classification
- Domain: Eukaryota
- Kingdom: Animalia
- Phylum: Arthropoda
- Class: Insecta
- Order: Diptera
- Family: Asilidae
- Subfamily: Stenopogoninae
- Genus: Wilcoxia; James, 1941

Genus of flies

Wilcoxia is a genus of robber flies in the family Asilidae. There are about five described species in Wilcoxia.

== Species ==
These five species belong to the genus Wilcoxia:

- Wilcoxia cinerea James, 1941^{i c g}
- Wilcoxia martinorum Wilcox, 1972^{i c g}
- Wilcoxia monae Wilcox, 1972^{i c g}
- Wilcoxia painteri Wilcox, 1972^{i c g}
- Wilcoxia pollinosa Wilcox, 1972^{i c g}

Data sources: i = ITIS, c = Catalogue of Life, g = GBIF, b = Bugguide.net
