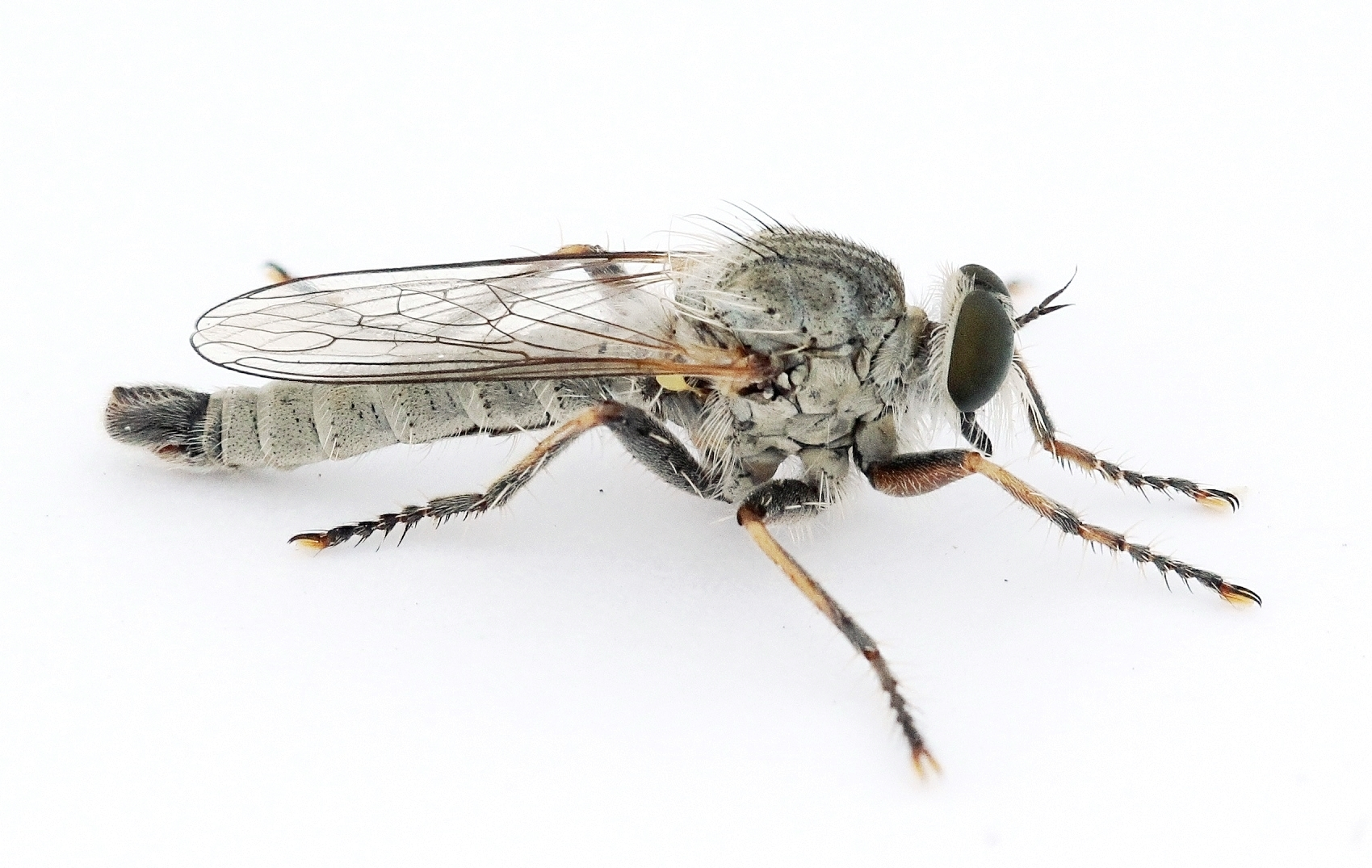

Scientific classification
- Kingdom: Animalia
- Phylum: Arthropoda
- Class: Insecta
- Order: Diptera
- Family: Asilidae
- Subfamily: Asilinae
- Genus: Ktyr; Lehr, 1967

= Ktyr (fly) =

Genus of flies

Ktyr is an Old World genus of robber flies in the family Asilidae.

== Species ==
- Ktyr callarus Lehr, 1981
- Ktyr caucasicus (Richter, 1963)
- Ktyr elegans Lehr, 1972
- Ktyr junctus (Becker, 1923)
- Ktyr kazenasi Lehr, 1981
- Ktyr kerzhneri (Lehr, 1972)
- Ktyr normalis Lehr, 1981
- Ktyr protensis Lehr, 1981
