= Anarmostus =

Scientific classification
- Domain: Eukaryota
- Kingdom: Animalia
- Phylum: Arthropoda
- Class: Insecta
- Order: Diptera
- Family: Asilidae
- Genus: Anarmostus; Loew, 1860
- Species: A. iopterus

Binomial name
- Anarmostus iopterus (Wiedemann, 1828)

Genus of flies

Anarmostus is a monotypic genus of flies belonging to the family Asilidae. The only species is Anarmostus iopterus.

The species is found in Central and South America.
