= Promachella =

Scientific classification
- Domain: Eukaryota
- Kingdom: Animalia
- Phylum: Arthropoda
- Class: Insecta
- Order: Diptera
- Family: Asilidae
- Genus: Promachella; Cole & Pritchard, 1964
- Species: P. pilosa

Binomial name
- Promachella pilosa (Wilcox, 1937)

Genus of flies

Promachella is a genus of robber flies in the family Asilidae. There is at least one described species in Promachella, P. pilosa.
