= Lecania (fly) =

Scientific classification
- Domain: Eukaryota
- Kingdom: Animalia
- Phylum: Arthropoda
- Class: Insecta
- Order: Diptera
- Family: Asilidae
- Genus: Lecania; Macquart, 1839

Genus of flies

Lecania is a genus of robber flies in the family Asilidae. There are about five described species in Lecania.

== Species ==
These five species belong to the genus Lecania:

- Lecania boraceae Carrera, 1958^{c g}
- Lecania ctesicles (Walker, 1851)^{c g}
- Lecania femorata Macquart, 1838^{c g}
- Lecania leucopyga (Wiedemann, 1828)^{c g}
- Lecania tabescens Rondani, 1875^{c g}

Data sources: i = ITIS, c = Catalogue of Life, g = GBIF, b = Bugguide.net
