= Asiola (fly) =

Scientific classification
- Domain: Eukaryota
- Kingdom: Animalia
- Phylum: Arthropoda
- Class: Insecta
- Order: Diptera
- Family: Asilidae
- Genus: Asiola

Genus of flies

Asiola is a genus of robber flies in the family Asilidae. There are at least four described species in Asiola.

== Species ==
These four species belong to the genus Asiola:

- Asiola atkinsi Daniels, 1977^{c g}
- Asiola blasio (Walker, 1849)^{c g}
- Asiola fasciata Daniels, 1977^{c g}
- Asiola lemniscata Daniels, 1977^{c g}

Data sources: i = ITIS, c = Catalogue of Life, g = GBIF, b = Bugguide.net
