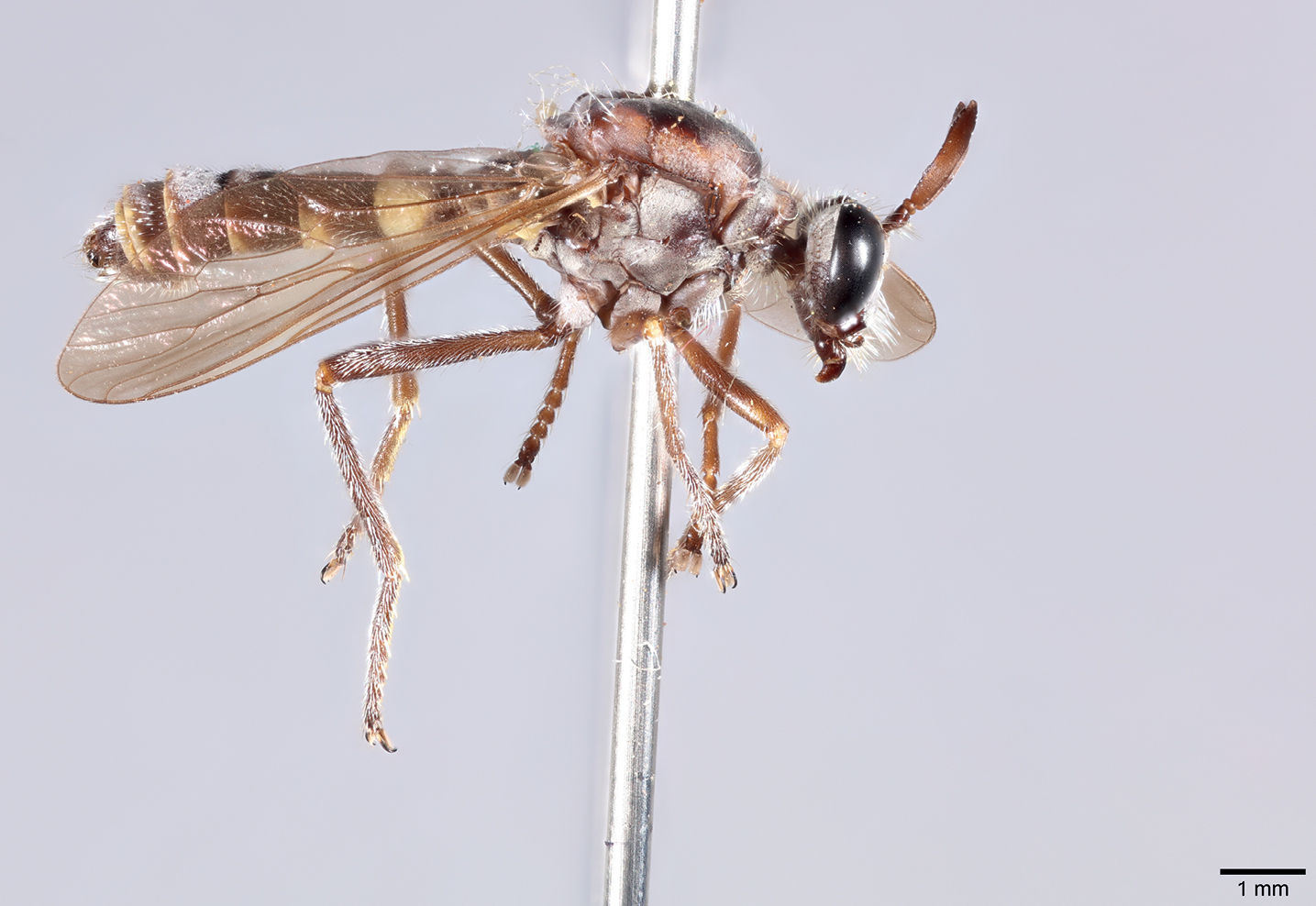
- Ancylorhynchus greatheadi

Scientific classification
- Kingdom: Animalia
- Phylum: Arthropoda
- Clade: Pancrustacea
- Class: Insecta
- Order: Diptera
- Family: Asilidae
- Genus: Ancylorhynchus; Berthold, 1827

= Ancylorhynchus =

Genus of flies

Ancylorhynchus is a genus of robber flies belonging to the family Asilidae. The genus was first described by Arnold Adolph Berthold in 1827. Many species are colorful and wasplike.

Species of this genus are found in Afrotropical, Palaearctic, Australasian, Oceanian and Oriental regions.

== Species ==
Species include:

- Ancylorhynchus argyroaster (Seguy, 1932)
- Ancylorhynchus bicolor (Becker & Stein, 1913)
- Ancylorhynchus braunsi Bromley, 1936
- Ancylorhynchus brussensis (Schiner, 1867)
- Ancylorhynchus cambodgiensis Tomasovic, 2007
- Ancylorhynchus cingulatus (Rondani, 1845)
- Ancylorhynchus complacitus (Wulp, 1872)
- Ancylorhynchus dilobion Londt, 2011
- Ancylorhynchus doryphorus Londt, 2011
- Ancylorhynchus elbaiensis Efflatoun, 1937
- Ancylorhynchus farinosus (Becker & Stein, 1913)
- Ancylorhynchus feijeni Londt, 2011
- Ancylorhynchus fulvicollis (Bigot, 1878)
- Ancylorhynchus funebris Bromley, 1936
- Ancylorhynchus greatheadi Londt, 2011
- Ancylorhynchus glaucius (Rossi, 1790)
- Ancylorhynchus gessi Londt, 2011
- Ancylorhynchus gummigutta (Becker, 1906)
- Ancylorhynchus humeralis (Wiedemann, 1821)
- Ancylorhynchus hylaeiformis Speiser, 1910
- Ancylorhynchus insignis Bromley, 1936
- Ancylorhynchus limbatus (Fabricius, 1794)
- Ancylorhynchus longicornis (Schiner, 1867)
- Ancylorhynchus maculatus (Bigot, 1878)
- Ancylorhynchus magnificus Bromley, 1936
- Ancylorhynchus minus (Shi, 1995)
- Ancylorhynchus nomadus (Wiedemann, 1828)
- Ancylorhynchus nyukinus Speiser, 1910
- Ancylorhynchus oldroydi Lindner, 1961
- Ancylorhynchus orientalis (Shi, 1995)
- Ancylorhynchus percheronii (Macquart, 1834)
- Ancylorhynchus phelpsi Londt, 2011
- Ancylorhynchus plecioides Meijere, 1913
- Ancylorhynchus pretoriensis Bromley, 1936
- Ancylorhynchus prunus Oldroyd, 1974
- Ancylorhynchus reynaudii (Macquart, 1838)
- Ancylorhynchus rufipes Meijere, 1913
- Ancylorhynchus rufithorax (Doleschall, 1858)
- Ancylorhynchus rufocinctus (Séguy, 1929)
- Ancylorhynchus senes (Dufour, 1833)
- Ancylorhynchus similis Londt, 2011
- Ancylorhynchus simpsoni Londt, 2011
- Ancylorhynchus snowi Londt, 2011
- Ancylorhynchus sokokensis Londt, 2011
- Ancylorhynchus susurrus (Karsch, 1879)
- Ancylorhynchus tricolor (Loew, 1863)
- Ancylorhynchus tristis (Séguy, 1932)
- Ancylorhynchus unifasciatus (Loew, 1858)
- Ancylorhynchus variabilis Londt, 2011
- Ancylorhynchus vultur (Séguy, 1930)
- Ancylorhynchus whiteheadi Londt, 2011
- Ancylorhynchus zophos Londt, 2011
