= Bana (fly) =

Scientific classification
- Domain: Eukaryota
- Kingdom: Animalia
- Phylum: Arthropoda
- Class: Insecta
- Order: Diptera
- Family: Asilidae
- Genus: Bana

Genus of flies

Bana is a genus of robber flies in the family Asilidae, found in southern Africa. There are at least two described species in Bana.

== Species ==
These two species belong to the genus Bana:

- Bana apicida Londt, 1992
- Bana madiba Londt, 2013
