= Pritchardomyia =

Scientific classification
- Domain: Eukaryota
- Kingdom: Animalia
- Phylum: Arthropoda
- Class: Insecta
- Order: Diptera
- Family: Asilidae
- Genus: Pritchardomyia; Wilcox, 1965
- Species: P. vespoides

Binomial name
- Pritchardomyia vespoides (Bigot, 1878)

Genus of flies

Pritchardomyia is a genus of robber flies (insects in the family Asilidae). There is at least one described species in Pritchardomyia, P. vespoides.
