= Zoticus (fly) =

Scientific classification
- Kingdom: Animalia
- Phylum: Arthropoda
- Class: Insecta
- Order: Diptera
- Family: Asilidae
- Genus: Zoticus; Artigas, 1970
- Species: Z. toconaoensis

Binomial name
- Zoticus toconaoensis Artigas, 1970

Genus of flies

Zoticus is a genus of robber flies in the family Asilidae. It is monotypic, the sole species being Zoticus toconaoensis. It is known from Chile.

Some sources include a second species, Zoticus fitzroyi (Artigas, 1974).
