= Neodioctria =

Scientific classification
- Domain: Eukaryota
- Kingdom: Animalia
- Phylum: Arthropoda
- Class: Insecta
- Order: Diptera
- Family: Asilidae
- Genus: Neodioctria; Ricardo, 1918

Genus of insects

Neodioctria is a genus of flies belonging to the family Asilidae.

The species of this genus are found in Australia.

Species:

- Neodioctria australis Ricardo, 1918
