= Artigasus =

Scientific classification
- Domain: Eukaryota
- Kingdom: Animalia
- Phylum: Arthropoda
- Class: Insecta
- Order: Diptera
- Family: Asilidae
- Genus: Artigasus; Özdikmen, 2010

Synonyms
- Menexenus Artigas, 1970

Genus of flies

Artigasus is a genus of robber flies in the family Asilidae.

== Species ==
- Artigasus concepcionensis (Bromley, 1932)
- Artigasus schlingeri (Artigas, 1982)
- Artigasus veredus (Artigas, 1970)
