= Eremonotus (fly) =

Scientific classification
- Domain: Eukaryota
- Kingdom: Animalia
- Phylum: Arthropoda
- Class: Insecta
- Order: Diptera
- Family: Asilidae
- Genus: Eremonotus; Theodor, 1980

Genus of insects

Eremonotus is a genus of flies belonging to the family Asilidae.

Species:

- Eremonotus hauseri Geller-Grimm & Hradsky, 1998
- Eremonotus nudus Theodor, 1980
