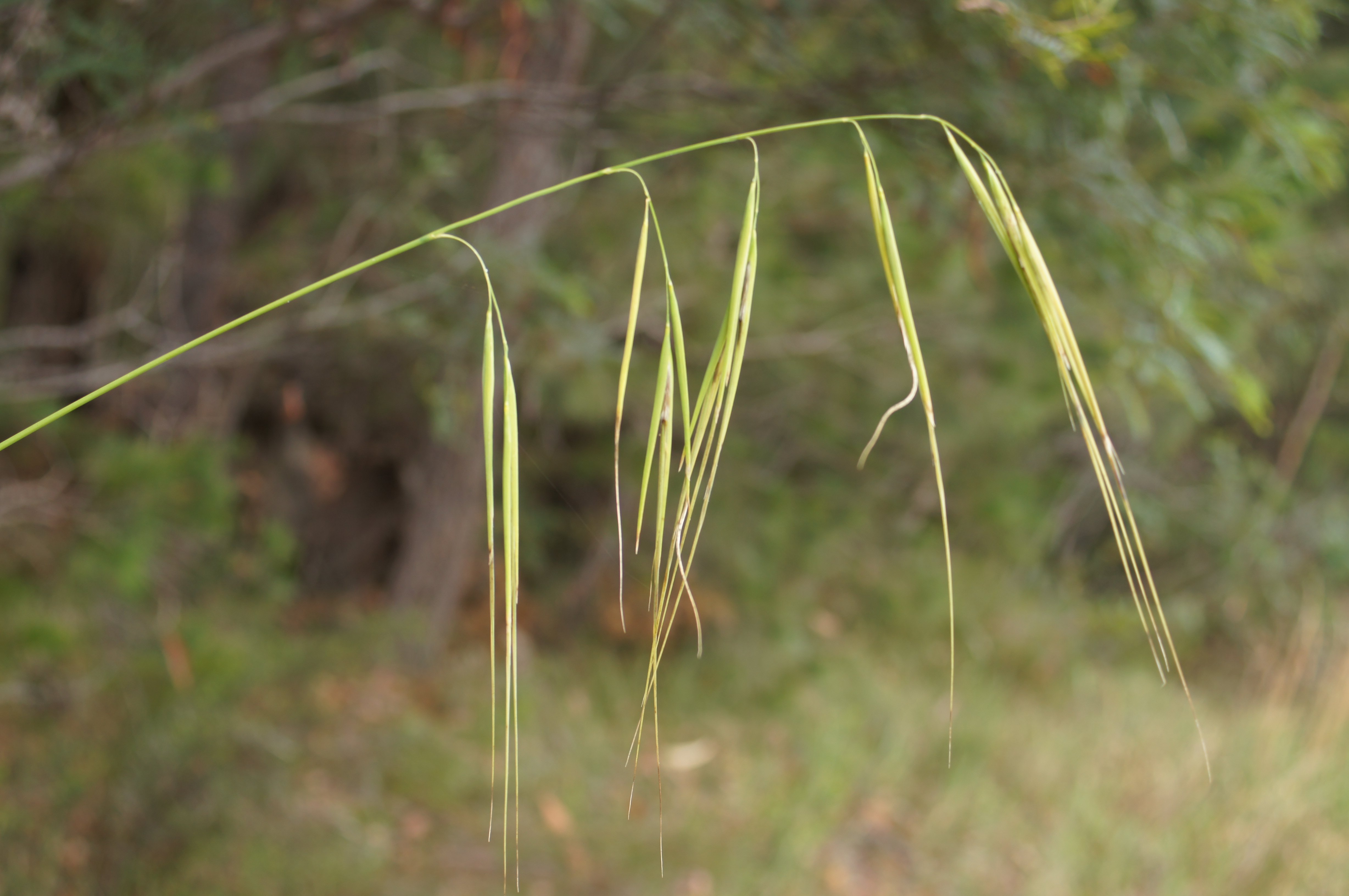

Scientific classification
- Domain: Eukaryota
- Kingdom: Animalia
- Phylum: Arthropoda
- Class: Insecta
- Order: Diptera
- Family: Asilidae
- Genus: Anisopogon; Roder, 1881

= Anisopogon (fly) =

Genus of flies

Anisopogon is a genus of robber flies in the family Asilidae. There are at least three described species in Anisopogon.

== Species ==
These three species that belong to the genus Anisopogon:

- Anisopogon glabellus (Roder, 1881)^{c g}
- Anisopogon gracillimus (Lehr, 1970)^{c g}
- Anisopogon parvus (Efflatoun, 1937)^{c g}

Data sources: i = ITIS, c = Catalogue of Life, g = GBIF, b = Bugguide.net
