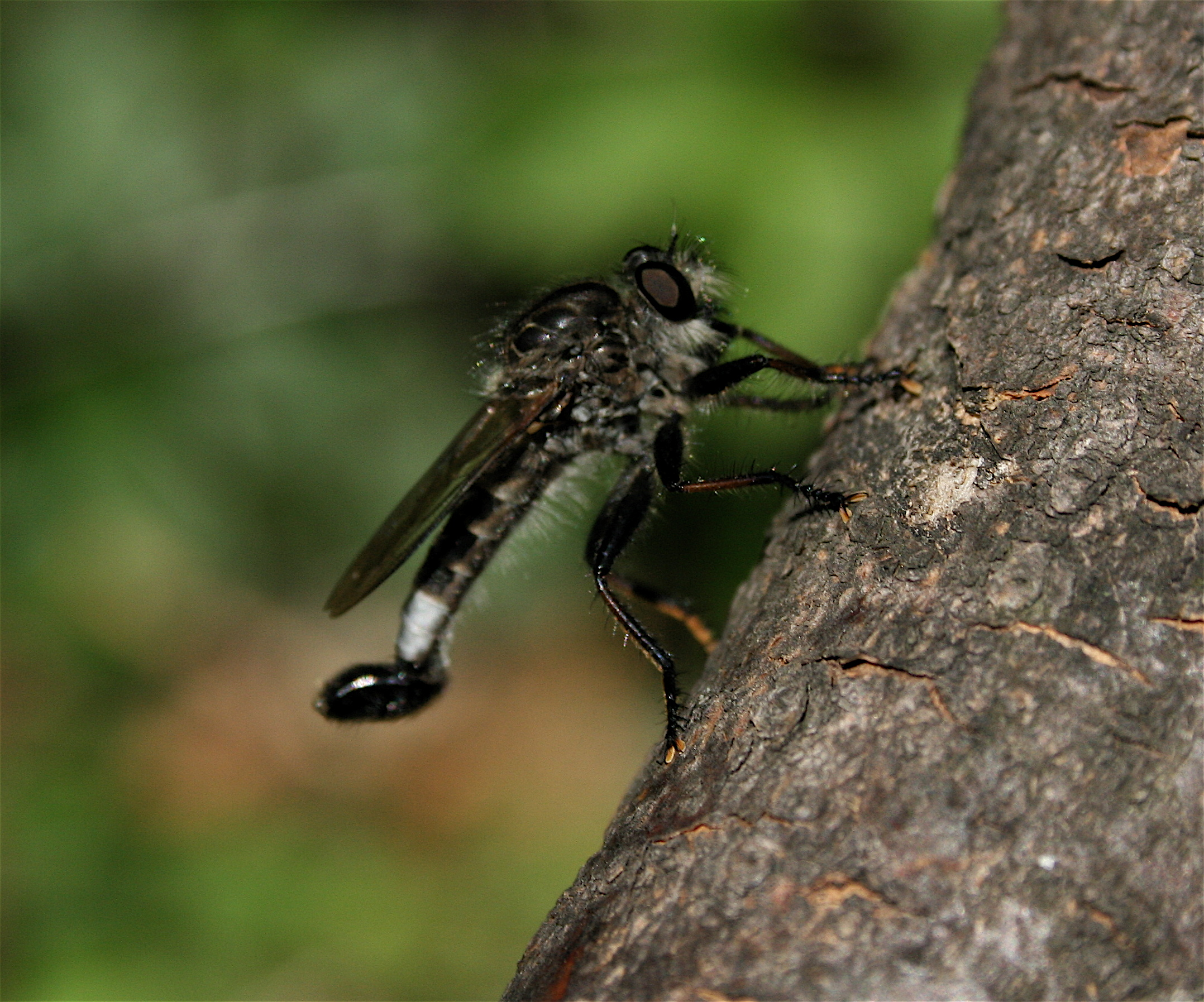
- Efferia aestuans

Scientific classification
- Domain: Eukaryota
- Kingdom: Animalia
- Phylum: Arthropoda
- Class: Insecta
- Order: Diptera
- Family: Asilidae
- Subfamily: Asilinae

Tribes
- Apocleini; Asilini; Ommatiini; Lycomyini; Machimini; Neomochtherini; Philonicini

= Asilinae =

Subfamily of flies

Asilinae is a large subfamily of flies in the family Asilidae, the robber flies and assassin flies. It includes over 180 genera.

== See also ==
- List of Asilinae genera
