= List of Asilidae species: E =

This article lists described species of the family Asilidae start with letter E.

A • B • C • D • E • F • G • H • I • J • K • L • M • N • O • P • Q • R • S • T • U • V • W • Y • Z

== List of species ==
=== Genus Echthistus ===
- Echthistus cognatus (Loew, 1849)

=== Genus Echthodopa ===
- Echthodopa carolinensis (Bromley, 1951)
- Echthodopa formosa (Loew, 1872)
- Echthodopa pubera (Loew, 1866)

=== Genus Efferia ===
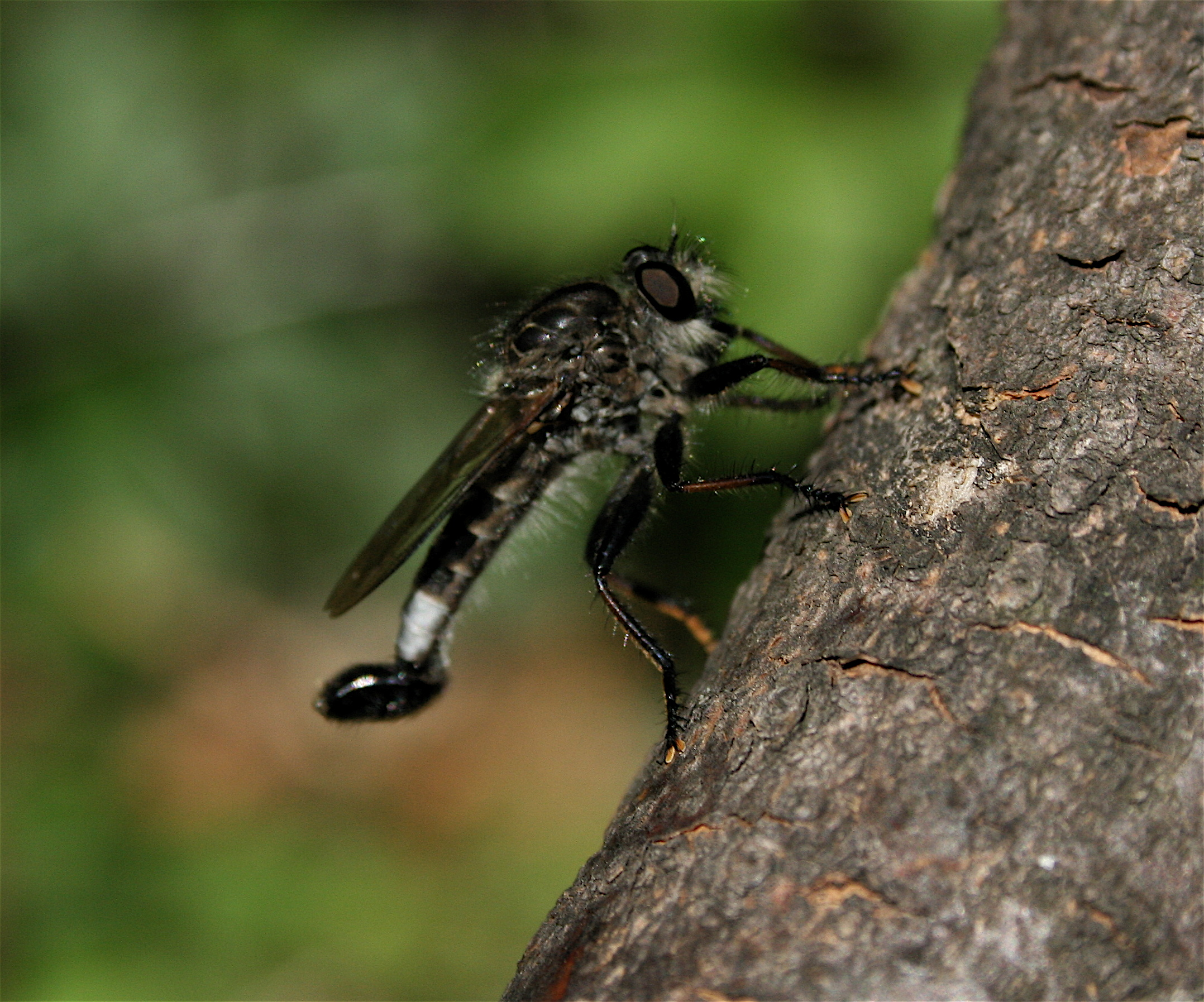
Efferia aestuans male

- Efferia abdominalis (Wiedemann, 1821)
- Efferia aestuans (Linnaeus, 1763)
- Efferia affinis (Bellardi, 1861)
- Efferia albibarbis (Macquart, 1838)
- Efferia albispinosa (Macquart, 1850)
- Efferia albiventris (Macquart, 1850) no corresponding record found in GBIF
- Efferia alia Scarbrough & Perez-Gelabert, 2009
- Efferia amarynceus (Walker, 1849)
- Efferia amazonica (Bromley, 1934)
- Efferia amphissa (Walker, 1849)
- Efferia anacapai (Wilcox & Martin, 1945)
- Efferia anomala (Bellardi, 1861)
- Efferia antiochi (Wilcox, 1966)
- Efferia anza (Forbes, 1988)
- Efferia apache (Wilcox, 1966)
- Efferia aper (Walker, 1855)
- Efferia apicalis (Wiedemann, 1821)
- Efferia argentifascia Enderlein, 1914
- Efferia argentifrons (Hine, 1911)
- Efferia argyrosoma (Hine, 1911)
- Efferia arida (Williston, 1893)
- Efferia armata (Hine, 1918)
- Efferia aurimystacea (Hine, 1919)
- Efferia auripila (Hine, 1916)
- Efferia aurivestitus (Hine, 1919)
- Efferia azteci (Wilcox, 1966)
- Efferia badiapex (Bromley, 1928)
- Efferia barbiellinii (Curran, 1935)
- Efferia bardyllus (Walker, 1849)
- Efferia basingeri (Wilcox, 1966)
- Efferia basini (Wilcox, 1966)
- Efferia bastardi (Macquart, 1838)
- Efferia beameri Wilcox, 1966
- Efferia belfragei (Hine, 1919)
- Efferia bellardii Scarbrough, 2008
- Efferia benedicti (Bromley, 1940)
- Efferia bexarensis (Bromley, 1934)
- Efferia bicaudata (Hine, 1919)
- Efferia bicolor (Bellardi, 1861)
- Efferia bilineatus (Wulp, 1882)
- Efferia bimaculata (Bellardi, 1861)
- Efferia bromleyi (Scarbrough, 2008)
- Efferia brunnescens (Bromley, 1929)
- Efferia bryanti (Wilcox, 1966)
- Efferia bullata Scarbrough & Perez-Gelabert, 2009
- Efferia cabeza (Wilcox, 1966)
- Efferia calienta (Wilcox, 1966)
- Efferia californica (Schaeffer, 1916)
- Efferia camposiana (Curran, 1931)
- Efferia cana (Hine, 1916)
- Efferia candida (Coquillett, 1893)
- Efferia canella (Bromley, 1934)
- Efferia carinata (Bellardi, 1861)
- Efferia caudex (Walker, 1849) synonym: Efferia invaria (Walker, 1851)
- Efferia caymanensis (Scarbrough, 1988)
- Efferia cazieri (Curran, 1953)
- Efferia cellatus (Schiner, 1868)
- Efferia cerdai Tomasovic, 2002
- Efferia chapadensis (Bromley, 1928)
- Efferia cingulata (Bellardi, 1861)
- Efferia clavata Scarbrough & Perez-Gelabert, 2009
- Efferia clementei (Wilcox & Martin, 1945)
- Efferia cockerellorum (James, 1953)
- Efferia commiles (Walker, 1851)
- Efferia completa (Macquart, 1838)
- Efferia concinnata (Williston, 1901)
- Efferia coquilletti (Hine, 1919)
- Efferia costalis (Williston, 1885)
- Efferia coulei (Wilcox, 1966)
- Efferia cressoni (Hine, 1919)
- Efferia cubensis (Bromley, 1929)
- Efferia cuervana (Hardy, 1943)
- Efferia currani (Bromley, 1951)
- Efferia davisi (Wilcox, 1966)
- Efferia demifasciata (Macquart, 1850)
- Efferia deserti (Wilcox, 1966)
- Efferia dilecta (Walker, 1855)
- Efferia dubia (Williston, 1885)
- Efferia duncani (Wilcox, 1966)
- Efferia ehrenbergi (Wilcox, 1966)
- Efferia eraxoides (Curran, 1935)
- Efferia eurylaris (Wiedemann, 1828)
- Efferia exacta Scarbrough & Perez-Gelabert, 2009
- Efferia eximia (Bellardi, 1861)
- Efferia femorata (Macquart, 1838)
- Efferia flavida (Wiedemann, 1828)
- Efferia flavofasciata (Wiedemann, 1828)
- Efferia forbesi (Curran, 1931)
- Efferia fortis (Walker, 1855) synonym: Efferia rufitibia (Macquart, 1848)
- Efferia frewingi (Wilcox, 1966)
- Efferia fulvibarbis (Macquart, 1848)
- Efferia fusca (Wiedemann, 1828)
- Efferia fuscanipennis (Macquart, 1850)
- Efferia fuscipennis (Macquart, 1847)
- Efferia garciai Lamas, 1971
- Efferia gila (Wilcox, 1966)
- Efferia gossei (Farr, 1965)
- Efferia grandis (Hine, 1919)
- Efferia halli (Wilcox, 1966)
- Efferia haloesa (Walker, 1849)
- Efferia halterata Enderlein, 1914
- Efferia harveyi (Hine, 1919)
- Efferia helenae (Bromley, 1951)
- Efferia heteropterus (Macquart, 1846)
- Efferia hinei Scarbrough, 2008
- Efferia hubbelli (James, 1953)
- Efferia hyalipennis (Macquart, 1838)
- Efferia imbuda (Curran, 1934)
- Efferia imperialis (Forbes, 1988)
- Efferia incisura Scarbrough & Perez-Gelabert, 2009
- Efferia incognita (Forbes, 1987)
- Efferia inflata (Hine, 1911)
- Efferia insula Scarbrough, 2008
- Efferia intermedius Lamas, 1971
- Efferia jubata (Williston, 1885)
- Efferia kansensis (Hine, 1919)
- Efferia kelloggi (Wilcox, 1966)
- Efferia knowltoni (Bromley, 1937)
- Efferia kondratieffi (Bullington & Lavigne, 1984)
- Efferia labidophora (Wiedemann, 1828)
- Efferia lades (Walker, 1849)
- Efferia lasciva (Wiedemann, 1828)
- Efferia latiforceps (Bromley, 1928)
- Efferia latruncula (Williston, 1885)
- Efferia lesbius Lamas, 1971
- Efferia leucocoma (Williston, 1885)
- Efferia loewi (Bellardi, 1862)
- Efferia luna (Wilcox, 1966)
- Efferia macrolabis (Wiedemann, 1828)
- Efferia macroxipha (Forbes, 1988)
- Efferia macularis (Wiedemann, 1821)
- Efferia marginata (Bellardi, 1861)
- Efferia mediana (Wiedemann, 1828)
- Efferia mellina (Wiedemann, 1828)
- Efferia mesquite (Bromley, 1951)
- Efferia mexicana (Hine, 1919)
- Efferia minor (Macquart, 1847)
- Efferia monki (Bromley, 1951)
- Efferia montensis Scarbrough & Perez-Gelabert, 2009
- Efferia mortensoni (Wilcox, 1966)
- Efferia murina (Philippi, 1865)
- Efferia mygidon (Walker, 1851)
- Efferia nemoralis (Hine, 1911)
- Efferia neoinflata (Wilcox, 1966)
- Efferia neosimilis (Forbes, 1987)
- Efferia nigerina (Wiedemann, 1821)
- Efferia nigripes (Macquart, 1850)
- Efferia nigritarsis (Hine, 1919)
- Efferia obscura (Macquart, 1838)
- Efferia ordwayae (Wilcox, 1966)
- Efferia pachychaeta (Bromley, 1928)
- Efferia pallidula (Hine, 1911)
- Efferia parkeri (Wilcox, 1966)
- Efferia parva (Walker, 1855)
- Efferia parvula (Bellardi, 1861)
- Efferia patagoniensis (Macquart, 1850)
- Efferia pavida (Williston, 1901)
- Efferia peralta (Wilcox, 1966)
- Efferia pernicis (Coquillett, 1893)
- Efferia picea Scarbrough & Perez-Gelabert, 2009
- Efferia pictipennis (Schiner, 1868)
- Efferia pilosa (Hine, 1919)
- Efferia pilosula (Bromley, 1929)
- Efferia pina (Scarbrough, 2008)
- Efferia pinali (Wilcox, 1966)
- Efferia plena (Hine, 1916)
- Efferia poecilolampra (James, 1953)
- Efferia pogonias (Wiedemann, 1821)
- Efferia portoricensis (Hine, 1919)
- Efferia prairiensis (Bromley, 1934)
- Efferia prattii (Hine, 1919)
- Efferia producta (Hine, 1919)
- Efferia prolifica (Osten Sacken, 1887)
- Efferia propinqua (Bromley, 1928)
- Efferia pulchripes (Bromley, 1928)
- Efferia pumila (Macquart, 1850)
- Efferia pyrrhogona (Wiedemann, 1828)
- Efferia quadrimaculata (Bellardi, 1861)
- Efferia rapax (Osten Sacken, 1887)
- Efferia remus Tomasovic, 2002
- Efferia rubidiventris (Macquart, 1850)
- Efferia rufina (Wiedemann, 1819)
- Efferia rufipes (Macquart, 1838)
- Efferia rufithorax (Macquart, 1846)
- Efferia sagax (Williston, 1901)
- Efferia satyrus Lamas, 1971
- Efferia schadei (Bromley, 1951)
- Efferia senilis (Wiedemann, 1828)
- Efferia serrula Scarbrough & Perez-Gelabert, 2009
- Efferia setigera (Wilcox, 1966)
- Efferia sicyon (Walker, 1849)
- Efferia similis (Williston, 1885)
- Efferia singularis (Macquart, 1838)
- Efferia sinuosa Scarbrough & Perez-Gelabert, 2009
- Efferia slossonae (Hine, 1919)
- Efferia snowi (Hine, 1919)
- Efferia sonorensis Forbes, 1987
- Efferia speciosa (Philippi, 1865) considered synonym of Eccritosia rubriventris (Philippi, 1865) in GBIF
- Efferia spiniventris (Hine, 1919)
- Efferia spinula Scarbrough & Perez-Gelabert, 2009
- Efferia splendens (Williston, 1901)
- Efferia staminea (Williston, 1885)
- Efferia stigmosa (Carrera & Andretta, 1950)
- Efferia stimicon (Walker, 1851)
- Efferia stylata (Fabricius, 1775) synonym: Efferia haitensis (Macquart, 1848)
- Efferia subappendiculata (Macquart, 1838)
- Efferia subarida (Bromley, 1940)
- Efferia subchalybea (Bromley, 1928)
- Efferia subcuprea (Schaeffer, 1916)
- Efferia subpilosa (Schaeffer, 1916)
- Efferia suspiciosa Scarbrough & Perez-Gelabert, 2009
- Efferia tabescens (Banks, 1919)
- Efferia tagax (Williston, 1885)
- Efferia texana (Banks, 1919)
- Efferia titan (Bromley, 1934)
- Efferia tolandi (Wilcox, 1966)
- Efferia tortola (Curran, 1928)
- Efferia tricella (Bromley, 1951)
- Efferia triton (Osten Sacken, 1887)
- Efferia truncata (Hine, 1911)
- Efferia tuberculata (Coquillett, 1904)
- Efferia tucsoni (Wilcox, 1966)
- Efferia utahensis (Bromley, 1937)
- Efferia varipes (Williston, 1885)
- Efferia vauriei (Curran, 1953)
- Efferia velox (Wiedemann, 1828)
- Efferia vertebrata (Bromley, 1940)
- Efferia vinalensis (Scarbrough, 2008)
- Efferia wilcoxi (Bromley, 1940)
- Efferia willistoni (Hine, 1919) considered homotypic synonym of Neomochtherus willistoni (Hine, 1909) in GBIF
- Efferia woodleyi Scarbrough & Perez-Gelabert, 2009
- Efferia yermo (Wilcox, 1966)
- Efferia yuma (Wilcox, 1966)
- Efferia zetterstedti (Jaennicke, 1865)
- Efferia zonata (Hine, 1919)

=== Genus Eicherax ===
- Eicherax flavescens (James, 1953)
- Eicherax ricnotes (Engel, 1930)
- Eicherax simplex (Macquart, 1848)

=== Genus Eichoichemus ===
- Eichoichemus connexus (Wiedemann, 1828)
- Eichoichemus flavianalis (Macquart, 1848)
- Eichoichemus gavius (Walker, 1851)
- Eichoichemus kalettai (Ayala, 1978)
- Eichoichemus lizbethae (Ayala, 1978)
- Eichoichemus lycorius (Walker, 1851)
- Eichoichemus melaleucus (Wiedemann, 1828)
- Eichoichemus pyrrhomystax (Wiedemann, 1828)

=== Genus Emphysomera ===
- Emphysomera auribarbis (Wiedemann, 1828)
- Emphysomera flavipes (Macquart, 1834)
- Emphysomera cassidea (Scarbrough & Marascia, 1999)
- Emphysomera clava (Scarbrough & Marascia, 1999)
- Emphysomera galba (Scarbrough & Marascia, 1999)
- Emphysomera rugula (Scarbrough & Marascia, 1999)
- Emphysomera spinalis (Scarbrough & Marascia, 1996)
- Emphysomera tectura (Scarbrough & Marascia, 1999)
- Emphysomera ula (Scarbrough & Marascia, 1999)

=== Genus Empodiodes ===
- Empodiodes greatheadi (Oldroyd, 1972)
- Empodiodes melanoscopaeus (Londt, 1992)
- Empodiodes whittingtoni (Londt, 1992)

=== Genus Engelepogon ===
- Engelepogon antiochienensis (Tsacas, 1964)
- Engelepogon chrysophora (Tsacas, 1964)
- Engelepogon collarti (Bequaert, 1964)
- Engelepogon idiorrhythmicus (Janssens, 1960)
- Engelepogon keiseri (Tsacas, 1967)
- Engelepogon nesiotis (Tsacas, 1964)
- Engelepogon pallida (Theodor, 1980)
- Engelepogon thasia (Tsacas, 1964)

=== Genus Enigmomorphus ===
- Enigmomorphus paradoxus (Hermann, 1912)

=== Genus Epaphroditus ===
- Epaphroditus conspicuus (Wulp, 1872)

=== Genus Epiklisis ===
- Epiklisis pilitarsis (Becker, 1925)

=== Genus Epipamponeurus ===
- Epipamponeurus americanus (Becker, 1919)

=== Genus Erax ===
- Erax atticus (Loew, 1871)
- Erax costalis (Wulp, 1899)
- Erax crassicauda (Loew, 1862)
- Erax dilsi (Tomasovic, 2002)
- Erax ermolenkoi (Lehr, 1992)
- Erax fuscidus (Pallas, 1818)
- Erax gracilis (Theodor, 1980)
- Erax grootaerti (Tomasovic, 2002)
- Erax hayati (Tomasovic, 2002)
- Erax macedonicus (Tsacas, 1960)
- Erax melanothrix (Tsacas, 1960)
- Erax nigrocinctus (Becker, 1909)
- Erax nigrosetosus (Theodor, 1980)
- Erax nubeculus (Loew, 1848)
- Erax punctipennis (Meigen, 1820)
- Erax rjabovi (Richter, 1963)
- Erax sedulus (Richter, 1963)
- Erax tenuicornis (Loew, 1848)

=== Genus Eraxasilus ===
- Eraxasilus acuminatus (Carrera, 1959)
- Eraxasilus gerion (Walker, 1849)
- Eraxasilus hebes (Walker, 1855)
- Eraxasilus longiusculus (Walker, 1855)
- Eraxasilus peticus (Walker, 1849)
- Eraxasilus potamon (Walker, 1851)
- Eraxasilus pruinosus (Carrera, 1959)

=== Genus Erebunus ===
- Erebunus badghysicus (Lehr, 1987)
- Erebunus mirabilis (Richter, 1966)

=== Genus Eremisca ===
- Eremisca autumnalis (Zinovjeva, 1956)
- Eremisca gobia (Lehr, 1972)
- Eremisca interposita (Lehr, 1987)
- Eremisca laticerca (Lehr, 1987)
- Eremisca major (Lehr, 1964)
- Eremisca multis (Lehr, 1987)
- Eremisca obscura (Lehr, 1987)
- Eremisca orientalis (Lehr, 1972)
- Eremisca poecilus (Becker, 1923)
- Eremisca stackelbergi (Lehr, 1964)
- Eremisca subarenosa (Lehr, 1987)
- Eremisca trivialis (Lehr, 1987)
- Eremisca vernalis (Zinovjeva, 1956)

=== Genus Eremodromus ===
- Eremodromus flaviventris (Efflatoun, 1937)
- Eremodromus gracilis (Paramonov, 1930)
- Eremodromus noctivagus (Zimin, 1928)
- Eremodromus zimini (Lehr, 1979)

=== Genus Eremonotus ===
- Eremonotus nudus (Theodor, 1980)

=== Genus Eriopogon ===
- Eriopogon jubatus (Becker, 1906)
- Eriopogon spatenkai (Hradský & Hüttinger, 1995)

=== Genus Erythropogon ===
- Erythropogon ichneumoniformis (White, 1914)

=== Genus Esatanas ===
- Esatanas chan (Engel, 1934)
- Esatanas kozlovi (Lehr, 1986)
- Esatanas shah (Rondani, 1873)
- Esatanas velox (Lehr, 1963)
- Esatanas villosus (Lehr, 1986)

=== Genus Eucyrtopogon ===
- Eucyrtopogon albibarbus (Curran, 1923)
- Eucyrtopogon calcaratus (Curran, 1923)
- Eucyrtopogon comantis (Curran, 1923)
- Eucyrtopogon diversipilosis (Curran, 1923)
- Eucyrtopogon incompletus (Adisoemarto, 1967)
- Eucyrtopogon kelloggi (Wilcox, 1936)
- Eucyrtopogon maculosus (Coquillett, 1904)
- Eucyrtopogon nebulo (Osten-Sacken, 1877)
- Eucyrtopogon nigripes (Jones, 1907)
- Eucyrtopogon punctipennis (Melander, 1923)
- Eucyrtopogon varipennis (Coquillett, 1904)

=== Genus Eudioctria ===
- Eudioctria beameri (Wilcox & Martin, 1941)
- Eudioctria brevis (Banks, 1917)
- Eudioctria disjuncta (Adisoemarto & Wood, 1975)
- Eudioctria dissimilis (Adisoemarto & Wood, 1975)
- Eudioctria doanei (Melander, 1924)
- Eudioctria media (Banks, 1917)
- Eudioctria monrovia (Wilcox & Martin, 1941)
- Eudioctria nitida (Williston, 1883)
- Eudioctria propinqua (Bromley, 1924)
- Eudioctria unica (Adisoemarto & Wood, 1975)

=== Genus Eumecosoma ===
- Eumecosoma ayala (Kaletta, 1974)
- Eumecosoma caerulum (Scarbrough & Perez-Gelabert, 2006)
- Eumecosoma calverti (Hine, 1917)
- Eumecosoma carmina (Kaletta, 1974)
- Eumecosoma dicromum (Bigot, 1878)
- Eumecosoma hirsutum (Hermann, 1912)
- Eumecosoma metallescens (Schiner, 1868)
- Eumecosoma pleuritica (Wiedemann, 1828)
- Eumecosoma shropshirei (Curran, 1930)
- Eumecosoma staurophorum (Schiner, 1868)
- Eumecosoma tiarensis (Kaletta, 1978)

=== Genus Eurhabdus ===
- Eurhabdus jamaicensis (Farr, 1973)
- Eurhabdus longissimus (Tomasovic, 2002)
- Eurhabdus sororius (Scarbrough & Perez-Gelabert, )
- Eurhabdus zephyreus (Aldrich, 1923)

=== Genus Euscelidia ===
- Euscelidia abbreviata Dikow, 2003
- Euscelidia acuminata Dikow, 2003
- Euscelidia adusta Dikow, 2003
- Euscelidia anthrax (Janssens, 1957)
- Euscelidia atrata Dikow, 2003
- Euscelidia bechuana Dikow, 2003
- Euscelidia bequaerti (Janssens, 1957)
- Euscelidia bicolor (Janssens, 1954)
- Euscelidia bishariensis (Efflatoun, 1937)
- Euscelidia cacula Dikow, 2003
- Euscelidia cana Dikow, 2003
- Euscelidia capensis Dikow, 2003
- Euscelidia castanea (Janssens, 1954)
- Euscelidia cobice Dikow, 2003
- Euscelidia crena Dikow, 2003
- Euscelidia discors (Speiser, 1913)
- Euscelidia dorata (Oldroyd, 1970)
- Euscelidia erichthenii Dikow, 2003
- Euscelidia fastigium (Martin, 1964)
- Euscelidia festiva (Janssens, 1954)
- Euscelidia fistula Dikow, 2003
- Euscelidia flava Dikow, 2003
- Euscelidia glabra Dikow, 2003
- Euscelidia gutianensis (Shi, 1995)
- Euscelidia hesperia Dikow, 2003
- Euscelidia hyalina Dikow, 2003
- Euscelidia insolita Dikow, 2003
- Euscelidia kasungu Dikow, 2003
- Euscelidia lata Dikow, 2003
- Euscelidia lepida Dikow, 2003
- Euscelidia livida Dikow, 2003
- Euscelidia longibifida Dikow, 2003
- Euscelidia lucida (Oldroyd, 1939)
- Euscelidia lucioides Dikow, 2003
- Euscelidia milva Dikow, 2003
- Euscelidia moyoensis (Oldroyd, 1970)
- Euscelidia mucronata Dikow, 2003
- Euscelidia natalensis Dikow, 2003
- Euscelidia notialis Dikow, 2003
- Euscelidia obtusa Dikow, 2003
- Euscelidia obudu Dikow, 2003
- Euscelidia peteraxi Dikow, 2003
- Euscelidia picta Dikow, 2003
- Euscelidia pipinna Dikow, 2003
- Euscelidia popa Dikow, 2003
- Euscelidia prolata Dikow, 2003
- Euscelidia pulchra Dikow, 2003
- Euscelidia rapacoides (Oldroyd, 1972)
- Euscelidia rapax (Westwood, 1850)
- Euscelidia schoutedeni (Janssens, 1954)
- Euscelidia senegalensis Dikow, 2003
- Euscelidia splendida Dikow, 2003
- Euscelidia trifoliata (Janssens, 1953)
- Euscelidia tsavo Dikow, 2003
- Euscelidia vallis Dikow, 2003
- Euscelidia venusta Dikow, 2003
- Euscelidia zumpti (Janssens, 1957)

=== Genus Euthrixius ===
- Euthrixius distinguendus (Lynch & Arribálzaga, 1881)

=== Genus Eutolmus ===
- Eutolmus annulatus (Becker, 1923)
- Eutolmus apiculatus (Loew, 1848)
- Eutolmus bureschi (Hradský & Moucha, 1964)
- Eutolmus calopus (Loew, 1848)
- Eutolmus fascialis (Loew, 1848)
- Eutolmus graecus (Loew, 1871)
- Eutolmus koreanus (Hradský & Hüttinger, 1985)
- Eutolmus lavcievi (Jelesova, 1974)
- Eutolmus leucacanthus (Loew, 1871)
- Eutolmus lusitanicus (Loew, 1854)
- Eutolmus maximus (Hradský & Geller-Grimm, 1998)
- Eutolmus mediocris (Becker, 1923)
- Eutolmus montanus (Lehr, 1984)
- Eutolmus niger (Hradský & Hüttinger, 1985)
- Eutolmus ohirai (Hradský & Hüttinger, 1985)
- Eutolmus palestinensis (Theodor, 1980)
- Eutolmus parricida (Loew, 1848)
- Eutolmus pecinensis (Lehr, 1984)
- Eutolmus polypogon (Loew, 1848)
- Eutolmus sedakoffii (Loew, 1854)
- Eutolmus stratiotes (Gerstaecker, 1862)
- Eutolmus taiwanensis (Hradský & Hüttinger, 1985)
- Eutolmus tolmeroides (Bromley, 1928)
- Eutolmus wahisi (Tomasovic, 2001)
- Eutolmus znoikoi (Richter, 1963)
