= List of Neomochtherus species =

This is a list of 141 species in Neomochtherus, a genus of robber flies in the family Asilidae.

== Neomochtherus species ==
- Neomochtherus acratus Tsacas, 1968^{c g}
- Neomochtherus aegaeus Tsacas, 1965^{c g}
- Neomochtherus aegyptius (Macquart, 1838)^{c g}
- Neomochtherus aerifacies Tsacas, 1968^{c g}
- Neomochtherus africanus (Ricardo, 1919)^{c}
- Neomochtherus alaicus Lehr, 1996^{c g}
- Neomochtherus albicans (Loew, 1849)^{c g}
- Neomochtherus albicomus (Hine, 1909)^{i c g}
- Neomochtherus analis (Macquart, 1838)^{c g}
- Neomochtherus angustipennis (Hine, 1909)^{i c g}
- Neomochtherus annulitarsis (Loew, 1858)^{c g}
- Neomochtherus aquitanus Tsacas, 1964^{c g}
- Neomochtherus arabicus (Macquart, 1838)^{c g}
- Neomochtherus atripes Oldroyd, 1958^{c g}
- Neomochtherus atrox Tsacas, 1969^{c g}
- Neomochtherus auratus Janssens, 1968^{c g}
- Neomochtherus auricomus (Hine, 1909)^{i c g b}
- Neomochtherus blandus Tsacas, 1969^{c g}
- Neomochtherus brevipennis Seguy, 1932^{c g}
- Neomochtherus californicus (Hine, 1909)^{i c g b}
- Neomochtherus callipygus Tsacas, 1969^{c g}
- Neomochtherus candidus (Becker, 1923)^{c g}
- Neomochtherus carthaginis (Becker, 1915)^{c g}
- Neomochtherus catharius Tsacas, 1968^{c g}
- Neomochtherus caucasicus Tsacas, 1968^{c g}
- Neomochtherus clypeatus (Becker, 1915)^{c g}
- Neomochtherus comosus (Hine, 1918)^{i c g b}
- Neomochtherus confusus Tsacas, 1965^{c g}
- Neomochtherus congedus (Walker, 1851)^{c g}
- Neomochtherus corcyraeus Tsacas, 1965^{c g}
- Neomochtherus cypreus Tsacas, 1968^{c g}
- Neomochtherus cythereius Tsacas, 1965^{c g}
- Neomochtherus debilis Tsacas, 1969^{c g}
- Neomochtherus deserticolus (Karsch, 1888)^{c g}
- Neomochtherus desertorum Lehr, 1958^{c g}
- Neomochtherus detorsus Tsacas, 1968^{c g}
- Neomochtherus dichromopygus Tsacas, 1965^{c g}
- Neomochtherus disjunctus Tsacas, 1968^{c g}
- Neomochtherus distans Tsacas, 1968^{c g}
- Neomochtherus eulabes (Loew, 1871)^{c g}
- Neomochtherus europaeus Tsacas, 1968^{c g}
- Neomochtherus exilis Tsacas, 1969^{c g}
- Neomochtherus farinosus (Loew, 1871)^{c g}
- Neomochtherus firmus Tsacas, 1968^{c g}
- Neomochtherus flavicornis (Ruthe, 1831)^{c g}
- Neomochtherus flavipes (Meigen, 1820)^{c g}
- Neomochtherus fulvipes (Meigen, 1820)^{c g}
- Neomochtherus fuscifemoratus (Macquart, 1838)^{c g}
- Neomochtherus fuscipennis Tsacas, 1968^{c g}
- Neomochtherus futilis Tsacas, 1969^{c g}
- Neomochtherus genialis Tsacas, 1969^{c g}
- Neomochtherus geniculatus (Meigen, 1820)^{g}
- Neomochtherus genitalis Parui, Kaur & Kapoor, 1999^{c g}
- Neomochtherus gnavus (Wulp, 1872)^{c g}
- Neomochtherus gomerae Weinberg & Baez, 1989^{c g}
- Neomochtherus grandicollis (Becker, 1913)^{c g}
- Neomochtherus granitis Tsacas, 1963^{c g}
- Neomochtherus grisescens Tsacas, 1968^{c g}
- Neomochtherus hauseri Engel, 1927^{c g}
- Neomochtherus helictus Tsacas, 1968^{c g}
- Neomochtherus hermonensis Theodor, 1980^{c g}
- Neomochtherus himalayensis Joseph & Parui, 1987^{c g}
- Neomochtherus hungaricus Engel, 1927^{c g}
- Neomochtherus hybopygus Tsacas, 1968^{c g}
- Neomochtherus hypopygialis (Schaeffer, 1916)^{i c g}
- Neomochtherus idahoae (Martin, 1975)^{i c g}
- Neomochtherus illustris (Schiner, 1867)^{c}
- Neomochtherus indianus (Ricardo, 1919)^{c}
- Neomochtherus instabilis Tsacas, 1969^{c g}
- Neomochtherus jucundus Lehr, 1964^{c g}
- Neomochtherus kaszabi Lehr, 1975^{c g}
- Neomochtherus kivuensis Tsacas, 1969^{c g}
- Neomochtherus kozlovi Lehr, 1972^{c g}
- Neomochtherus lanzarotae Weinberg & Baez, 1989^{c g}
- Neomochtherus lassenae Martin, 1975^{i c g}
- Neomochtherus latipennis (Hine, 1909)^{i c g b}
- Neomochtherus leclercqi Janssens, 1968^{c g}
- Neomochtherus leclerqi Janssens, 1968^{g}
- Neomochtherus lepidus (Hine, 1909)^{i c g}
- Neomochtherus leucophorus Tsacas, 1963^{c g}
- Neomochtherus libanonensis Tsacas, 1968^{c g}
- Neomochtherus macropygus Tsacas, 1968^{c g}
- Neomochtherus maikovskii Lehr, 1958^{c g}
- Neomochtherus maroccanus Tsacas, 1968^{c g}
- Neomochtherus mendax Tsacas, 1969^{c g}
- Neomochtherus mesopotamicus Janssens, 1961^{c g}
- Neomochtherus micrasiaticus Tsacas, 1968^{c g}
- Neomochtherus monobius (Speiser, 1910)^{c g}
- Neomochtherus montanus (Hine, 1909)^{i c g}
- Neomochtherus mundus (Loew, 1849)^{c g}
- Neomochtherus nairicus Richter, 1962^{c g}
- Neomochtherus natalensis (Ricardo, 1919)^{c g}
- Neomochtherus notatus Tsacas, 1969^{c g}
- Neomochtherus nudus (Bezzi, 1906)^{c}
- Neomochtherus oblitus Tsacas, 1968^{c g}
- Neomochtherus ochrapes Hull, 1967^{c g}
- Neomochtherus ochriventris (Loew, 1854)^{c g}
- Neomochtherus olivierii (Macquart, 1838)^{c g}
- Neomochtherus orientalis Tsacas, 1968^{c g}
- Neomochtherus pallipes (MEIGEN, 1820)^{c g b} (devon red-legged robber fly)
- Neomochtherus pamphylius Tsacas, 1968^{c g}
- Neomochtherus patruelis (Wulp, 1872)^{c g}
- Neomochtherus peloponnesius Tsacas, 1968^{c g}
- Neomochtherus perplexus (Becker, 1923)^{c g}
- Neomochtherus petrishtshevae Stackelberg, 1937^{c g}
- Neomochtherus piceus (Hine, 1909)^{i c g}
- Neomochtherus platypygus Tsacas, 1968^{c g}
- Neomochtherus promiscus Tsacas, 1968^{c g}
- Neomochtherus psathyrus Tsacas, 1968^{c g}
- Neomochtherus pubescens Lehr, 1996^{c g}
- Neomochtherus pygaeus Tsacas, 1963^{c g}
- Neomochtherus quettanus Tsacas, 1968^{c g}
- Neomochtherus rhogmopygus Tsacas, 1965^{c g}
- Neomochtherus rossicus Engel, 1927^{c g}
- Neomochtherus rothkirchii (Speiser, 1913)^{c g}
- Neomochtherus rubipygus Lehr, 1972^{c g}
- Neomochtherus rutilans (Wulp, 1898)^{c g}
- Neomochtherus sahariensis Tsacas, 1968^{c g}
- Neomochtherus sanguensis Oldroyd, 1964^{c g}
- Neomochtherus sardus Tsacas, 1965^{c g}
- Neomochtherus schineri (Egger, 1855)^{c g}
- Neomochtherus schistaceus (Becker, 1908)^{c g}
- Neomochtherus sercove Lehr, 1964^{c g}
- Neomochtherus siculus (Macquart, 1834)^{c g}
- Neomochtherus signatipes Lindner, 1955^{c g}
- Neomochtherus sinensis Ricardo, 1919^{c g}
- Neomochtherus sinuatus (Loew, 1858)^{c g}
- Neomochtherus soleus Tsacas, 1968^{c g}
- Neomochtherus sphaeristes Tsacas, 1963^{c g}
- Neomochtherus stackelbergi Lehr, 1958^{c g}
- Neomochtherus striatipes (Loew, 1849)^{c g}
- Neomochtherus striatus (Wulp, 1891)^{c g}
- Neomochtherus tenius Tsacas, 1968^{c g}
- Neomochtherus thrax Tsacas, 1968^{c g}
- Neomochtherus tricuspidatus Engel, 1927^{c g}
- Neomochtherus trisignatus (Ricardo, 1922)^{c g}
- Neomochtherus unctus Oldroyd, 1939^{c g}
- Neomochtherus uratorum Richter, 1960^{c g}
- Neomochtherus willistoni (Hine, 1909)^{i c g b}
- Neomochtherus yasya Lehr, 1996^{c g}

Data sources: i = ITIS, c = Catalogue of Life, g = GBIF, b = Bugguide.net
