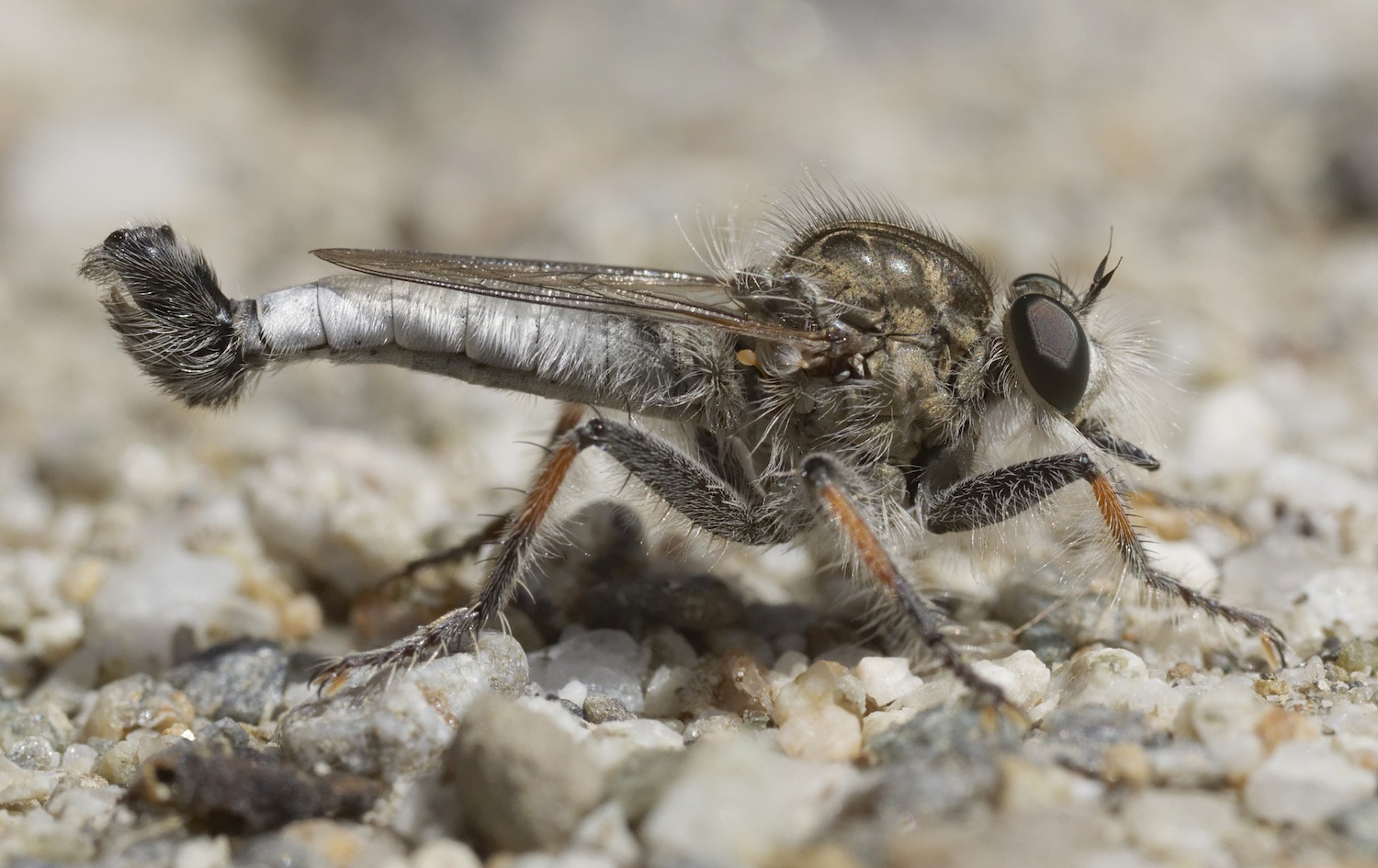
- Efferia deserti male in side view

Scientific classification
- Kingdom: Animalia
- Phylum: Arthropoda
- Class: Insecta
- Order: Diptera
- Family: Asilidae
- Subfamily: Asilinae
- Genus: Efferia; Coquillet, 1893

Type species
- Efferia candida Coquillet, 1893

Species
- over 240, see text

Synonyms
- Nerax Hull, 1962, TS: Asilus aestuans Linnaeus (orig. des.); Erax of authors, not Scopoli.

= Efferia =

Genus of flies

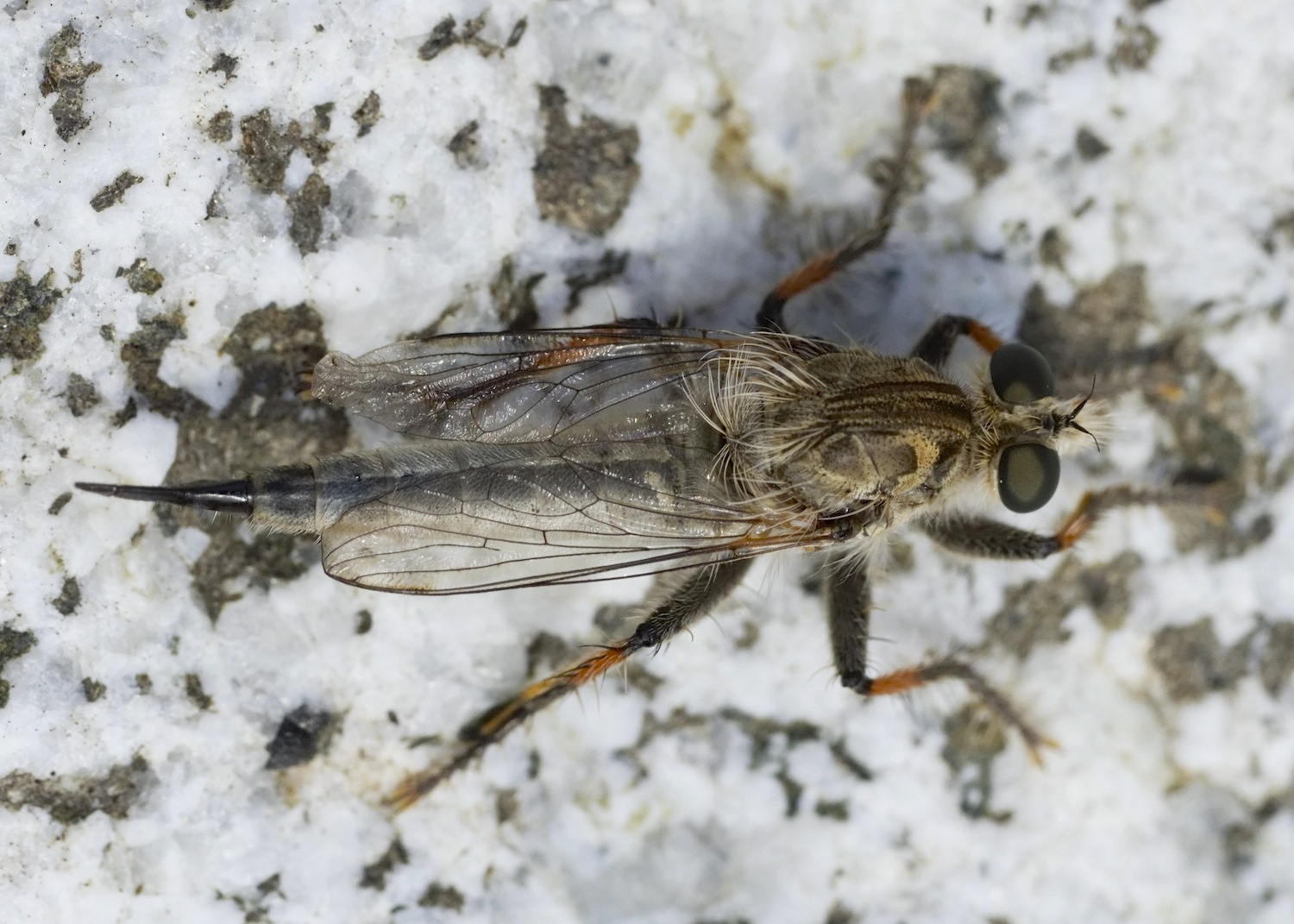
A view from above of a female Efferia deserti - note the converging veins R4 and R5 at the wing tip and the narrow cell r4 between both veins; quite a few Efferia species (like this one) have a short vein stub branching off near the split of R4 from R5

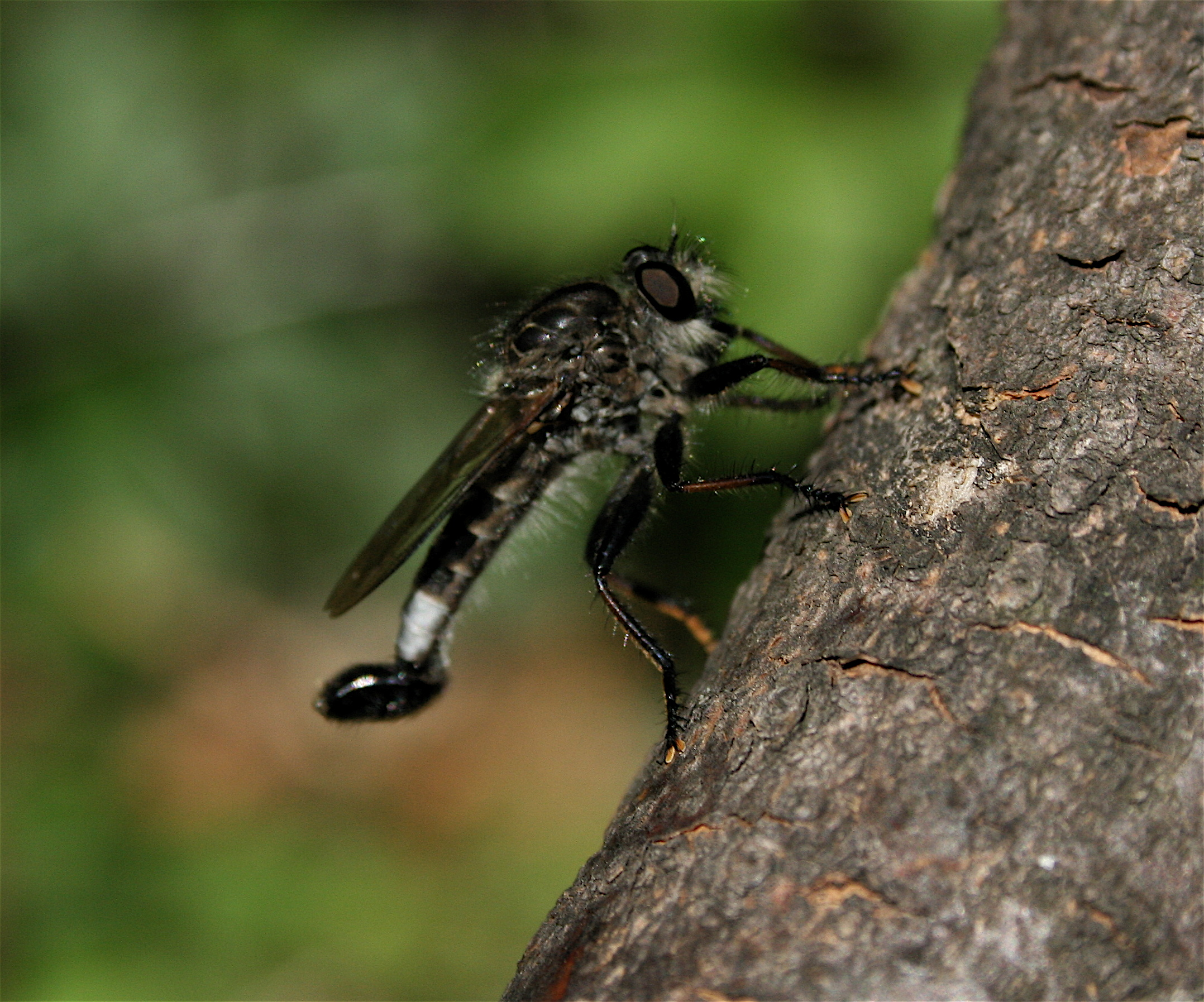
Male of Efferia aestuans

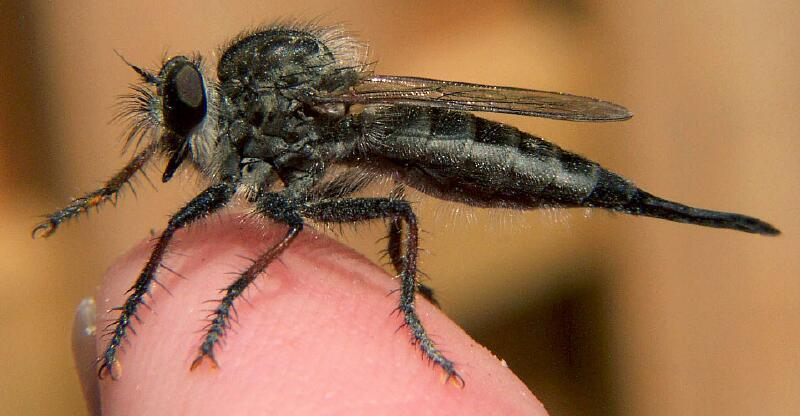
Female of Efferia aestuans

Efferia is an insect genus of mainly neotropical and nearctic Diptera in the family Asilidae or robber flies. It is one of the most species-rich genera of Asilidae, with particularly high diversity in arid or semi-arid ecosystems of the New World.

== Description ==
Small to large-sized robber flies (10–40 mm) with distinctly different shape of the posterior end of the abdomen in males versus females. Females have a short or long ovipositor that is hairless and short conical to slender wedge-shaped, its color is usually glossy black. Males have a "helicopter tail" with glossy black claspers that are covered in hairs, forming part of a complex genital structure (the combined epandrium and hypandrium) that is clearly larger than the abdominal segments and is oriented diagonally to vertically upwards relative to the main body axis.

Abdominal coloration is usually greyish to brownish in females, versus more contrasting with silvery and/or black segments or patches in males. In both sexes the tip of the genitalia usually extends past the wing tips. Wings are clear or uniformly tinted, with tints varying from transparent brown to dark black. Venation includes a recurrent vein on R1, narrow cell r4, R4 extending roughly parallel to R5 or converging moderately with R5 towards the wing tip.

== Biology ==
As is typical for robber flies, adult Efferia are ambush predators, taking off from a resting position on the ground or on a branch to intercept other flying insects in mid-air. Prey are taken from a wide variety of insect orders: Robert Lavigne's Predator-Prey Database for the family Asilidae has 918 records for Efferia species feeding frequently on Diptera, Homoptera, Hymenoptera, Heteroptera, Coleoptera, Lepidoptera, Orthoptera, as well as a few reports of prey species belonging to Neuroptera, Odonata, Ephemeroptera - and even one record for Araneae (spiders). Other asilids are frequently preyed upon, and cannibalism is common as well.

Efferia species of deserts and grasslands can occur in high abundance, at times even exceeding one individual per square foot. They tend to perch close to the ground and often remain quite immobile - sometimes until they are about to get stepped on. Spotting them is often a matter of first hearing the typically short evasive flight, before seeing where one landed. This is especially true for the males, which emit a characteristic pulsing buzz during the few seconds in flight; this sound tends to be loud and noticeably higher pitched than that of a flying female.

== Taxonomy ==
This is an as yet provisional list of 241 recognized species, combined from 235 entries for accepted species of Efferia in GBIF plus 6 species only listed as valid in other recent sources

- Efferia abdominalis (Wiedemann, 1821)
- Efferia aestuans (Linnaeus, 1763)
- Efferia affinis (Bellardi, 1861)
- Efferia albibarbis (Macquart, 1838)
- Efferia albispinosa (Macquart, 1850)
- Efferia albiventris (Macquart, 1850) no corresponding record found in GBIF
- Efferia alia Scarbrough & Perez-Gelabert, 2009
- Efferia amarynceus (Walker, 1849)
- Efferia amazonica (Bromley, 1934)
- Efferia amphissa (Walker, 1849)
- Efferia anacapai (Wilcox & Martin, 1945)
- Efferia anomala (Bellardi, 1861)
- Efferia antiochi (Wilcox, 1966)
- Efferia anza (Forbes, 1988)
- Efferia apache (Wilcox, 1966)
- Efferia aper (Walker, 1855)
- Efferia apicalis (Wiedemann, 1821)
- Efferia argentifascia Enderlein, 1914
- Efferia argentifrons (Hine, 1911)
- Efferia argyrosoma (Hine, 1911)
- Efferia arida (Williston, 1893)
- Efferia armata (Hine, 1918)
- Efferia aurimystacea (Hine, 1919)
- Efferia auripila (Hine, 1916)
- Efferia aurivestitus (Hine, 1919)
- Efferia azteci (Wilcox, 1966)
- Efferia badiapex (Bromley, 1928)
- Efferia barbiellinii (Curran, 1935)
- Efferia bardyllus (Walker, 1849)
- Efferia basingeri (Wilcox, 1966)
- Efferia basini (Wilcox, 1966)
- Efferia bastardi (Macquart, 1838)
- Efferia beameri Wilcox, 1966
- Efferia belfragei (Hine, 1919)
- Efferia bellardii Scarbrough, 2008
- Efferia benedicti (Bromley, 1940)
- Efferia bexarensis (Bromley, 1934)
- Efferia bicaudata (Hine, 1919)
- Efferia bicolor (Bellardi, 1861)
- Efferia bilineatus (Wulp, 1882)
- Efferia bimaculata (Bellardi, 1861)
- Efferia bromleyi (Scarbrough, 2008)
- Efferia brunnescens (Bromley, 1929)
- Efferia bryanti (Wilcox, 1966)
- Efferia bullata Scarbrough & Perez-Gelabert, 2009

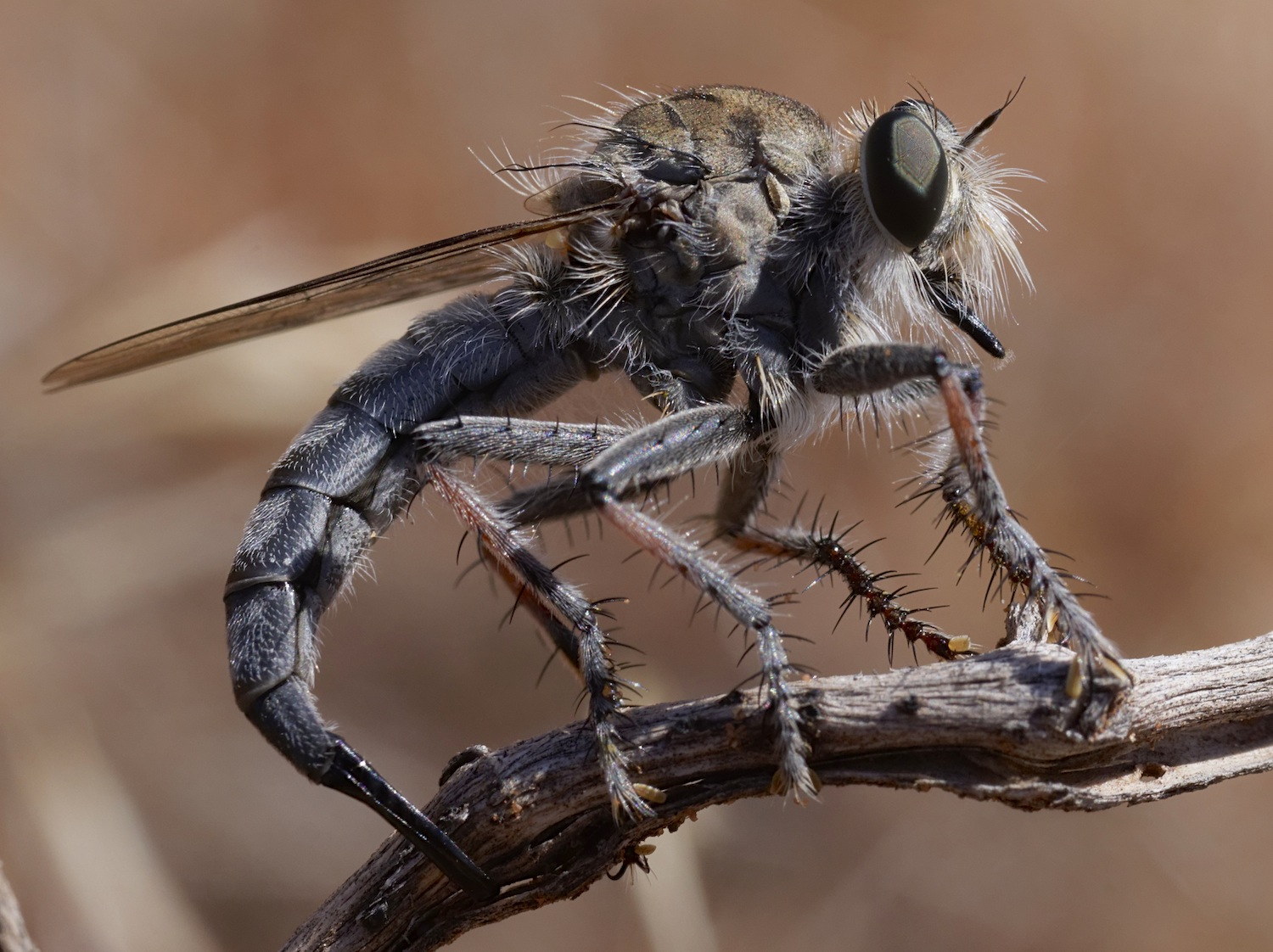
Female Efferia basini laying eggs under bark and in cracks of dead sagebrush

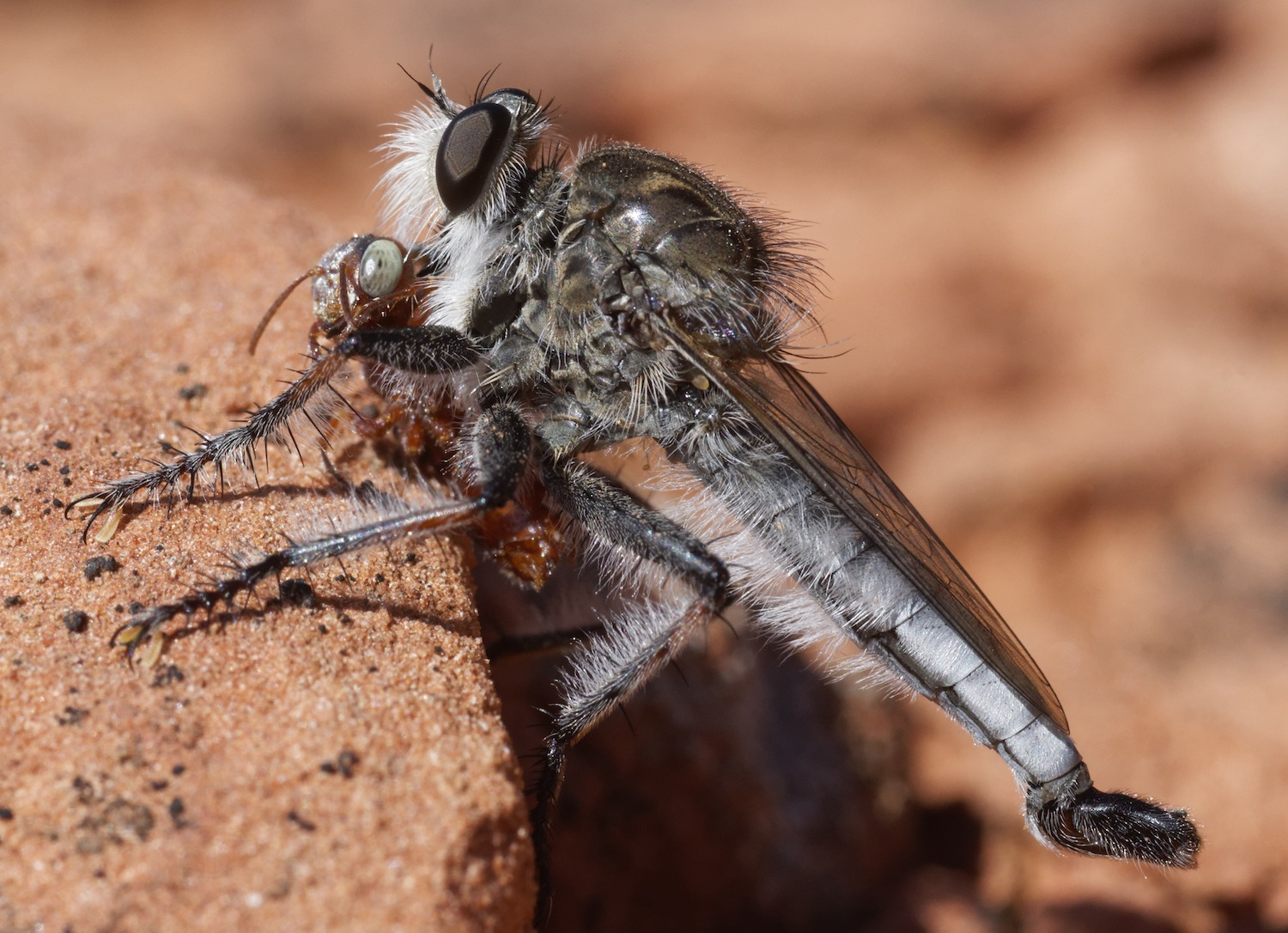
Male of Efferia basini feeding on a solitary bee

- Efferia cabeza (Wilcox, 1966)
- Efferia calienta (Wilcox, 1966)
- Efferia californica (Schaeffer, 1916)
- Efferia camposiana (Curran, 1931)
- Efferia cana (Hine, 1916)
- Efferia candida (Coquillett, 1893)
- Efferia canella (Bromley, 1934)
- Efferia carbonaria Scarbrough, 2012
- Efferia carinata (Bellardi, 1861)
- Efferia caudex (Walker, 1849) synonym: Efferia invaria (Walker, 1851)
- Efferia caymanensis Scarbrough, 1988
- Efferia cazieri (Curran, 1953)
- Efferia cellatus (Schiner, 1868)
- Efferia cerdai Tomasovic, 2002
- Efferia chapadensis (Bromley, 1928)
- Efferia cingulata (Bellardi, 1861)
- Efferia clavata Scarbrough & Perez-Gelabert, 2009
- Efferia clementei (Wilcox & Martin, 1945)

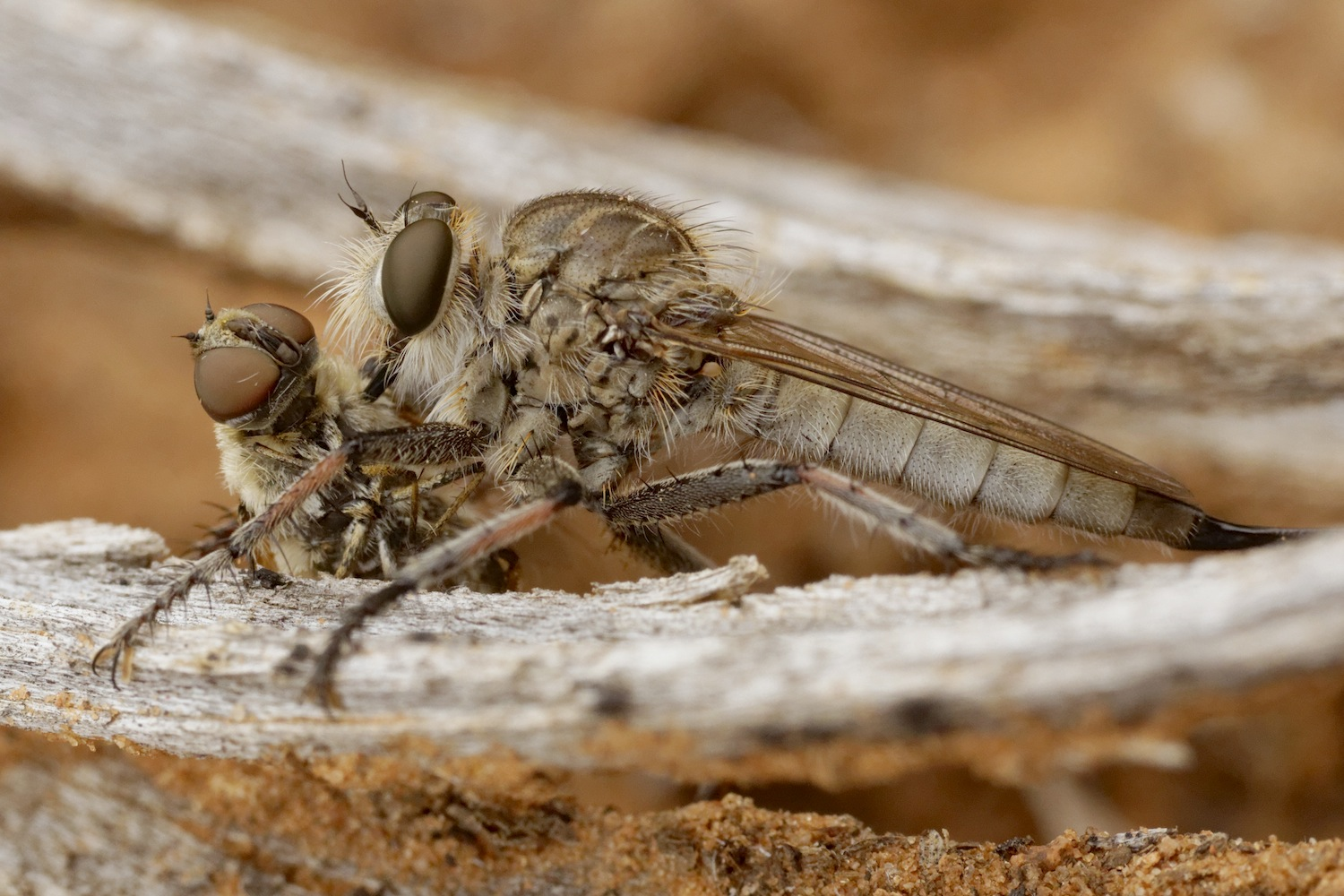
Efferia female feeding on a beefly (probably Villa agrippina)

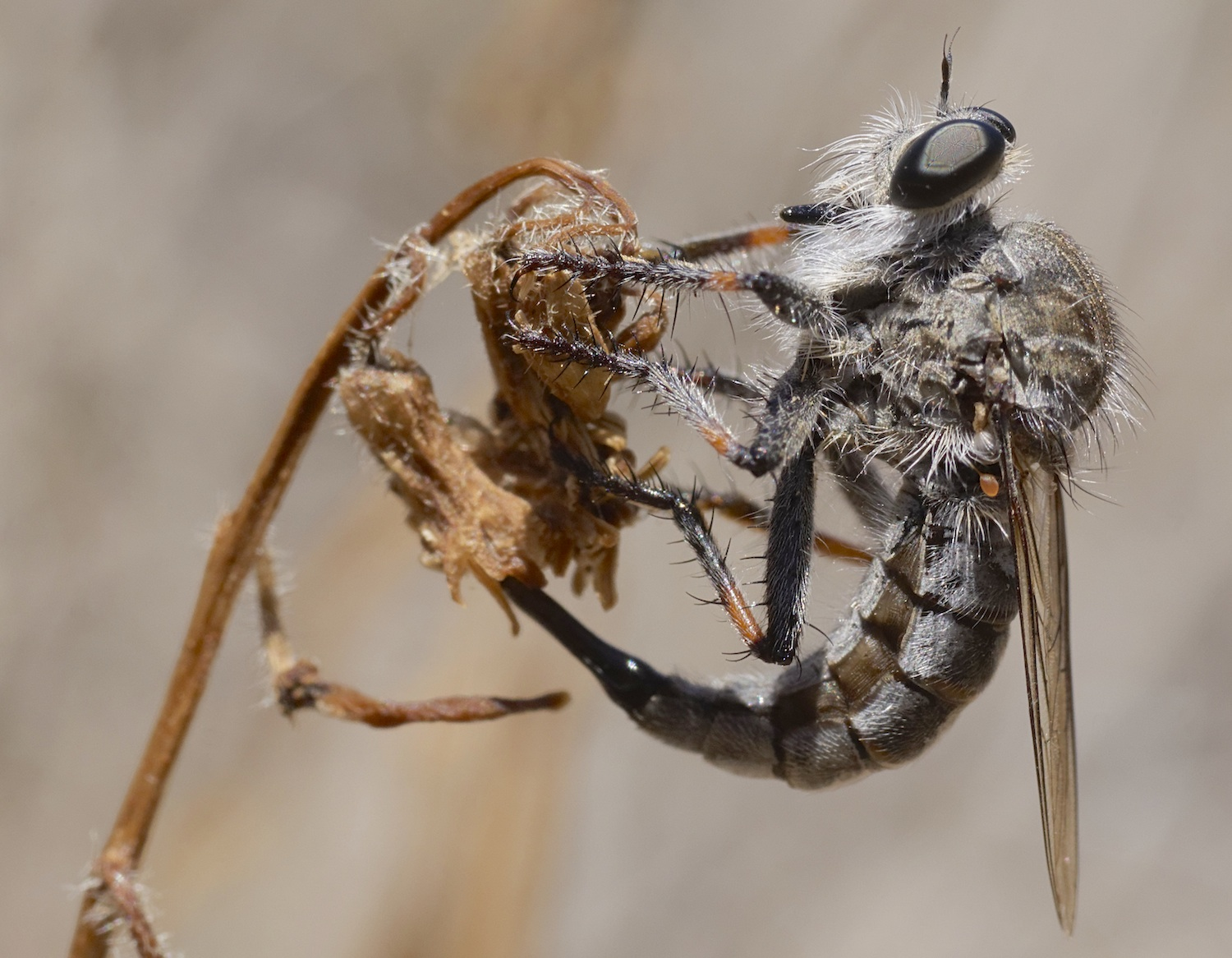
Efferia female using its wedge-shaped ovipositor to lay eggs inside a shriveled flower calyx

- Efferia cockerellorum (James, 1953)
- Efferia commiles (Walker, 1851)
- Efferia completa (Macquart, 1838)
- Efferia concinnata (Williston, 1901)
- Efferia coquilletti (Hine, 1919)
- Efferia costalis (Williston, 1885)
- Efferia coulei (Wilcox, 1966)
- Efferia cressoni (Hine, 1919)
- Efferia cubensis (Bromley, 1929)
- Efferia cuervana (Hardy, 1943)
- Efferia currani (Bromley, 1951)
- Efferia davisi (Wilcox, 1966)
- Efferia demifasciata (Macquart, 1850)
- Efferia deserti (Wilcox, 1966)
- Efferia dilecta (Walker, 1855)
- Efferia dubia (Williston, 1885)
- Efferia duncani (Wilcox, 1966)
- Efferia ehrenbergi (Wilcox, 1966)
- Efferia eraxoides (Curran, 1935)
- Efferia eurylaris (Wiedemann, 1828)
- Efferia exacta Scarbrough & Perez-Gelabert, 2009
- Efferia eximia (Bellardi, 1861)
- Efferia femorata (Macquart, 1838)
- Efferia fisheri Scarbrough, 2012
- Efferia flavida (Wiedemann, 1828)
- Efferia flavofasciata (Wiedemann, 1828)
- Efferia forbesi (Curran, 1931)
- Efferia fortis (Walker, 1855) synonym: Efferia rufitibia (Macquart, 1848)
- Efferia frewingi (Wilcox, 1966)
- Efferia fulvibarbis (Macquart, 1848) synonym: Efferia pachychaeta (Bromley, 1928)
- Efferia fusca (Wiedemann, 1828)
- Efferia fuscanipennis (Macquart, 1850)
- Efferia fuscipennis (Macquart, 1847)
- Efferia garciai Lamas, 1971
- Efferia gila (Wilcox, 1966)
- Efferia gossei (Farr, 1965)
- Efferia grandis (Hine, 1919)
- Efferia haitensis (Macquart, 1848)
- Efferia halli (Wilcox, 1966)
- Efferia haloesa (Walker, 1849)
- Efferia halterata Enderlein, 1914
- Efferia harveyi (Hine, 1919)
- Efferia helenae (Bromley, 1951)
- Efferia heteropterus (Macquart, 1846)
- Efferia hinei Scarbrough, 2008
- Efferia hubbelli (James, 1953)
- Efferia hyalipennis (Macquart, 1838)
- Efferia imbuda (Curran, 1934)
- Efferia imperialis (Forbes, 1988)
- Efferia incisura Scarbrough & Perez-Gelabert, 2009
- Efferia incognita (Forbes, 1987)
- Efferia inflata (Hine, 1911)
- Efferia insula Scarbrough, 2008
- Efferia intermedius Lamas, 1971
- Efferia jubata (Williston, 1885)
- Efferia kansensis (Hine, 1919)
- Efferia kelloggi (Wilcox, 1966)
- Efferia knowltoni (Bromley, 1937)
- Efferia kondratieffi (Bullington & Lavigne, 1984)
- Efferia labidophora (Wiedemann, 1828)
- Efferia lades (Walker, 1849)
- Efferia lasciva (Wiedemann, 1828)
- Efferia latiforceps (Bromley, 1928)
- Efferia latruncula (Williston, 1885)
- Efferia lesbius Lamas, 1971
- Efferia leucocoma (Williston, 1885)
- Efferia loewi (Bellardi, 1862)
- Efferia luna (Wilcox, 1966)
- Efferia macrolabis (Wiedemann, 1828)
- Efferia macroxipha (Forbes, 1988)
- Efferia macularis (Wiedemann, 1821)
- Efferia marginata (Bellardi, 1861)
- Efferia mediana (Wiedemann, 1828)
- Efferia mellina (Wiedemann, 1828)
- Efferia mesquite (Bromley, 1951)
- Efferia mexicana (Hine, 1919)
- Efferia minor (Macquart, 1847)
- Efferia monki (Bromley, 1951)
- Efferia montensis Scarbrough & Perez-Gelabert, 2009
- Efferia mortensoni (Wilcox, 1966)
- Efferia murina (Philippi, 1865)
- Efferia mygidon (Walker, 1851)
- Efferia nemoralis (Hine, 1911)
- Efferia neoinflata (Wilcox, 1966)
- Efferia neosimilis (Forbes, 1987)
- Efferia nigerina (Wiedemann, 1821)
- Efferia nigripes (Macquart, 1850)
- Efferia nigritarsis (Hine, 1919)
- Efferia obscura (Macquart, 1838)
- Efferia okanagana Cannings, 2011 no corresponding record found in GBIF
- Efferia ordwayae (Wilcox, 1966)
- Efferia pallidula (Hine, 1911)
- Efferia parkeri (Wilcox, 1966)
- Efferia parva (Walker, 1855)
- Efferia parvula (Bellardi, 1861)
- Efferia patagoniensis (Macquart, 1850)
- Efferia pavida (Williston, 1901)
- Efferia peralta (Wilcox, 1966)
- Efferia pernicis (Coquillett, 1893)
- Efferia picea Scarbrough & Perez-Gelabert, 2009
- Efferia pictipennis (Schiner, 1868)
- Efferia pilosa (Hine, 1919)
- Efferia pilosula (Bromley, 1929)
- Efferia pina (Scarbrough, 2008)
- Efferia pinali (Wilcox, 1966)
- Efferia plena (Hine, 1916)
- Efferia poecilolampra (James, 1953)
- Efferia pogonias (Wiedemann, 1821)
- Efferia portoricensis (Hine, 1919)
- Efferia prairiensis (Bromley, 1934)
- Efferia prattii (Hine, 1919)
- Efferia producta (Hine, 1919)
- Efferia prolifica (Osten Sacken, 1887)
- Efferia propinqua (Bromley, 1928)
- Efferia pulchripes (Bromley, 1928)
- Efferia pumila (Macquart, 1850)
- Efferia pyrrhogona (Wiedemann, 1828)
- Efferia quadrimaculata (Bellardi, 1861)
- Efferia rapax (Osten Sacken, 1887)
- Efferia remus Tomasovic, 2002
- Efferia rubidiventris (Macquart, 1850)
- Efferia rufina (Wiedemann, 1819)
- Efferia rufipes (Macquart, 1838)
- Efferia rufithorax (Macquart, 1846)
- Efferia sagax (Williston, 1901)
- Efferia satyrus Lamas, 1971
- Efferia schadei (Bromley, 1951)
- Efferia senilis (Wiedemann, 1828)
- Efferia serrula Scarbrough & Perez-Gelabert, 2009
- Efferia setigera (Wilcox, 1966)
- Efferia sicyon (Walker, 1849)
- Efferia similis (Williston, 1885)
- Efferia singularis (Macquart, 1838)
- Efferia sinuosa Scarbrough & Perez-Gelabert, 2009
- Efferia slossonae (Hine, 1919)
- Efferia snowi (Hine, 1919)
- Efferia sonorensis Forbes, 1987
- Efferia speciosa (Philippi, 1865) considered synonym of Eccritosia rubriventris (Philippi, 1865) in GBIF
- Efferia spiniventris (Hine, 1919)
- Efferia spinula Scarbrough & Perez-Gelabert, 2009
- Efferia splendens (Williston, 1901)
- Efferia staminea (Williston, 1885)
- Efferia stigmosa (Carrera & Andretta, 1950)
- Efferia stimicon (Walker, 1851)
- Efferia stylata (Fabricius, 1775) synonym: Efferia tortola (Curran, 1928)
- Efferia subappendiculata (Macquart, 1838)
- Efferia subarida (Bromley, 1940)
- Efferia subchalybea (Bromley, 1928)
- Efferia subcuprea (Schaeffer, 1916)
- Efferia subpilosa (Schaeffer, 1916)
- Efferia suspiciosa Scarbrough & Perez-Gelabert, 2009
- Efferia tabescens (Banks, 1919)
- Efferia tagax (Williston, 1885)
- Efferia tapeats Scarbrough, 2012
- Efferia texana (Banks, 1919)
- Efferia titan (Bromley, 1934)
- Efferia tolandi (Wilcox, 1966)
- Efferia tricella (Bromley, 1951)
- Efferia triton (Osten Sacken, 1887)
- Efferia truncata (Hine, 1911)
- Efferia tuberculata (Coquillett, 1904)
- Efferia tucsoni (Wilcox, 1966)
- Efferia utahensis (Bromley, 1937)
- Efferia varipes (Williston, 1885)
- Efferia vauriei (Curran, 1953)
- Efferia velox (Wiedemann, 1828)
- Efferia vertebrata (Bromley, 1940)
- Efferia vinalensis (Scarbrough, 2008)
- Efferia wilcoxi (Bromley, 1940)
- Efferia willistoni (Hine, 1919) considered homotypic synonym of Neomochtherus willistoni (Hine, 1909) in GBIF
- Efferia woodleyi Scarbrough & Perez-Gelabert, 2009
- Efferia yermo (Wilcox, 1966)
- Efferia yuma (Wilcox, 1966)
- Efferia zetterstedti (Jaennicke, 1865)
- Efferia zonata (Hine, 1919)

== Phylogeny ==
Combined analysis of morphological and molecular characters places Efferia pogonias in a clade corresponding to the subfamily Asilinae, usually with Proctacanthus philadelphicus as sister taxon and always resolving this subfamily as monophyletic.

== See also ==
- List of Asilidae species: E
- Wikispecies page for Efferia
