= Neomochtherus californicus =

Scientific classification
- Domain: Eukaryota
- Kingdom: Animalia
- Phylum: Arthropoda
- Class: Insecta
- Order: Diptera
- Family: Asilidae
- Genus: Neomochtherus
- Species: N. californicus

Binomial name
- Neomochtherus californicus (Hine, 1909)

Synonyms
- Asilus californicus Hine, 1909; Neomochtherus oregonae Martin, 1975

Species of fly

Neomochtherus californicus is a species of robber flies in the family Asilidae.
