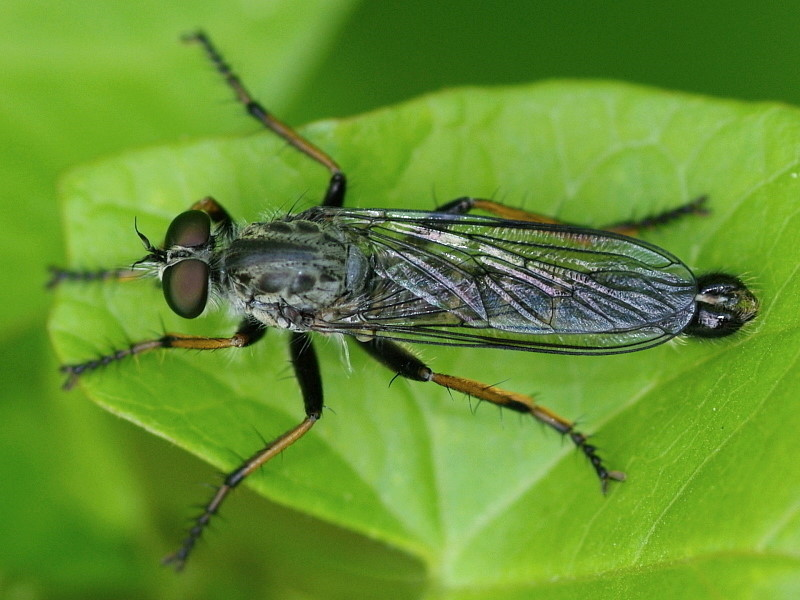
- Male, dorsal view
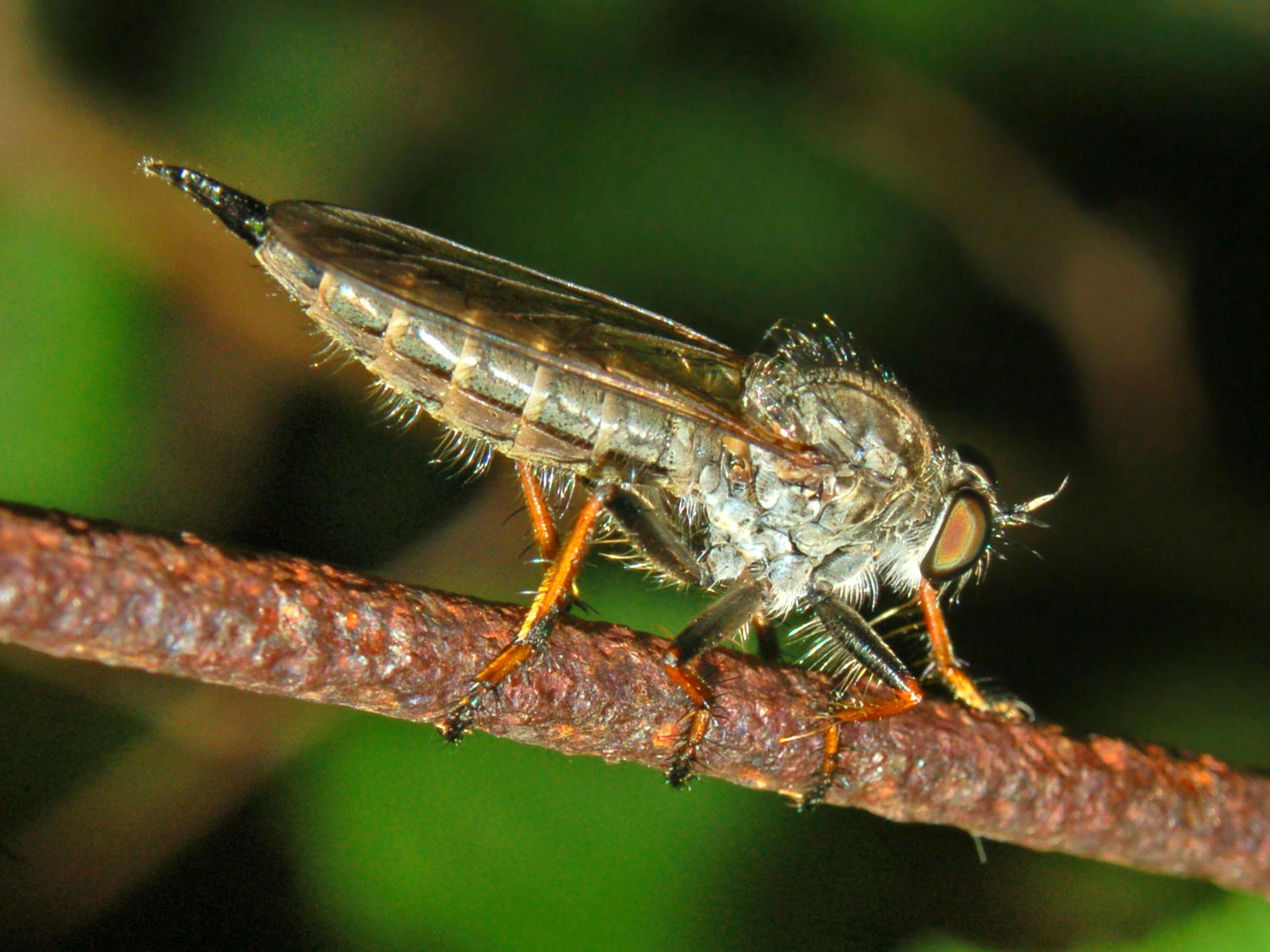
- Female, side view

Scientific classification
- Kingdom: Animalia
- Phylum: Arthropoda
- Clade: Pancrustacea
- Class: Insecta
- Order: Diptera
- Family: Asilidae
- Genus: Neomochtherus
- Species: N. geniculatus

Binomial name
- Neomochtherus geniculatus (Meigen, 1820)

= Neomochtherus geniculatus =

Species of fly

Neomochtherus geniculatus is a species of fly in the robber fly family, Asilidae.

== Distribution ==
This species is present in Europe.

== Description ==
Neomochtherus geniculatus can reach a body length of about 9–20 millimetres (0.35–0.79 in). These robber flies have a small facial gibbosity with a few bristles forming the mystax. Sternites are predominantly shiny. Femora are black. The widest point of the distinctly broadened hypopygium is in the middle.

== Biology ==
Adults can be found from May to September. Larvae feed on beetle larvae of the families Cetoniidae, Lucanidae and Melolonthidae, while adults prey on other flies.

== Gallery ==
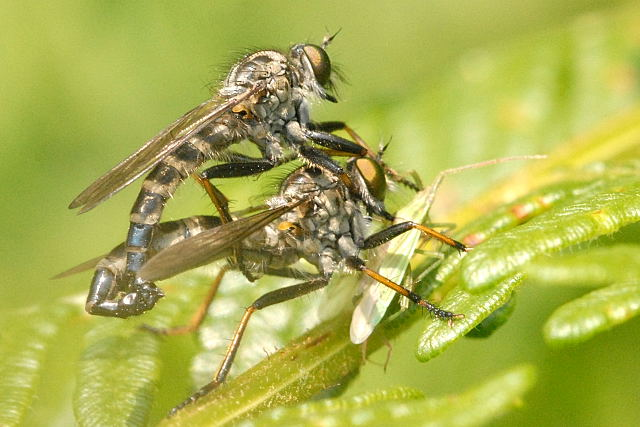
Mating

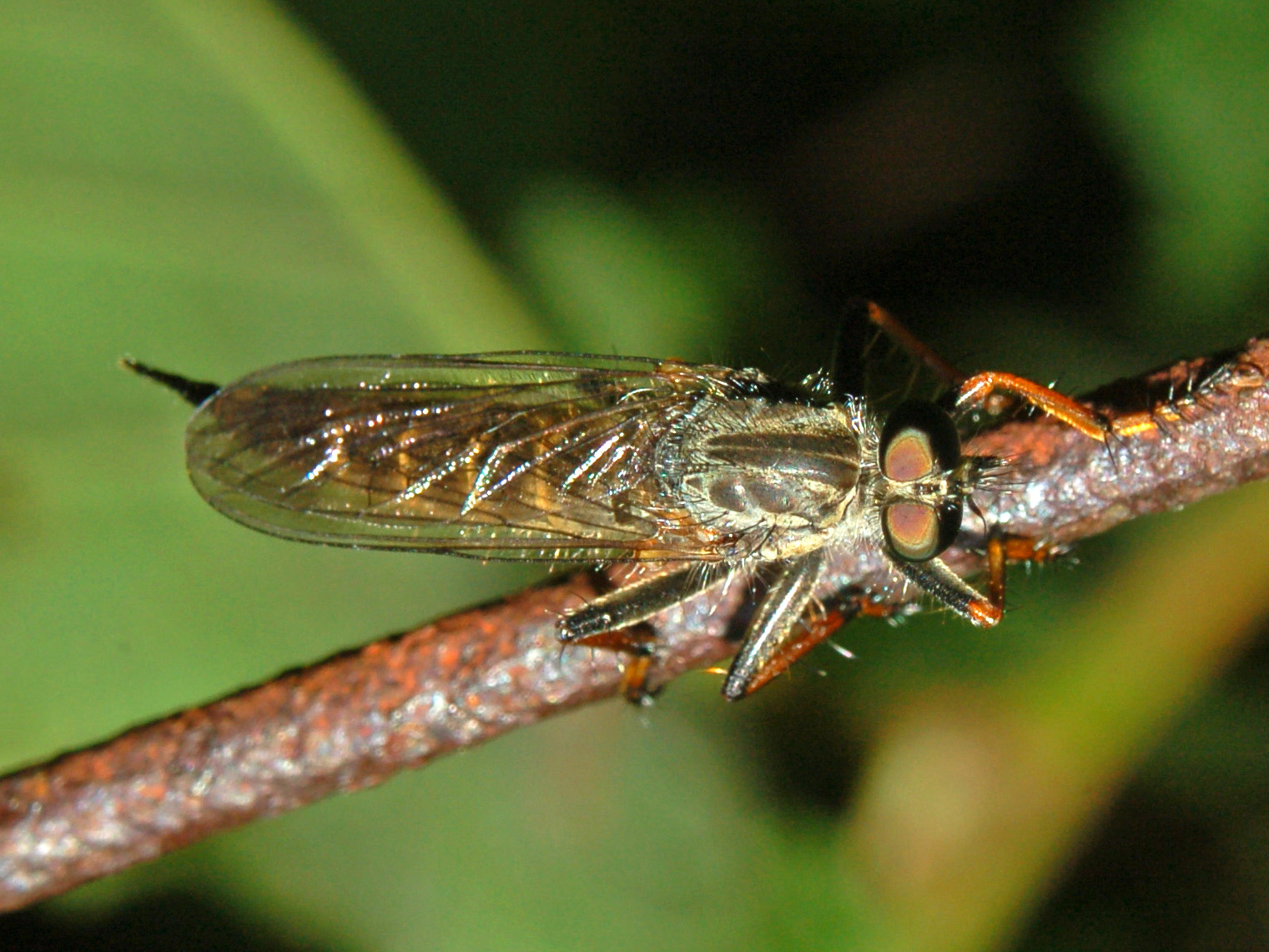
Female, dorsal view

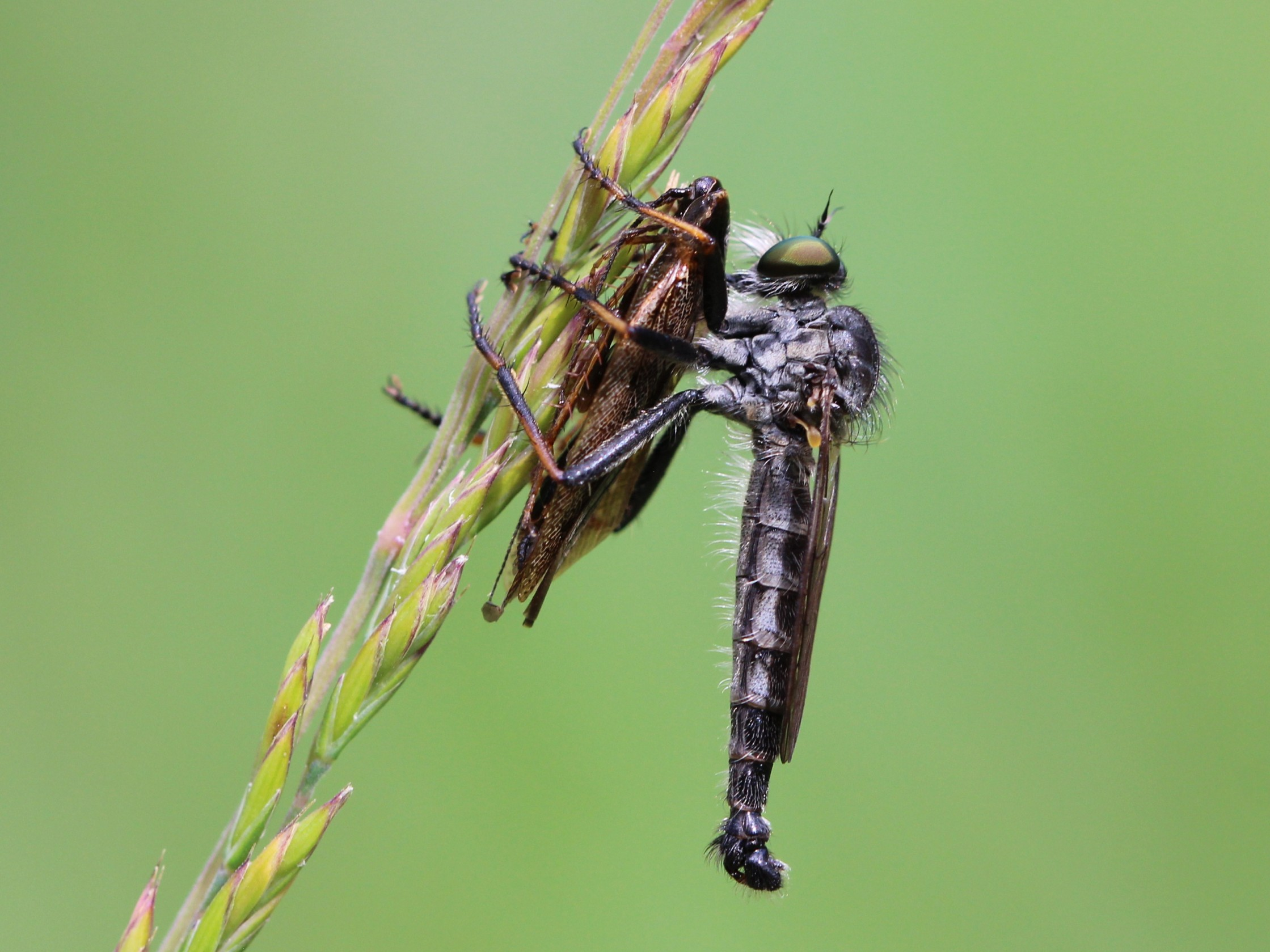
With prey (Ectobius lapponicus)
