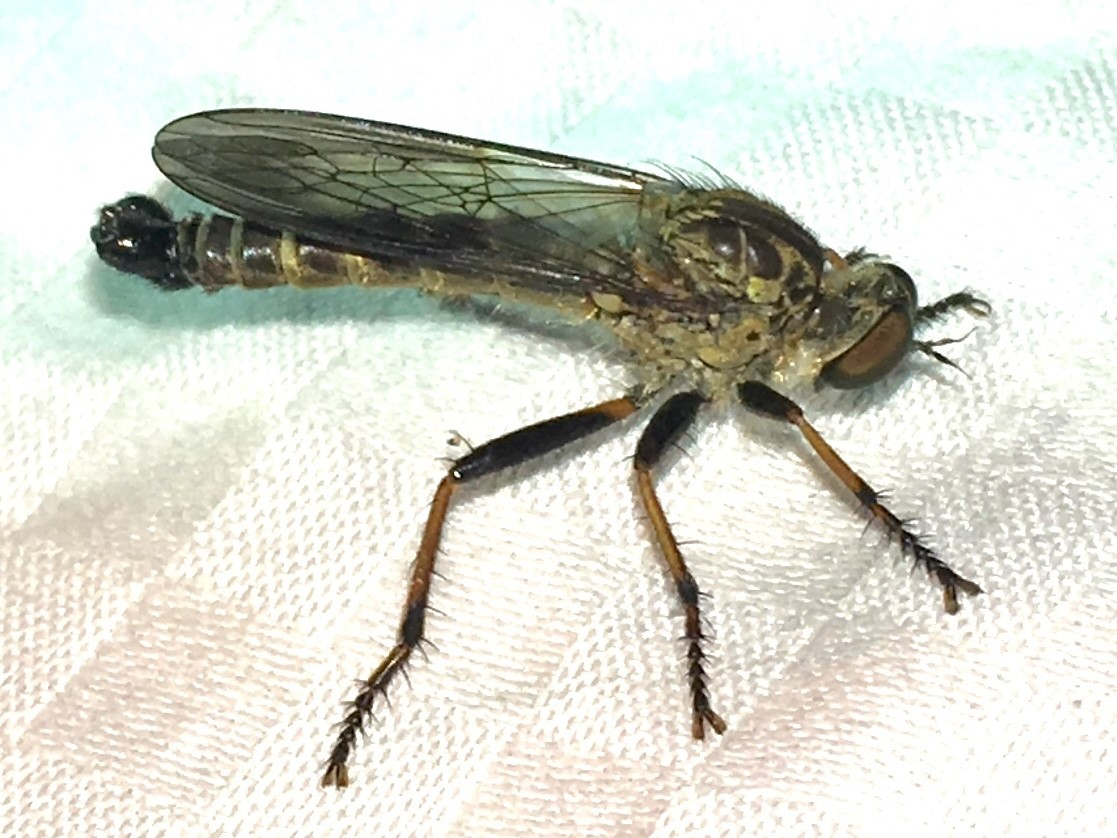

Scientific classification
- Domain: Eukaryota
- Kingdom: Animalia
- Phylum: Arthropoda
- Class: Insecta
- Order: Diptera
- Family: Asilidae
- Genus: Neomochtherus
- Species: N. latipennis

Binomial name
- Neomochtherus latipennis (Hine, 1909)

Synonyms
- Asilus latipennis Hine, 1909

= Neomochtherus latipennis =

Species of fly

Neomochtherus latipennis is a species of robber fly in the family Asilidae.
