= Echthodopa =

Scientific classification
- Kingdom: Animalia
- Phylum: Arthropoda
- Class: Insecta
- Order: Diptera
- Family: Asilidae
- Subfamily: Stenopogoninae
- Genus: Echthodopa; Loew, 1866

Genus of flies

Echthodopa is a genus of robber flies in the family Asilidae. There are at least four described species in Echthodopa.

== Species ==
These four species belong to the genus Echthodopa:

- Echthodopa carolinensis Bromley, 1951
- Echthodopa formosa Loew, 1872
- Echthodopa pubera Loew, 1866
- Echthopoda pubera Loew, 1866
