= Neomochtherus auricomus =

Scientific classification
- Domain: Eukaryota
- Kingdom: Animalia
- Phylum: Arthropoda
- Class: Insecta
- Order: Diptera
- Family: Asilidae
- Genus: Neomochtherus
- Species: N. auricomus

Binomial name
- Neomochtherus auricomus (Hine, 1909)

Synonyms
- Asilus auricomus Hine, 1909

Species of fly

Neomochtherus auricomus is a species of robber flies in the family Asilidae.
