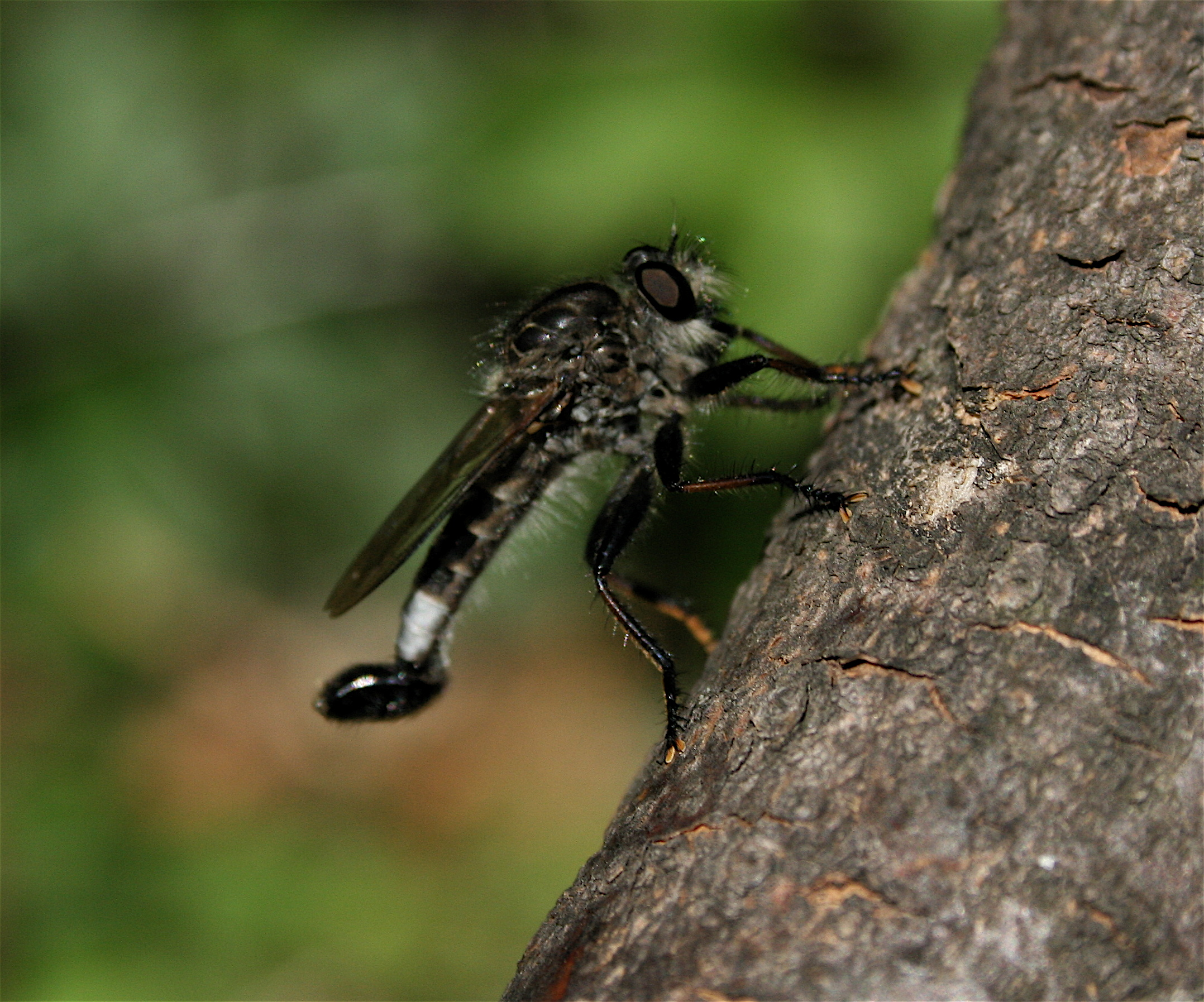
- Efferia aestuans male

Scientific classification
- Kingdom: Animalia
- Phylum: Arthropoda
- Clade: Pancrustacea
- Class: Insecta
- Order: Diptera
- Family: Asilidae
- Genus: Efferia
- Species: E. aestuans

Binomial name
- Efferia aestuans (Linnaeus, 1763)

Synonyms
- Asilus aestuans Linnaeus, 1763; Asilus niger Wiedemann, 1821; Erax bastardi Macquart, 1838; Erax incisuralis Macquart, 1838; Erax tibialis Macquart, 1838

= Efferia aestuans =

Species of fly

== Overview ==
A female Northern Hammertail Robberfly from the top 3/4 view. The 'Dagger of Death' is visible here as a small black point below the female's eyes,

A female Northern Hammertail Robberfly from the side view. Here, the ovipositor of the female is clearly visible.

Efferia aestuans is a species of insect in the family Asilidae, the robber flies. It is native to eastern North America, where it ranges from Ontario and New Hampshire south into Florida and New Mexico. It was originally described as Asilus aestuans in Carl Linnaeus' 1763 work Centuria Insectorum.

Adults are most active from May through September, and tend to be common in their native areas. They live in wetlands, grasslands, sandy, dry areas, and around human settlements/construction.

In their juvenile stage, they live a wingless life underground. They are born and spend their early years in sand dunes, sustaining themselves on grubs. This larval habitat is relatively unusual among robber flies and speaks to a specific adaptation of the Efferia genus.

A common moniker for Efferia aestuans is the Northern, Eastern, or Northeastern Hammertail, so named for the male's hammer-like genital bulb at the tip of his abdomen. This species of Efferia are the most likely to be around and to land on humans, but they are the least likely to harm us (unless mishandled). They pose no great risk to humans and will not bite without direct danger or provocation. They tend to be 'friendly' and relatively docile, and like to land on vegetation or moving animals/humans. They are perch-and-attack predators, meaning they like to perch somewhere and lie in wait for food to come into view. They have a penchant for going after and taking down prey larger than themselves.

Despite being without stingers, Hammertails will sometimes mimic bees or wasps to trick larger predators into staying away from them. They aren't completely defenseless though, as they have a sharp probiscis they both hunt and defend themselves with.

== Adult Anatomy and Identification ==
Efferia aestuans ranges in size from ^{9}/_{16}″ to 1⅛″(14 to 28 mm) in length, but they are more typically ^{11}/_{16}″ to ⅞″ (18 to 22 mm) in length. Males tend to reach an average body length of 18 mm in, and females tend to reach 23 mm.

These insects have heads wider than they are tall. They have two large compound eyes, as well as three ocelli. The large compound eyes do not connect in the middle, and they reach higher than the center of the head, making an almost concave shape in the middle. The ocelli are arranged in an tubercule in the middle of the head, between the compound eyes. Their faces are covered in fine hairs, including a dense, mustache-like mystax along the lower margin and a 'beard' of forward-pointing bristles on the lower part of the face. The mystax tends to have short, bristle-like black hairs with white or yellowish hairs underneath. This facial hair helps to protect the Hammertail's face from its thrashing prey while it's on the hunt.

Carnivorous and effective hunters, Efferia aestuans have dagger-like mouthparts that they employ to take down their prey. This long, hollow beak, sometimes referred to as 'The Dagger of Death', functions by delivering a potent mix of paralyzing toxins and digestive enzymes. This keeps the prey insect still while liquifying its insides, which the Hammertail then drinks with the same mouthpart. They can also turn their heads a near 360° to spot prey and threats alike. Their diets are varied, including insects such as flies, bees, butterflies, moths, grasshoppers, and dragonflies.

The thorax is bright, high, and moderately arched. The scuttellum (the plate between the abdomen and thorax) is swollen and has 6 bristles on the margin, 4 black and 2 whitish.

A female Northern Hammertail Robberfly from the top 3/4 view. The wideness of its head is more noticeable from above.

The abdomen is long and slender, tapering towards the end.

On the female, the sides and rear margins of segments 2-6 are covered in grey pollinose (pollen-like dust). The rear margin of segment 7 and the upper sides of all segments have brown pollinose but appear black. The hairs on the upper side are short and black, while the hairs on the side are yellowish-white. The ovipositor is usually ¼" (6 mm) long.

On the male, the sides of segments 2-4, the rear margin of segment 4, and all of section 5-7 have white pollinose. The lower surface of the abdomen is covered in long, white hairs. These colors make for effective natural camouflage for both males and females, giving them more stealth when hiding and hunting.

Their legs are black and stout, covered in black and yellowish-white hairs with hardy black bristles. The 4th leg segment (tibia) on each leg is mostly brown or dull red, with black just at the tip. The last part of the leg (tarsus), corresponding to the foot, has 5 segments, with two paw pads at the tip.

Their wings are long and slim, transparent with brown veins and tinged a smoky amber color. The subcostal cell is brown, and there are 3 complete submarginal cells. Their wingspans range from 1 ^{3}/_{16}_{"} - 1 ^{31}/_{32} (30 mm - 50 mm).

The males and females can be easily differentiated by the ends of their abdomens. Males will have a black hammer-like genital bulb that is rounded at the tip. It projects upwards at an approximately 30° angle. This bulb tends to be as long as segments 6 and 7 together. Females will have a long, sword-like ovipositor that resembles a stinger, but it is actually used to bore into rotting wood to safely deposit her eggs.

Mating pairs can remain connected for long periods of time, with the larger female sometimes carrying the smaller male around on her back while she continues to hunt for food.

A complete adapted identification key for Eastern Efferia can be found on online, which can be helpful in differentiating Efferia aestuans from its close family.
