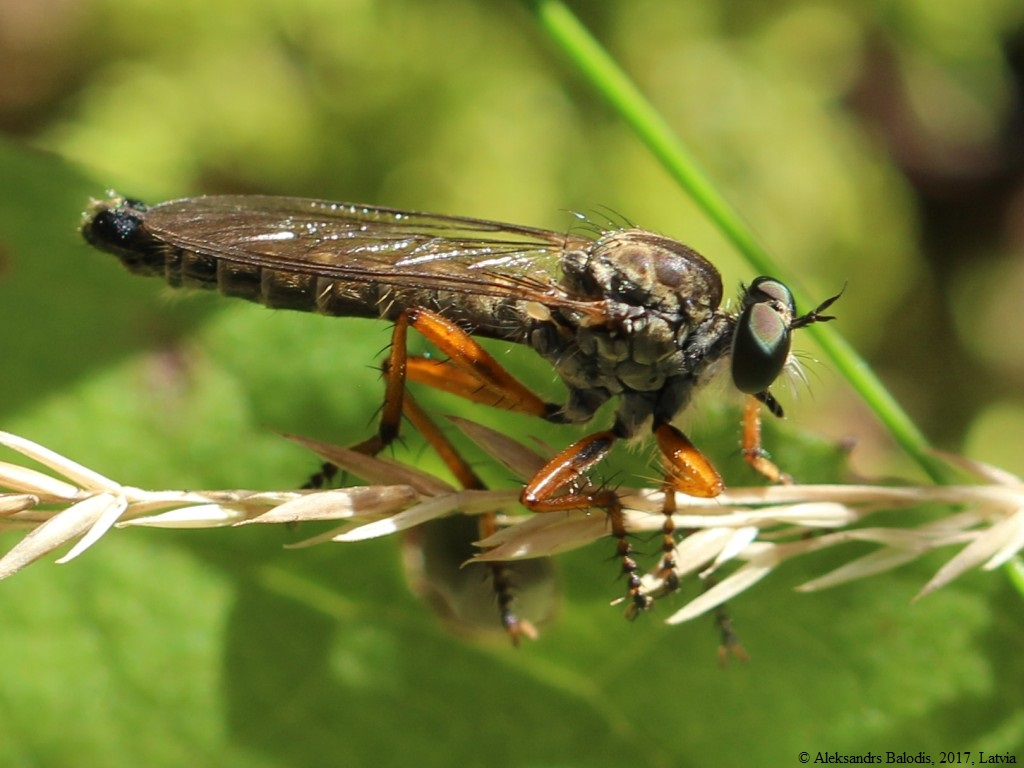

Scientific classification
- Kingdom: Animalia
- Phylum: Arthropoda
- Clade: Pancrustacea
- Class: Insecta
- Order: Diptera
- Family: Asilidae
- Subfamily: Asilinae
- Genus: Neomochtherus
- Species: N. pallipes

Binomial name
- Neomochtherus pallipes (Meigen, 1820)

Synonyms
- Asilus omissus Meigen & Wiedemann, 1820; Asilus pallipes Meigen, 1820; Asilus pallips Meigen, 1820; Asilus xanthopus Meigen, 1820; Leptogaster longipennis Meigen, 1820

= Neomochtherus pallipes =

Species of fly

Neomochtherus pallipes, the Devon red-legged robber fly, is a species of robber fly in the family Asilidae.

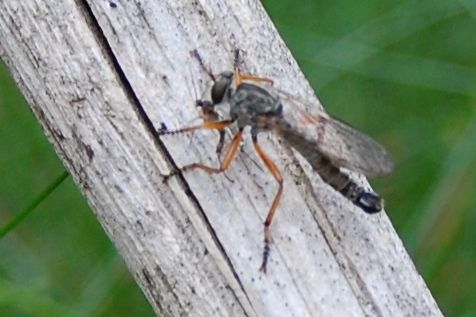
Devon red-legged robber fly, Neomochtherus pallipes

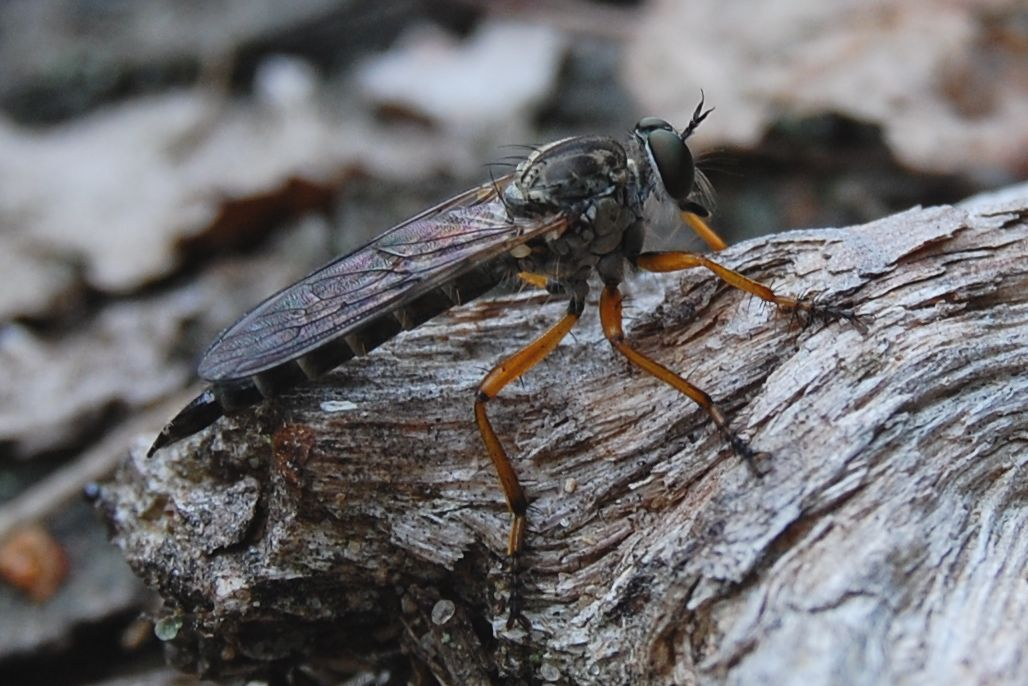
Devon red-legged robber fly, Neomochtherus pallipes

== Description ==
It ia a medium-sized robberfly (body length to 15 mm) Diagnostic are the bright red legs; all femora have a dark streak on the anterior face and the tibiae are darkened at their tips; shiny-black sternites and rather the flat face in lateral view.
