= Neomochtherus comosus =

Scientific classification
- Domain: Eukaryota
- Kingdom: Animalia
- Phylum: Arthropoda
- Class: Insecta
- Order: Diptera
- Family: Asilidae
- Genus: Neomochtherus
- Species: N. comosus

Binomial name
- Neomochtherus comosus (Hine, 1918)

Synonyms
- Asilus comosus Hine, 1918; Asilus persimilis Banks, 1920

Species of fly

Neomochtherus comosus is a species of robber flies in the family Asilidae.
