= Efferia apicalis =

Scientific classification
- Domain: Eukaryota
- Kingdom: Animalia
- Phylum: Arthropoda
- Class: Insecta
- Order: Diptera
- Family: Asilidae
- Genus: Efferia
- Species: E. apicalis

Binomial name
- Efferia apicalis (Wiedemann, 1821)

Synonyms
- Asilus apicalis Wiedemann, 1821; Erax vicinus Macquart, 1846

Species of fly

Efferia apicalis is a species of robber flies in the family Asilidae.
