= Efferia tuberculata =

Scientific classification
- Domain: Eukaryota
- Kingdom: Animalia
- Phylum: Arthropoda
- Class: Insecta
- Order: Diptera
- Family: Asilidae
- Genus: Efferia
- Species: E. tuberculata

Binomial name
- Efferia tuberculata (Coquillett, 1904)

Synonyms
- Erax tuberculata Coquillett, 1904

Species of fly

Efferia tuberculata is a species of robber flies in the family Asilidae.
