= Efferia inflata =

Scientific classification
- Domain: Eukaryota
- Kingdom: Animalia
- Phylum: Arthropoda
- Class: Insecta
- Order: Diptera
- Family: Asilidae
- Genus: Efferia
- Species: E. inflata

Binomial name
- Efferia inflata (Hine, 1911)

Synonyms
- Erax inflatus Hine, 1911

Species of fly

Efferia inflata is a species of robber fly in the family Asilidae.
