= Efferia benedicti =

Scientific classification
- Domain: Eukaryota
- Kingdom: Animalia
- Phylum: Arthropoda
- Class: Insecta
- Order: Diptera
- Family: Asilidae
- Genus: Efferia
- Species: E. benedicti

Binomial name
- Efferia benedicti (Bromley, 1940)

Synonyms
- Erax benedicti Bromley, 1940

Species of fly

Efferia benedicti is a species of robber flies in the family Asilidae.
