= Efferia triton =

Scientific classification
- Domain: Eukaryota
- Kingdom: Animalia
- Phylum: Arthropoda
- Class: Insecta
- Order: Diptera
- Family: Asilidae
- Genus: Efferia
- Species: E. triton

Binomial name
- Efferia triton (Osten Sacken, 1887)

Synonyms
- Erax anomalus Authors, Not Bellardi, 1987; Erax triton Osten Sacken, 1887

Species of fly

Efferia triton is a species of robber flies in the family Asilidae.
