= Efferia snowi =

Scientific classification
- Domain: Eukaryota
- Kingdom: Animalia
- Phylum: Arthropoda
- Class: Insecta
- Order: Diptera
- Family: Asilidae
- Genus: Efferia
- Species: E. snowi

Binomial name
- Efferia snowi (Hine, 1919)

Synonyms
- Erax snowi Hine, 1919

Species of fly

Efferia snowi is a species of robber flies in the family Asilidae.

The species, first described in 1919, is recognized for its predatory behavior.
