= Efferia latruncula =

Scientific classification
- Domain: Eukaryota
- Kingdom: Animalia
- Phylum: Arthropoda
- Class: Insecta
- Order: Diptera
- Family: Asilidae
- Genus: Efferia
- Species: E. latruncula

Binomial name
- Efferia latruncula (Williston, 1885)

Synonyms
- Erax latrunculus Williston, 1885

Species of fly

Efferia latruncula is a species of robber flies in the family Asilidae.
