= Efferia candida =

Scientific classification
- Kingdom: Animalia
- Phylum: Arthropoda
- Clade: Pancrustacea
- Class: Insecta
- Order: Diptera
- Family: Asilidae
- Genus: Efferia
- Species: E. candida

Binomial name
- Efferia candida Coquillett, 1893

Species of fly

Efferia candida is a species of robber flies in the family Asilidae.
