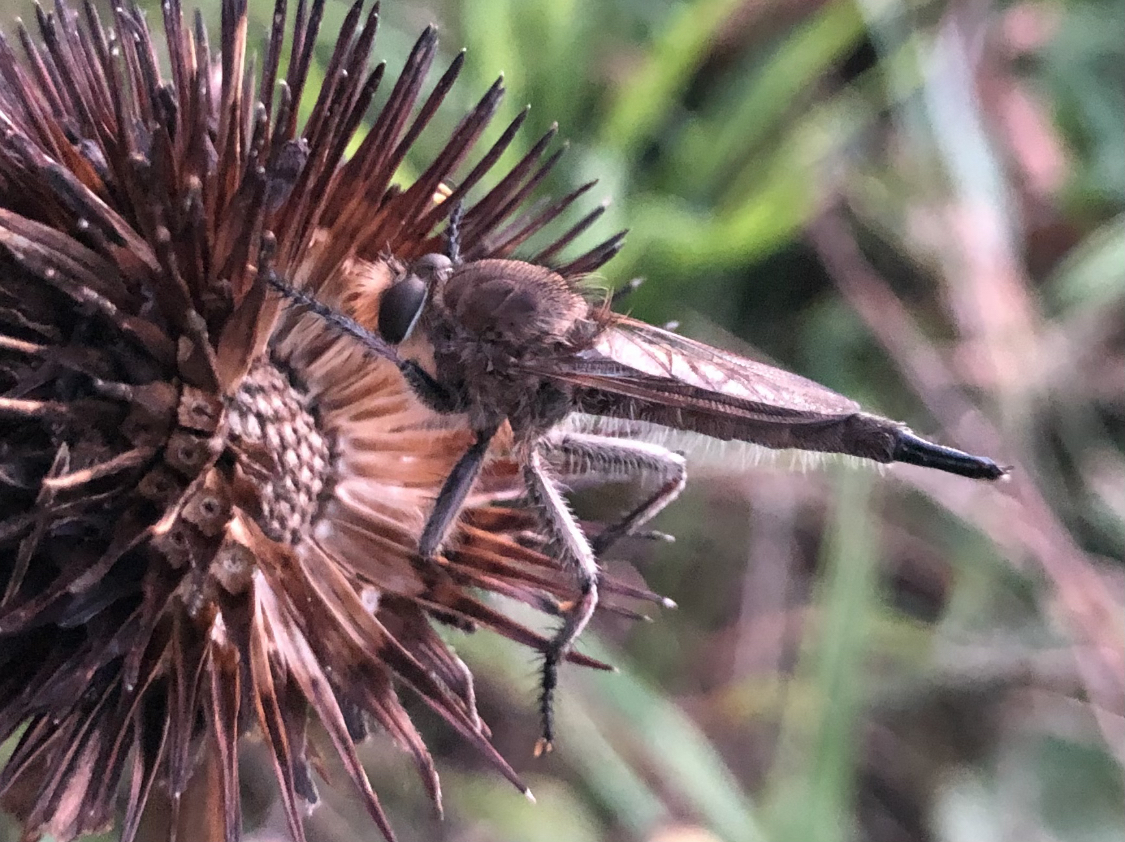
- A female Efferia pogonias perched on vegetation in Connecticut, USA

Scientific classification
- Kingdom: Animalia
- Phylum: Arthropoda
- Class: Insecta
- Order: Diptera
- Family: Asilidae
- Genus: Efferia
- Species: E. pogonias

Binomial name
- Efferia pogonias (Wiedemann, 1821)

Synonyms
- Asilus dascyllus Walker, 1849; Asilus pogonias Wiedemann, 1821; Dasypogon barbatus Fabricius, 1805; Erax rufibarbis Macquart, 1838; Proctacanthus virginianus Wulp, 1882

= Efferia pogonias =

Species of fly

Efferia pogonias is a species of robber fly in the subfamily Asilinae. Sometimes referred to as the yellow-bearded hammertail, it is endemic to the eastern United States, where it occurs from Maine to Georgia in the east, and westward at least to Minnesota and Texas; records from Florida may not be valid. This species prefers open and dry conditions, including sandy locations inland. It is active from May to October, but activity peaks in fall, especially September. Females lay their eggs in soil.

Measuring 16–30 mm (0.63–1.18 in) in length, the species is a deep, dark brown across its body, with darkened wings and very dark legs; the tibiae may have a dark red tinge. The mystax or "beard" of setae on the face is prominent and yellowish in color. The last two abdominal segments (numbers 6 and 7) are bright white in males. On females, the ovipositor is dark and somewhat rounded. Like other robber flies in the genus Efferia, they are ambush predators, lying still on soil or low vegetation before sallying out to capture prey.
