= Efferia tricella =

Scientific classification
- Domain: Eukaryota
- Kingdom: Animalia
- Phylum: Arthropoda
- Class: Insecta
- Order: Diptera
- Family: Asilidae
- Genus: Efferia
- Species: E. tricella

Binomial name
- Efferia tricella (Bromley, 1951)

Synonyms
- Erax tricellus Bromley, 1951

Species of fly

Efferia tricella is a species of robber flies in the family Asilidae.
