= Efferia armata =

Scientific classification
- Domain: Eukaryota
- Kingdom: Animalia
- Phylum: Arthropoda
- Class: Insecta
- Order: Diptera
- Family: Asilidae
- Genus: Efferia
- Species: E. armata

Binomial name
- Efferia armata (Hine, 1918)

Synonyms
- Erax armatus Hine, 1918

Species of fly

Efferia armata is a species of robber flies in the family Asilidae.
