= Efferia prairiensis =

Scientific classification
- Domain: Eukaryota
- Kingdom: Animalia
- Phylum: Arthropoda
- Class: Insecta
- Order: Diptera
- Family: Asilidae
- Genus: Efferia
- Species: E. prairiensis

Binomial name
- Efferia prairiensis (Bromley, 1934)

Synonyms
- Erax prairiensis Bromley, 1934

Species of fly

Efferia prairiensis is a species of robber flies in the family Asilidae.
