= Efferia plena =

Yellow Hammertail

Scientific classification
- Kingdom: Animalia
- Phylum: Arthropoda
- Class: Insecta
- Order: Diptera
- Family: Asilidae
- Genus: Efferia
- Species: E. plena

Binomial name
- Efferia plena (Hine, 1916)

Synonyms
- Erax plenus Hine, 1916

Species of fly

Efferia plena is a species of robber flies in the family Asilidae.
