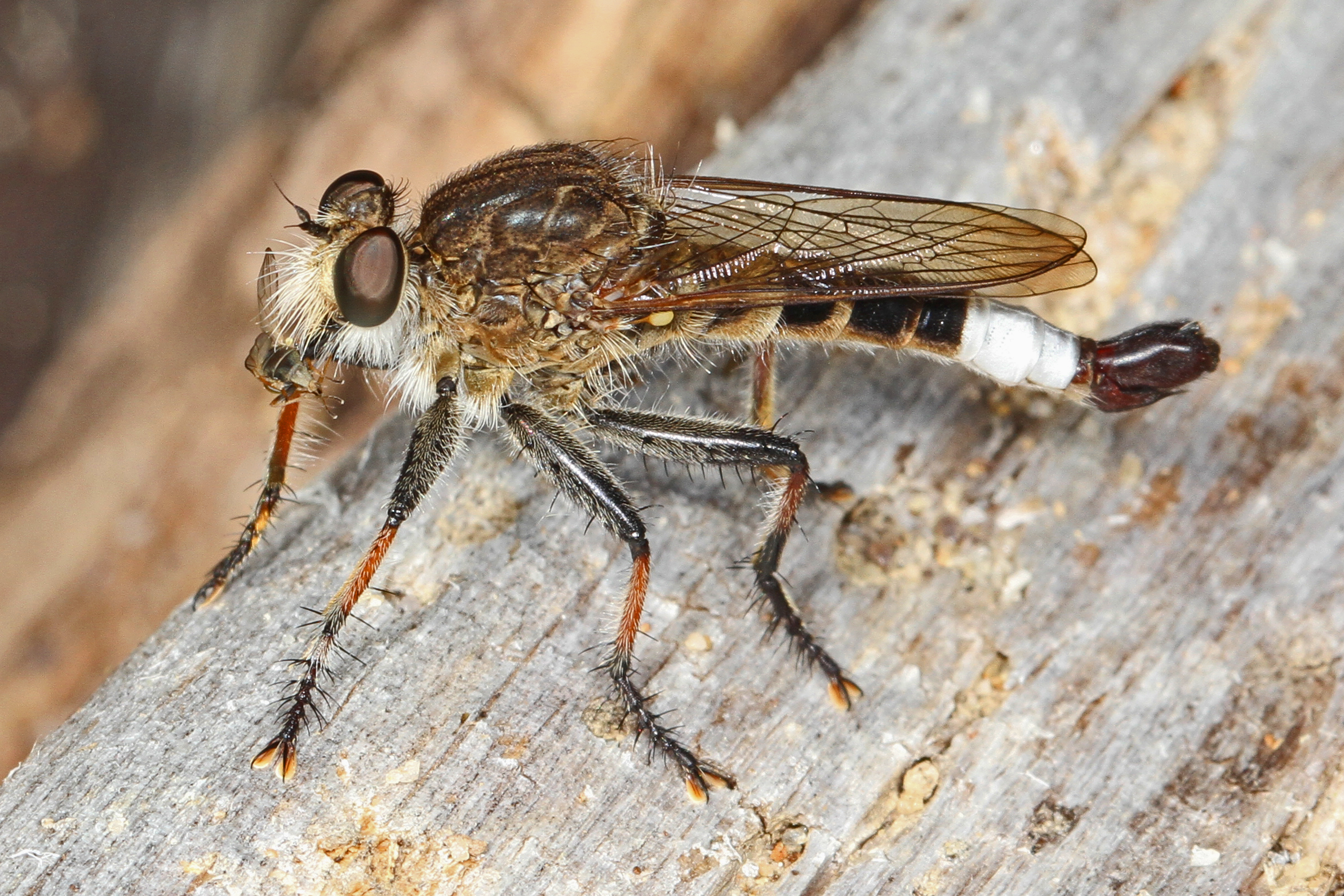

Scientific classification
- Domain: Eukaryota
- Kingdom: Animalia
- Phylum: Arthropoda
- Class: Insecta
- Order: Diptera
- Family: Asilidae
- Genus: Efferia
- Species: E. albibarbis

Binomial name
- Efferia albibarbis (Macquart, 1838)

Synonyms
- Erax albibarbis Macquart, 1838; Erax furax Williston, 1885

= Efferia albibarbis =

Species of fly

Efferia albibarbis is a species of robber fly in the family Asilidae. It is a known predator of Cicindela hirticollis and Habroscelimorpha dorsalis dorsalis.
