= Echthodopa formosa =

Scientific classification
- Domain: Eukaryota
- Kingdom: Animalia
- Phylum: Arthropoda
- Class: Insecta
- Order: Diptera
- Family: Asilidae
- Genus: Echthodopa
- Species: E. formosa

Binomial name
- Echthodopa formosa Loew, 1872

Species of fly

Echthodopa formosa is a species of robber flies in the family Asilidae.
