= Efferia tabescens =

Scientific classification
- Domain: Eukaryota
- Kingdom: Animalia
- Phylum: Arthropoda
- Class: Insecta
- Order: Diptera
- Family: Asilidae
- Genus: Efferia
- Species: E. tabescens

Binomial name
- Efferia tabescens (Banks, 1919

Synonyms
- Erax tabescens Banks, 1919

Species of fly

Efferia tabescens is a species of robber flies in the family Asilidae.
