= Echthodopa pubera =

Scientific classification
- Domain: Eukaryota
- Kingdom: Animalia
- Phylum: Arthropoda
- Class: Insecta
- Order: Diptera
- Family: Asilidae
- Genus: Echthodopa
- Species: E. pubera

Binomial name
- Echthodopa pubera Loew, 1866

Species of fly

Echthodopa pubera is a species of robber flies in the family Asilidae.
