= Mystax =

Mystax may refer to:

- Thiotricha Meyrick, 1885, a genus of moths in the family Gelechiidae, of which Mystax Caradja, 1920 is a junior synonym.
- Mystax, in insect anatomy, is a line or group of prominent bristles found on the lower face of many robber flies (family Asilidae).
- Mystax, in Doric Greek and Latin, is a noun for mustache or upper lip.
