= Efferia mortensoni =

Scientific classification
- Domain: Eukaryota
- Kingdom: Animalia
- Phylum: Arthropoda
- Class: Insecta
- Order: Diptera
- Family: Asilidae
- Genus: Efferia
- Species: E. mortensoni

Binomial name
- Efferia mortensoni Wilcox, 1966

Species of fly

Efferia mortensoni is a species of robber flies in the family Asilidae.
