= Efferia bicaudata =

Scientific classification
- Kingdom: Animalia
- Phylum: Arthropoda
- Clade: Pancrustacea
- Class: Insecta
- Order: Diptera
- Family: Asilidae
- Genus: Efferia
- Species: E. bicaudata

Binomial name
- Efferia bicaudata (Hine, 1919)

Synonyms
- Erax bicaudatus Hine, 1919

Species of fly

Efferia bicaudata is a species of robber flies in the family Asilidae.

== Taxonomy ==
Full classification
Domain	Eukaryota
Kingdom	Animalia
Phylum	Arthropoda
Subphylum	Hexapoda
Class	Insecta
Order	Dipteria
Infraorder	Orthorrhapha
Superfamily	Asiloidea
Family	Asilidae
Subfamily	Asilinae
Clade	Pogonias
Genus	Efferia
Species	E. bicaudata
