= Efferia bicolor =

Scientific classification
- Kingdom: Animalia
- Phylum: Arthropoda
- Clade: Pancrustacea
- Class: Insecta
- Order: Diptera
- Family: Asilidae
- Genus: Efferia
- Species: E. bicolor

Binomial name
- Efferia bicolor (Bellardi, 1861)

Synonyms
- Erax bicolor Bellardi, 1861

Species of fly

Efferia bicolor is a species of robber flies in the family Asilidae.
