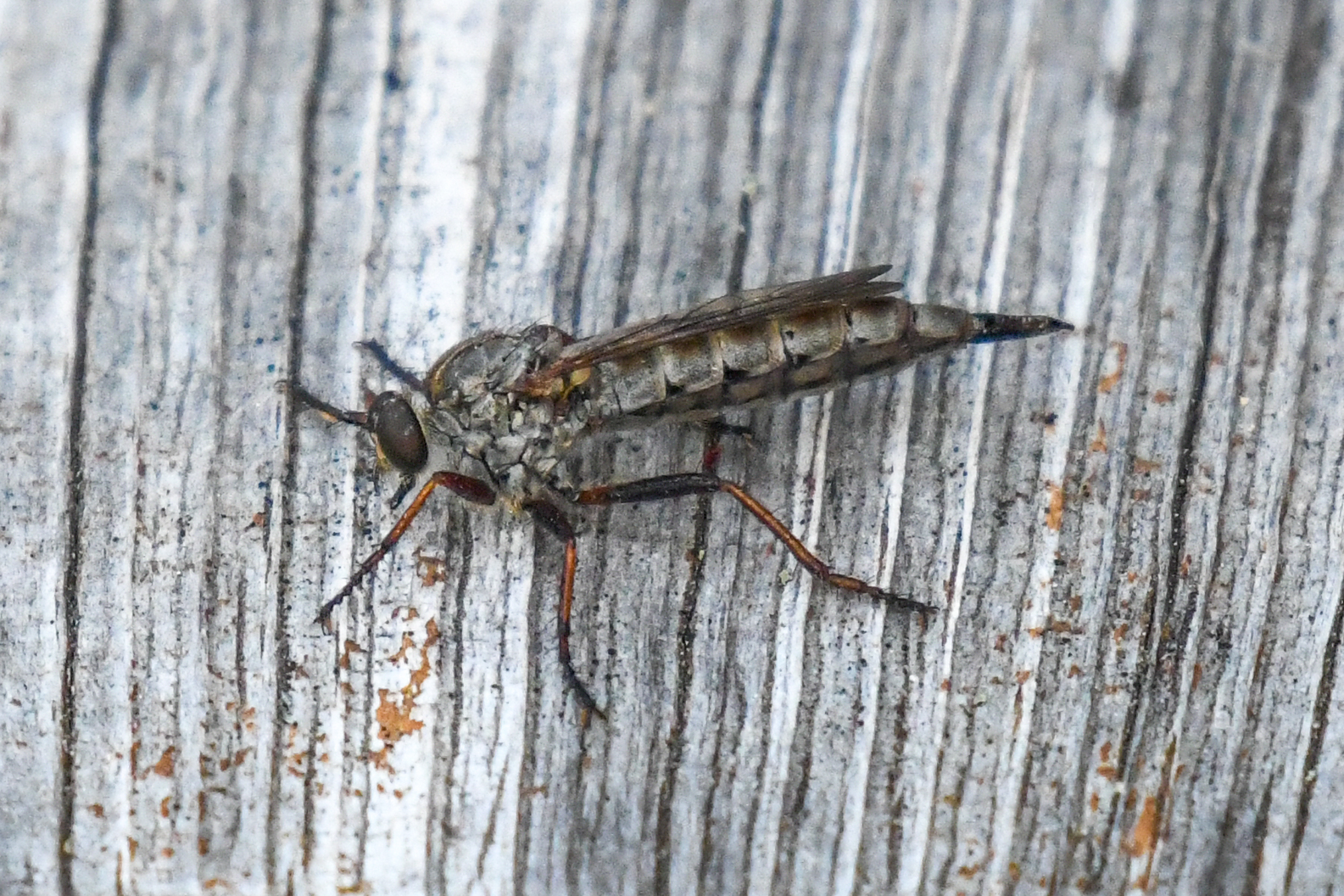

Scientific classification
- Domain: Eukaryota
- Kingdom: Animalia
- Phylum: Arthropoda
- Class: Insecta
- Order: Diptera
- Family: Asilidae
- Genus: Neomochtherus
- Species: N. willistoni

Binomial name
- Neomochtherus willistoni (Hine, 1909)

= Neomochtherus willistoni =

Species of fly

Neomochtherus willistoni is a species of robber fly in the family Asilidae.
