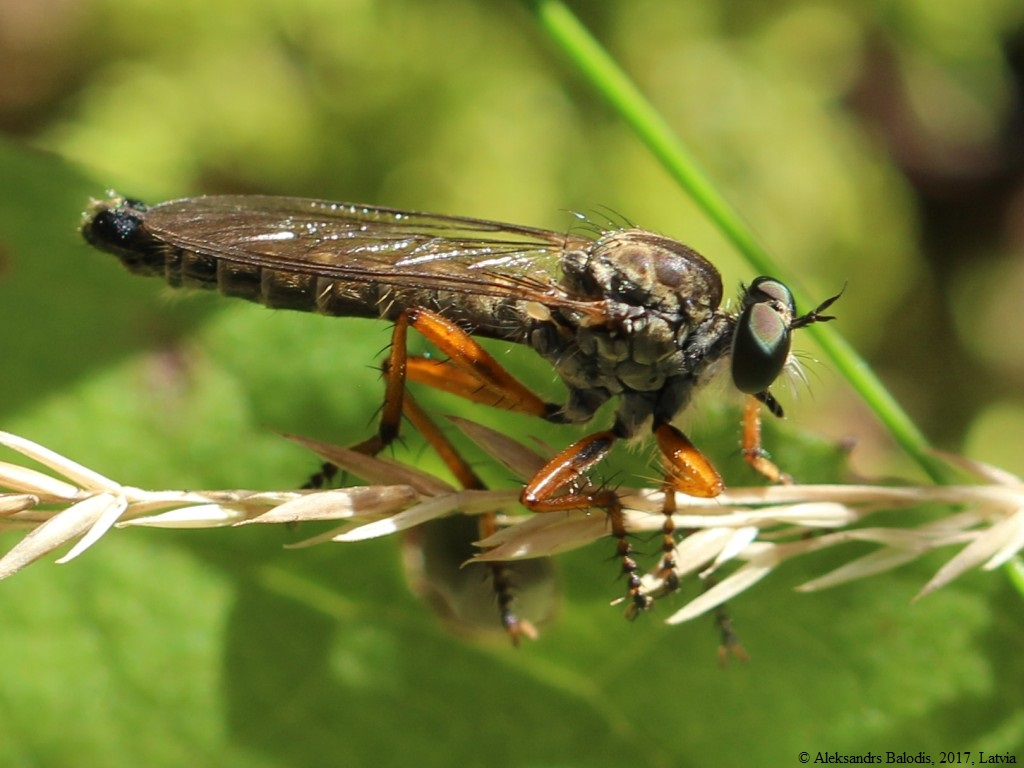
- Neomochtherus pallipes

Scientific classification
- Domain: Eukaryota
- Kingdom: Animalia
- Phylum: Arthropoda
- Class: Insecta
- Order: Diptera
- Family: Asilidae
- Subfamily: Asilinae
- Genus: Neomochtherus; Osten Sacken, 1878

= Neomochtherus =

Genus of flies

Neomochtherus is a genus of robber flies in the family Asilidae. There are at least 140 described species in Neomochtherus.

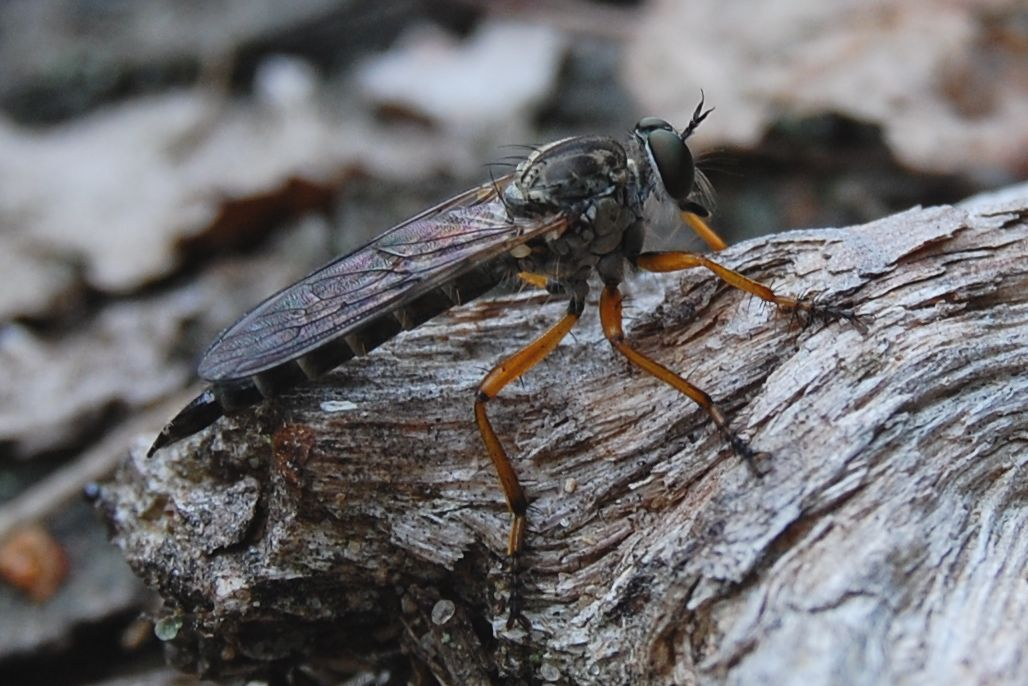
Neomochtherus pallipes

== See also ==
- List of Neomochtherus species
