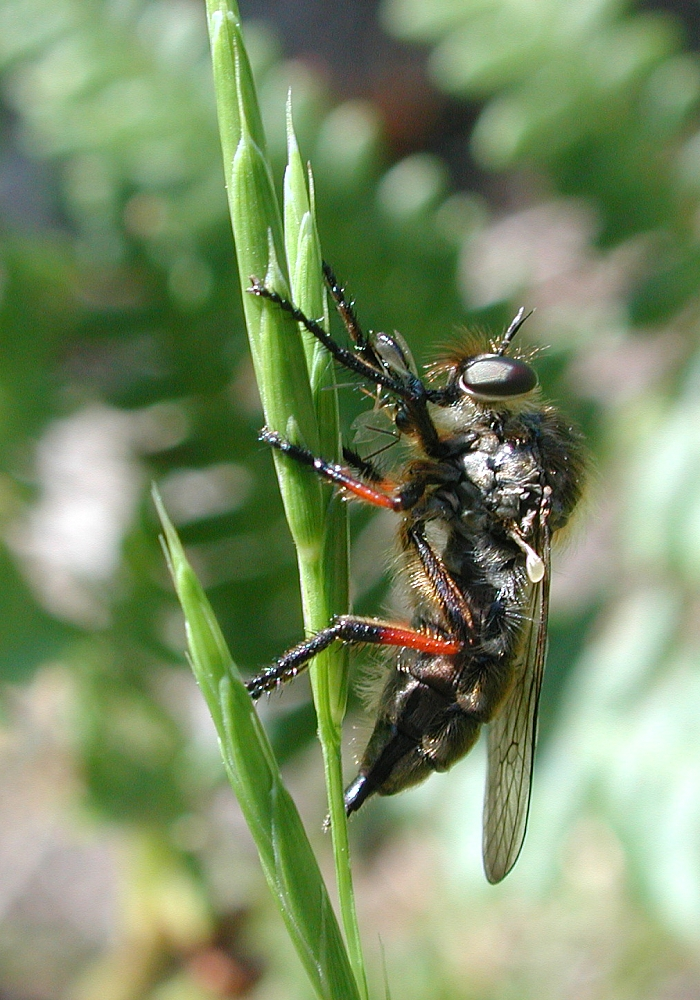
- Leptarthrus brevirostris

Scientific classification
- Kingdom: Animalia
- Phylum: Arthropoda
- Class: Insecta
- Order: Diptera
- Family: Asilidae
- Subfamily: Dasypogoninae
- Tribe: Isopogonini
- Genus: Leptarthrus; Stephens, 1829

Species
- L. brevirostris (Meigen, 1804); L. krali Hradský & Geller-Grimm, 1997; L. vitripennis (Meigen, 1820)

Synonyms
- Isopogon Loew, 1847

= Leptarthrus =

Genus of flies

Leptarthrus is a genus of robber-flies, Most species are found throughout Europe, and there is one Chinese species.
