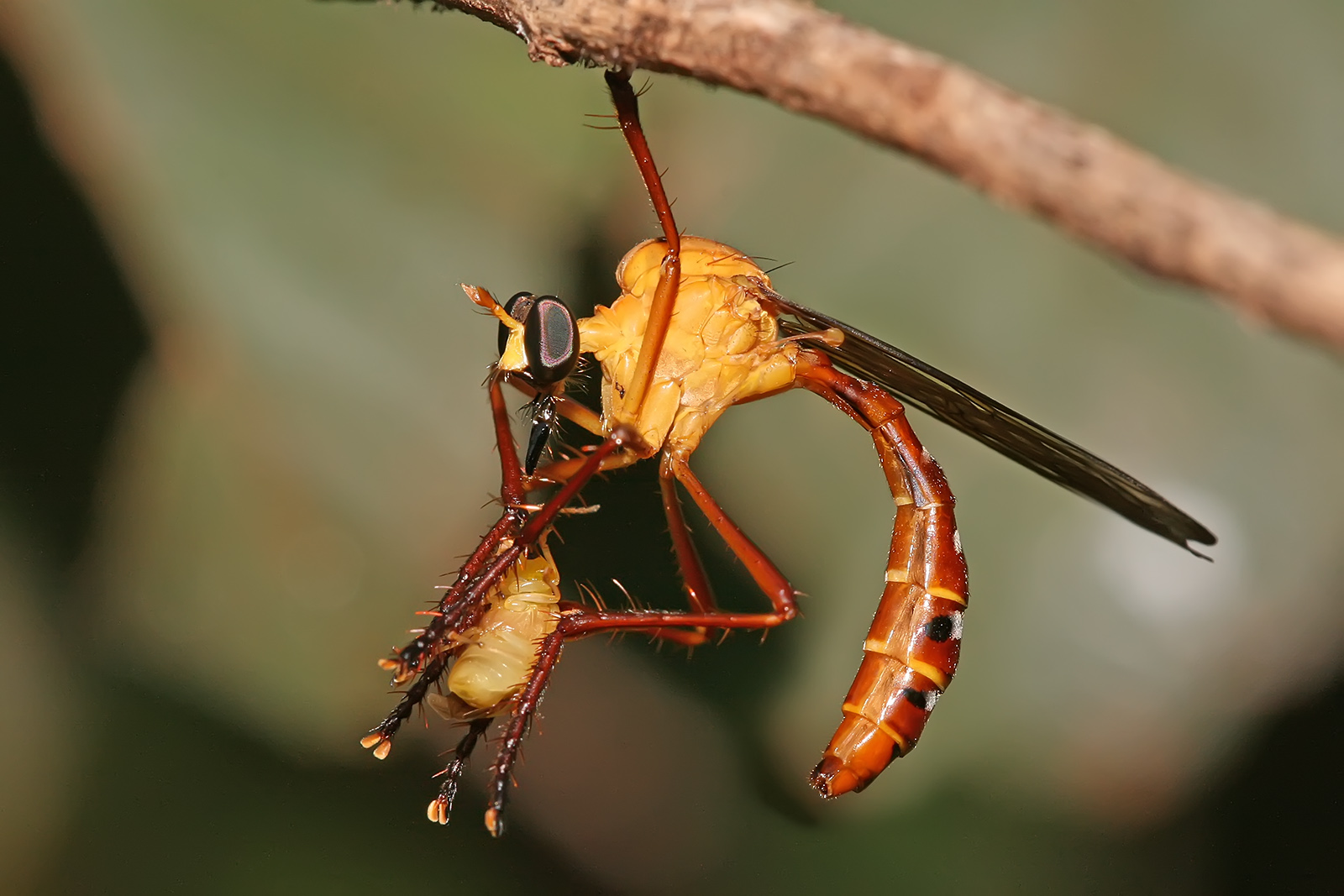
- Pegesimallus sp.
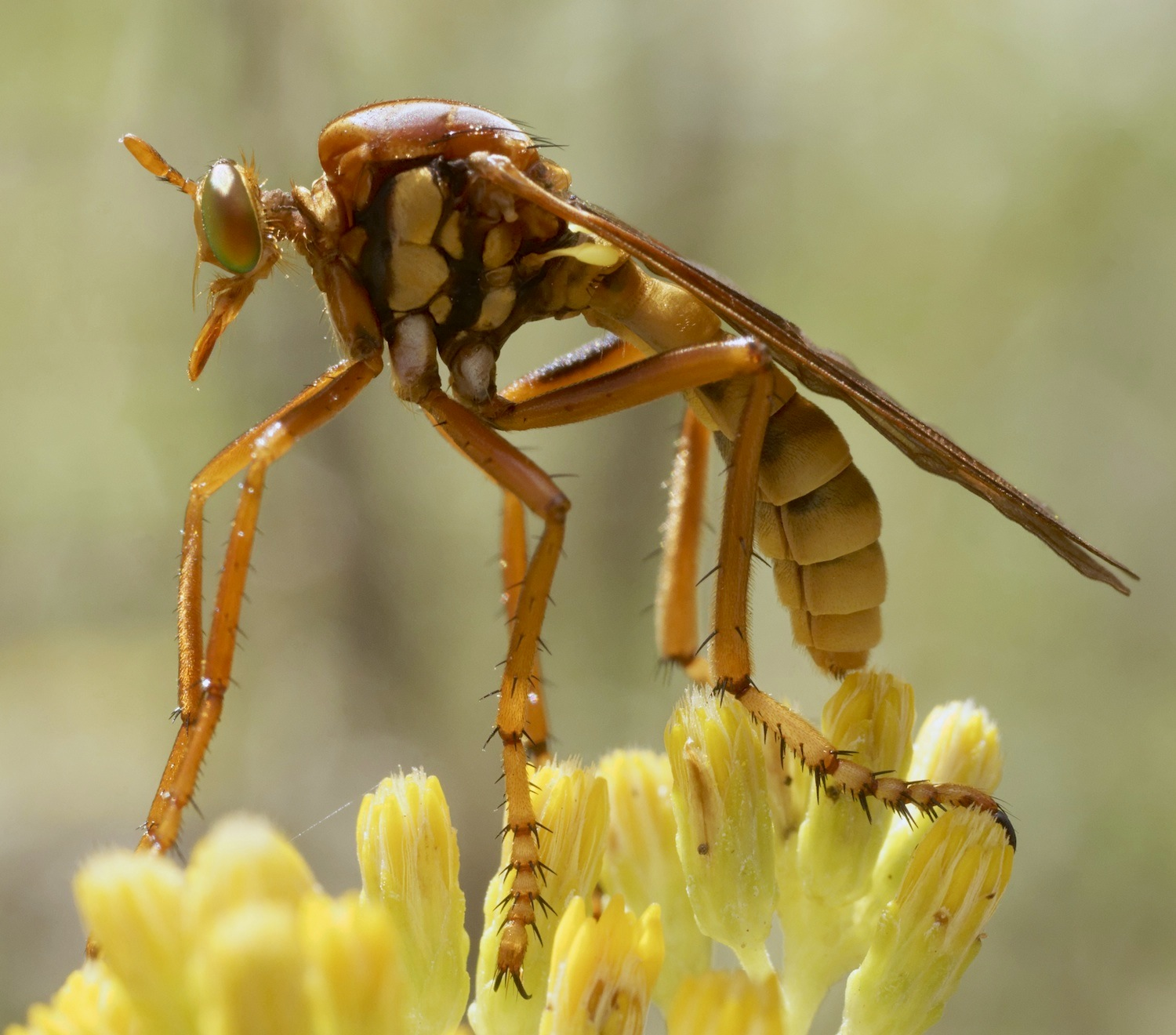
- Blepharepium sonorensis

Scientific classification
- Kingdom: Animalia
- Phylum: Arthropoda
- Clade: Pancrustacea
- Class: Insecta
- Order: Diptera
- Family: Asilidae
- Subfamily: Dasypogoninae; Macquart, 1838

Tribes
- Damalini; Dasypogonini; Dioctriini; Isopogonini; Laphystiini; Stenopogonini; Stichopogonini

= Dasypogoninae =

Subfamily of flies

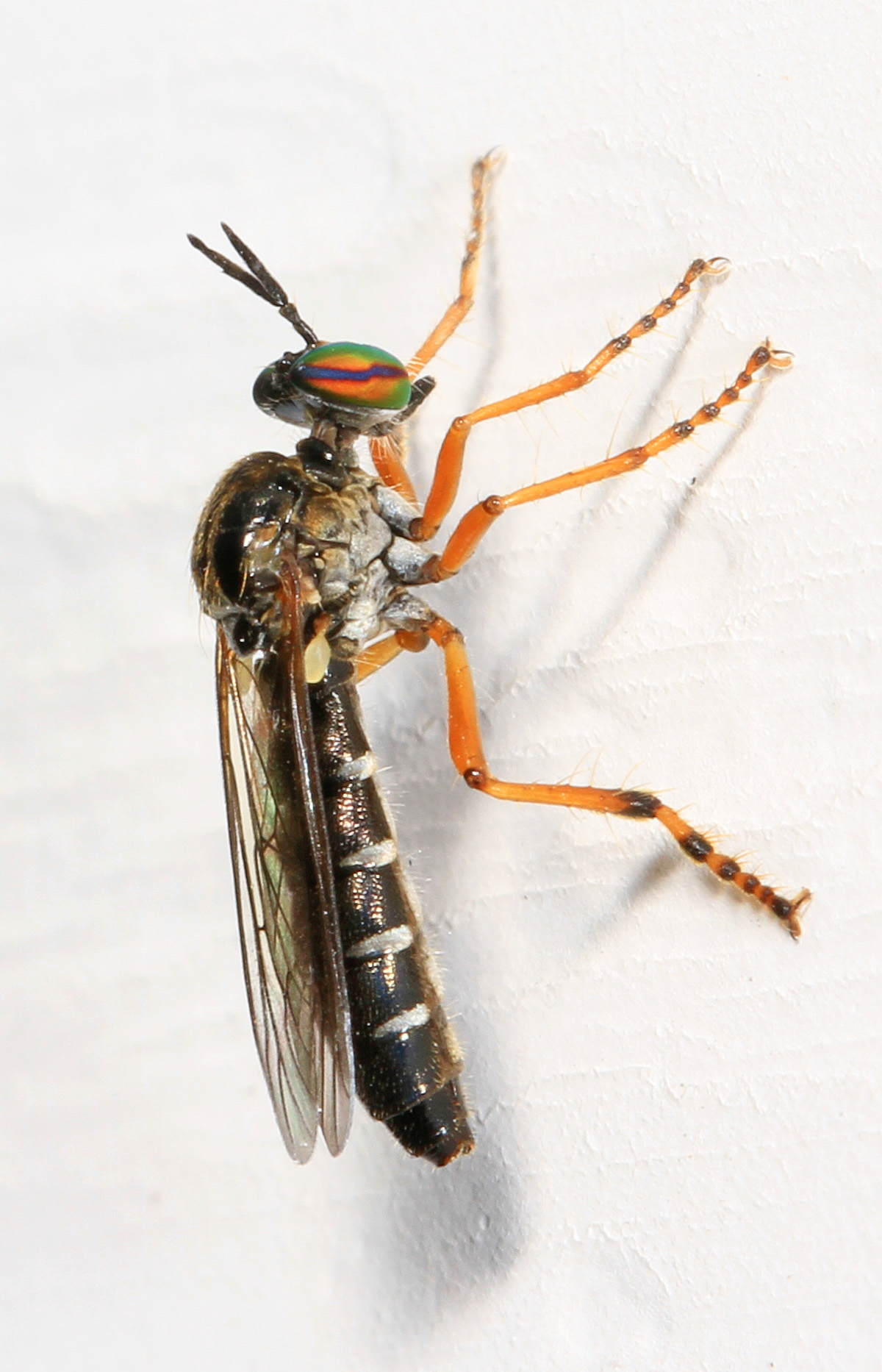
Taracticus octopunctatus.

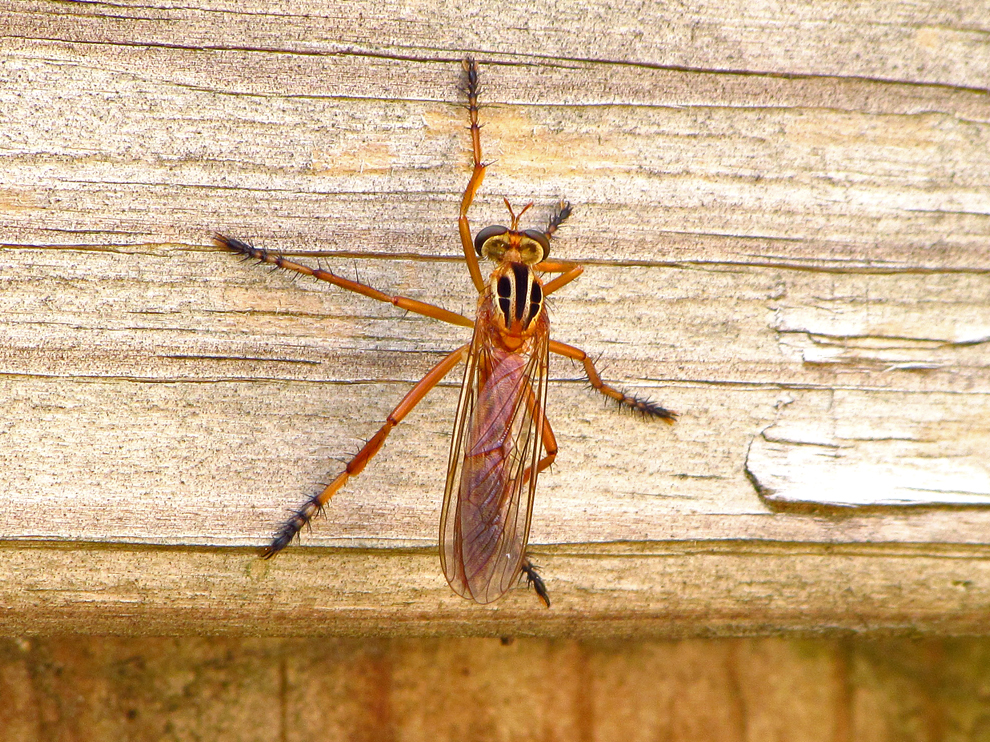
Diogmites neoternatus, a species of hanging thief fly.

Cyrtopogon lateralis with prey.

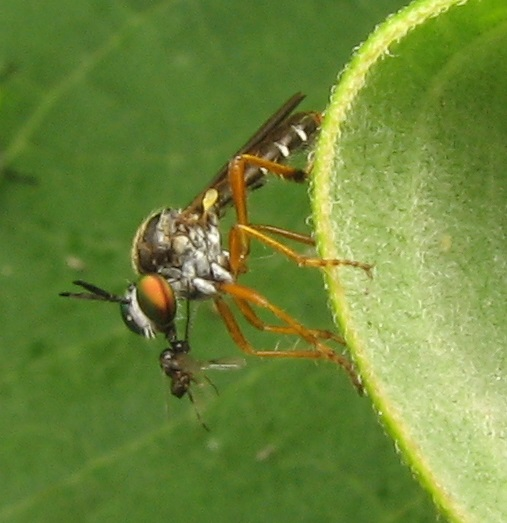
Taracticus octopunctatus on common milkweed.

Dasypogoninae is a subfamily of robber flies in the family Asilidae. There are more than 60 genera and 520 described species in Dasypogoninae.

== Genera ==
These 62 genera belong to the subfamily Dasypogoninae:

- Aczelia Carrera, 1955
- Allopogon Schiner, 1866
- Alvarenga Carrera, 1960
- Amorimius Papavero, 2009
- Annamyia Pritchard, 1941
- Aphamartania Schiner, 1866
- Apolastauroides Artigas and Papavero, 1988
- Apothechyla Hull, 1962
- Araripogon Grimaldi, 1990
- Araucopogon Artigas and Papavero, 1988
- Archilaphria Enderlein, 1914
- Archilestris Loew, 1874
- Aspidopyga Carrera, 1949
- Aterpogon Hardy, 1930
- Austenmyia Carrera, 1955
- Bamwardaria Hradsky, 1983
- Blepharepium Rondani, 1848
- Brevirostrum Londt, 1980
- Caroncoma Londt, 1980
- Chryseutria Hardy, 1928
- Chylophaga Hull, 1962
- Cleptomyia Carrera, 1949
- Comantella Curran, 1923
- Cyrtophrys Loew, 1851
- Dakinomyia Hardy, 1934
- Daptolestes Hull, 1962
- Dasypogon Meigen, 1803
- Deromyia Philippi, 1865
- Diogmites Loew, 1866 (hanging-thieves)
- Erythropogon White, 1914
- Hodophylax James, 1933
- Lastaurina Curran, 1935
- Lastaurus Loew, 1851
- Lestomyia Williston, 1884
- Megapoda Macquart, 1834
- Metalaphria Ricardo, 1912
- Molobratia Hull, 1958
- Neocyrtopogon Ricardo, 1912
- Neoderomyia Artigas, 1971
- Neodiogmites Carrera, 1949
- Neosaropogon Ricardo, 1912
- Omninablautus Pritchard, 1935
- Opseostlengis White, 1914
- Palaeomolobra Hull, 1962
- Paraphamartania Engel, 1930
- Parataracticus Cole, 1924
- Paraterpogon Hull, 1962
- Pegesimallus Loew, 1858
- Phonicocleptes Lynch ArribÃ¡lzaga, 1881
- Pronomopsis Hermann, 1912
- Pseudorus Walker, 1851
- Questopogon Dakin and Fordham, 1922
- Rachiopogon Ricardo, 1912
- Saropogon Loew, 1847
- Senobasis Macquart, 1838
- Stizochymus Hull, 1962
- Taracticus Loew, 1872
- Thereutria Loew, 1851
- Theromyia Williston, 1891
- Theurgus Richter, 1966
- Tocantinia Carrera, 1955
- †Stenocinclis Scudder, 1878
