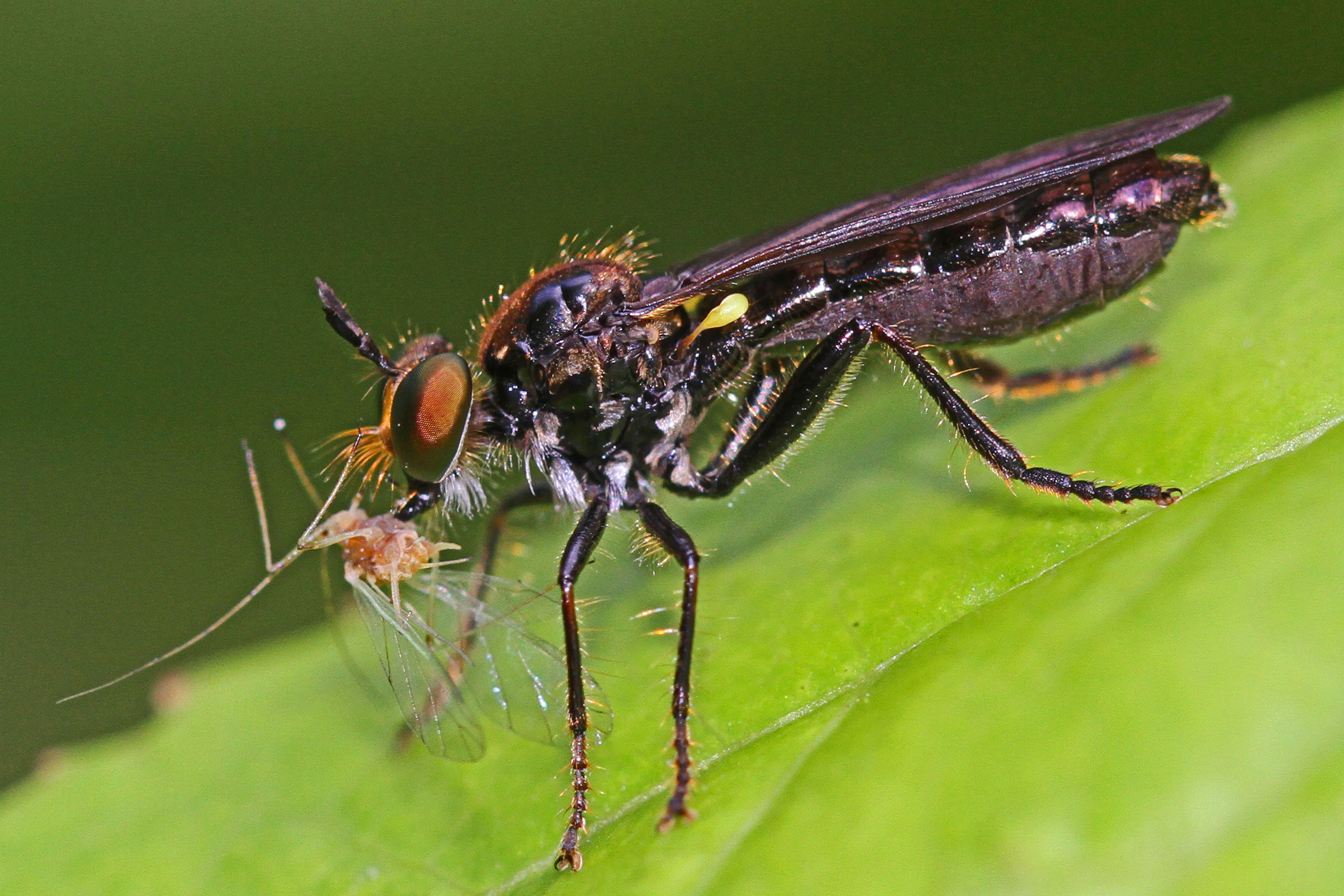
- Eudioctria albius

Scientific classification
- Domain: Eukaryota
- Kingdom: Animalia
- Phylum: Arthropoda
- Class: Insecta
- Order: Diptera
- Family: Asilidae
- Subfamily: Dasypogoninae
- Tribe: Dioctriini
- Genus: Eudioctria; Wilcox & Martin, 1941

= Eudioctria =

Genus of flies

Eudioctria is a genus of robber flies in the family Asilidae. There are about 14 described species in the genus Eudioctria.

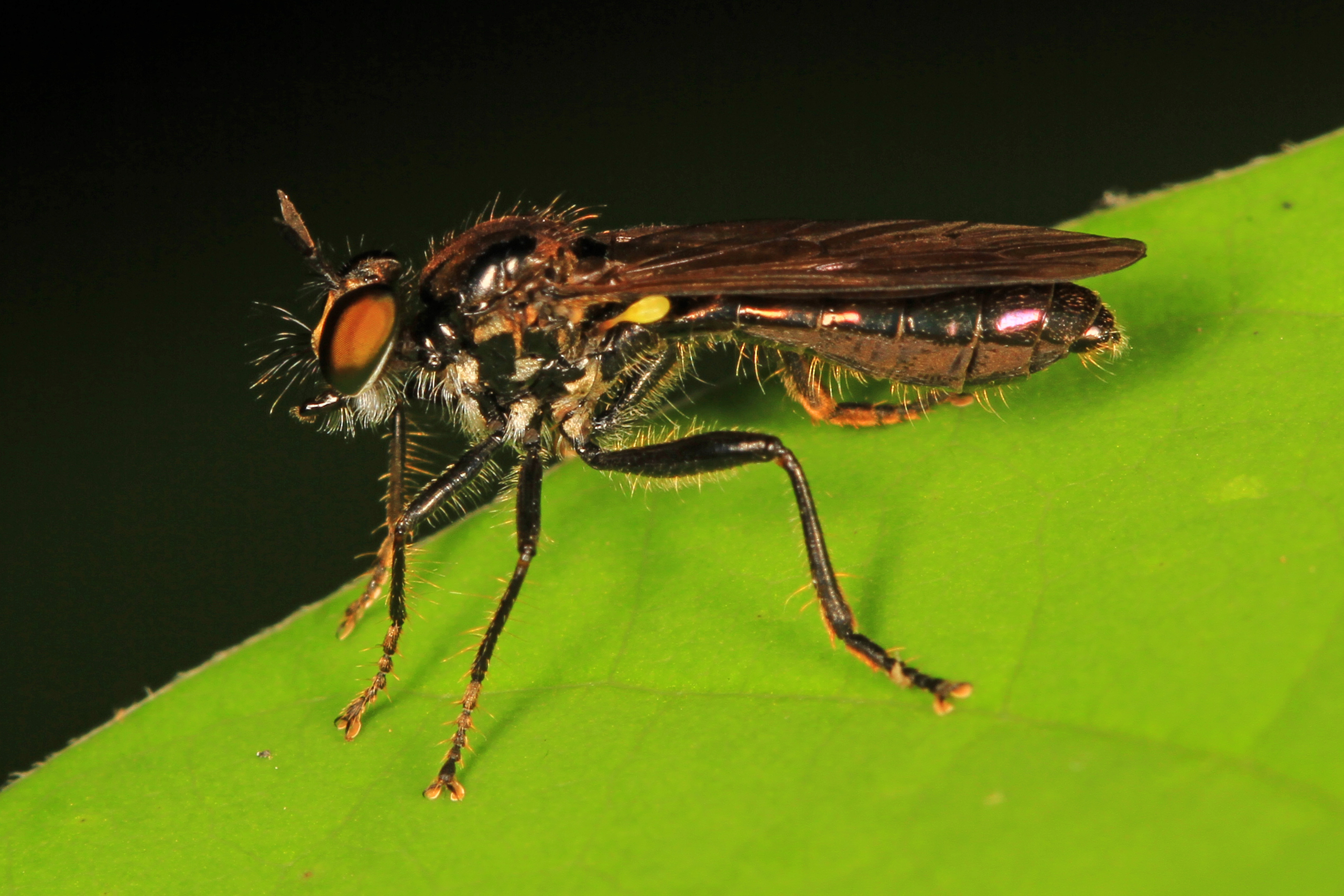
Eudioctria albius

== Species ==
These 14 species belong to the genus Eudioctria:

- Eudioctria albius (Walker, 1849)
- Eudioctria beameri (Wilcox and Martin, 1941)
- Eudioctria brevis (Banks, 1917)
- Eudioctria denuda (Wilcox and Martin, 1941)
- Eudioctria disjuncta Adisoemarto and Wood, 1975
- Eudioctria dissimilis Adisoemarto and Wood, 1975
- Eudioctria doanei (Melander, 1924)
- Eudioctria media (Banks, 1917)
- Eudioctria monrovia (Wilcox and Martin, 1941)
- Eudioctria nitida (Williston, 1883)
- Eudioctria propinqua (Bromley, 1924)
- Eudioctria sackeni (Williston, 1883)
- Eudioctria tibialis (Banks, 1917)
- Eudioctria unica Adisoemarto and Wood, 1975
