= Hodophylax aridus =

Scientific classification
- Domain: Eukaryota
- Kingdom: Animalia
- Phylum: Arthropoda
- Class: Insecta
- Order: Diptera
- Family: Asilidae
- Genus: Hodophylax
- Species: H. aridus

Binomial name
- Hodophylax aridus James, 1933

Synonyms
- Ablautus mcgregori Bromley, 1934

Species of fly

Hodophylax aridus is a species of robber flies in the family Asilidae.
