= Omninablautus =

Scientific classification
- Kingdom: Animalia
- Phylum: Arthropoda
- Class: Insecta
- Order: Diptera
- Family: Asilidae
- Subfamily: Dasypogoninae
- Genus: Omninablautus; Pritchard, 1935

Synonyms
- Omniablautus Martin & Wilcox, 1965

Genus of flies

Omninablautus is a genus of robber flies in the family Asilidae.

== Species ==
- Omninablautus arenosus Pritchard, 1935
- Omninablautus nigronotum (Wilcox, 1935)
- Omninablautus tolandi (Wilcox, 1966)
