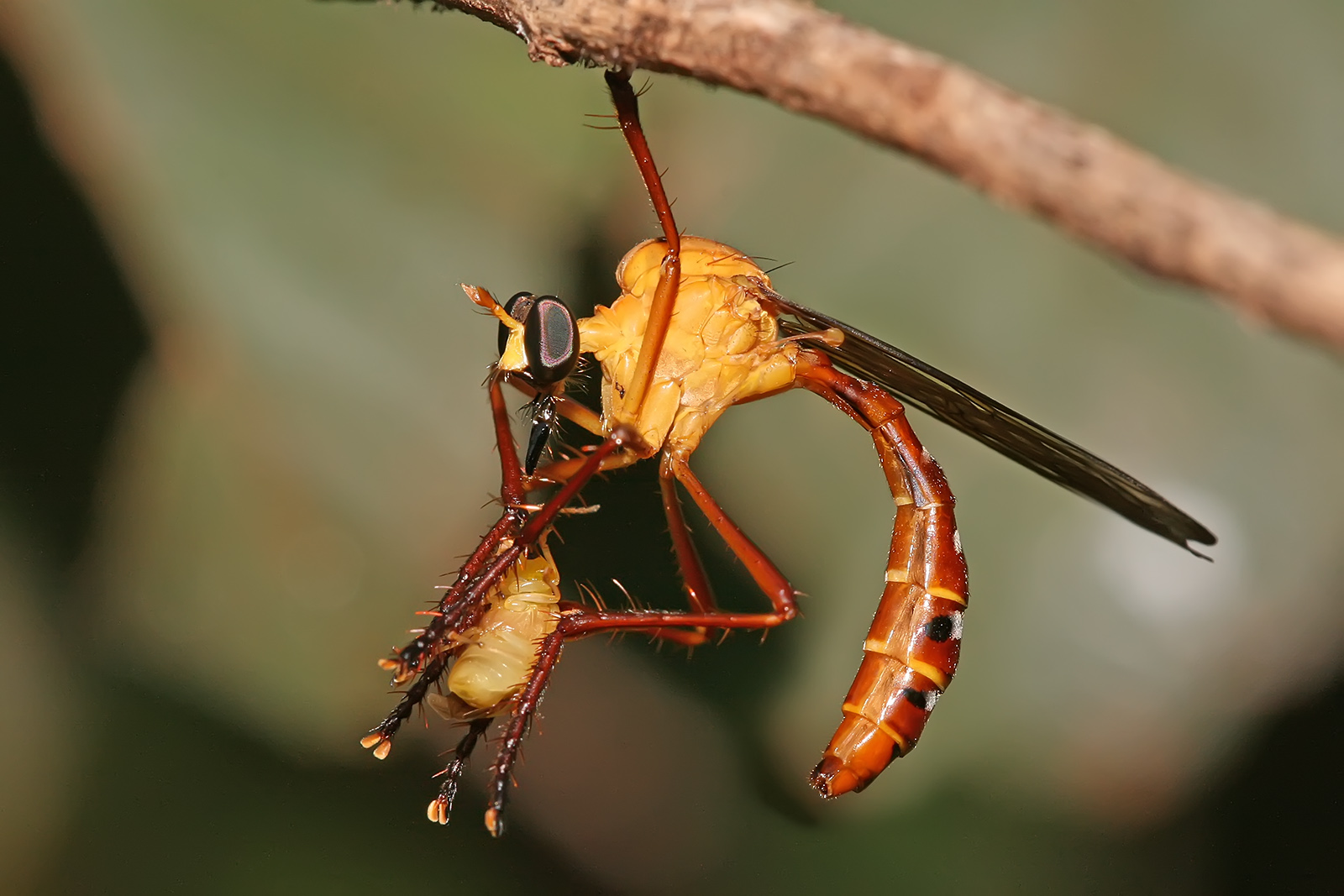
- Pegesimallus sp.

Scientific classification
- Kingdom: Animalia
- Phylum: Arthropoda
- Class: Insecta
- Order: Diptera
- Family: Asilidae
- Subfamily: Dasypogoninae
- Genus: Pegesimallus; Loew, 1857

Species
- See text

= Pegesimallus =

Genus of flies

Pegesimallus is a genus of robber flies.

== Distribution ==
Africa and Eurasia.

== Biology ==
These species spend much of their time perched in the shade on shrubs or grass, where they lie in wait for flying insects. Their prey includes a wide variety of arthropods; Hymenoptera and Diptera predominate. Females oviposit in the surface layer of the soil.

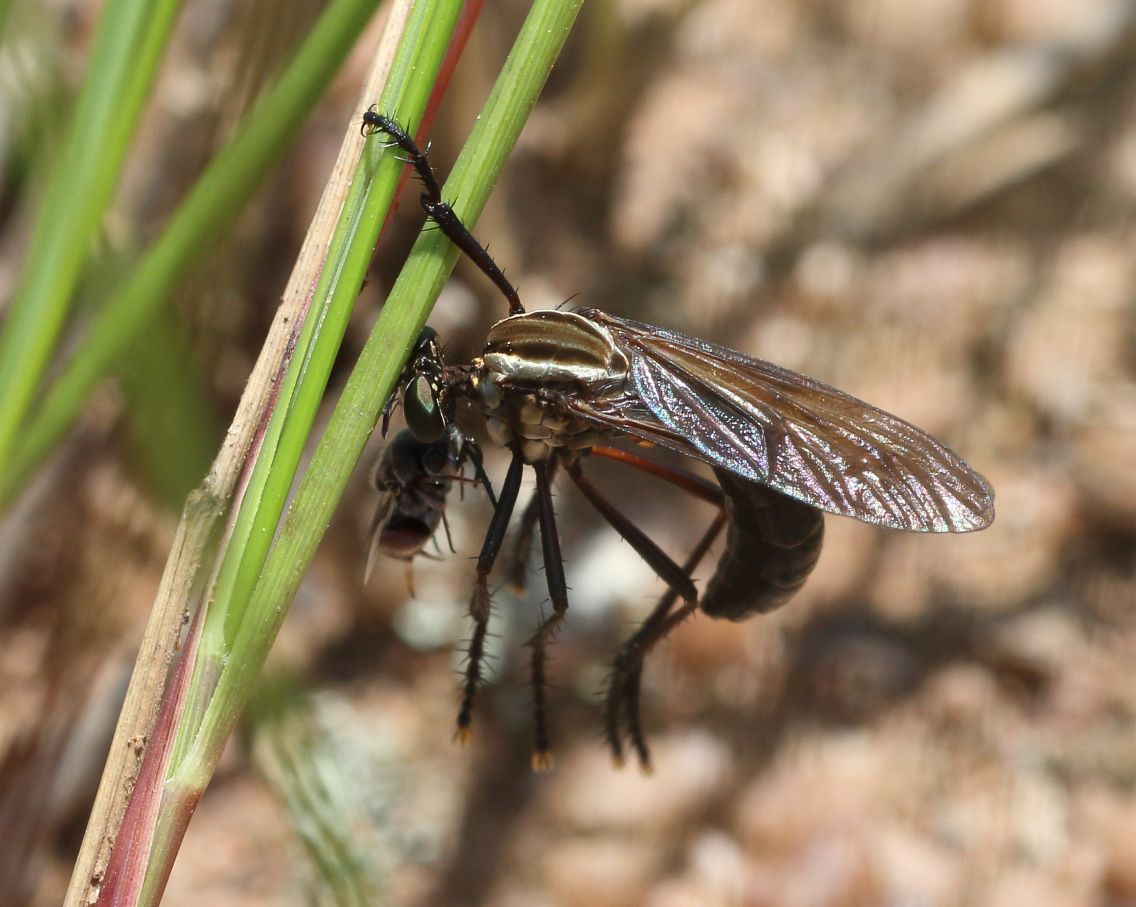
Female with fly prey

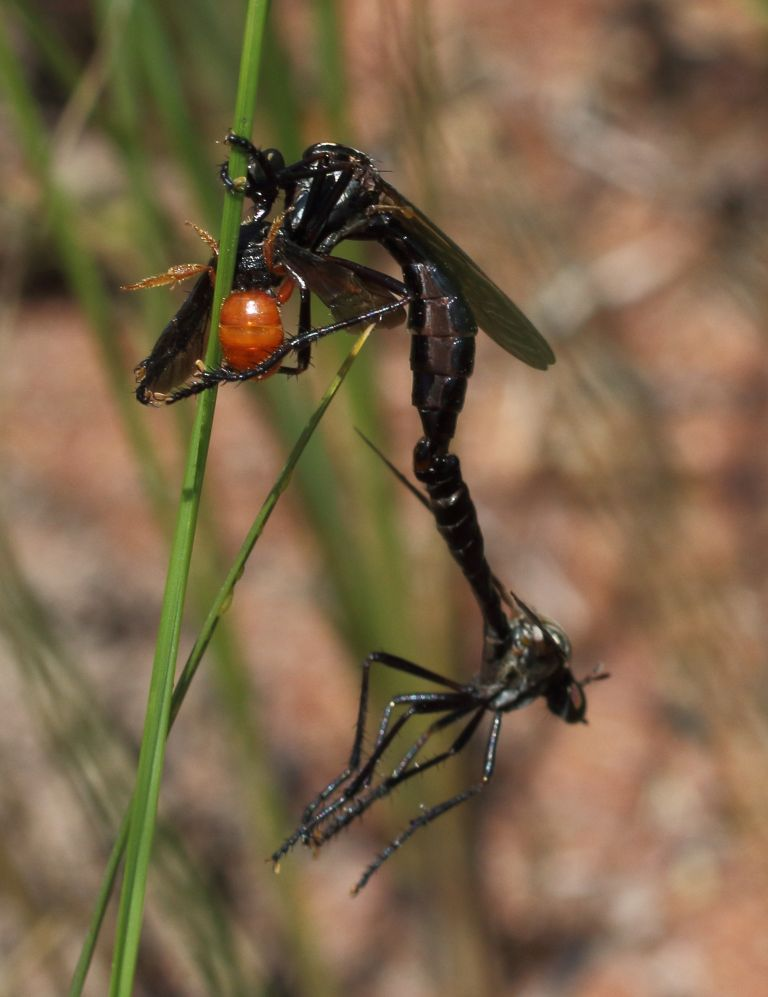
Mating pair; female with wasp prey

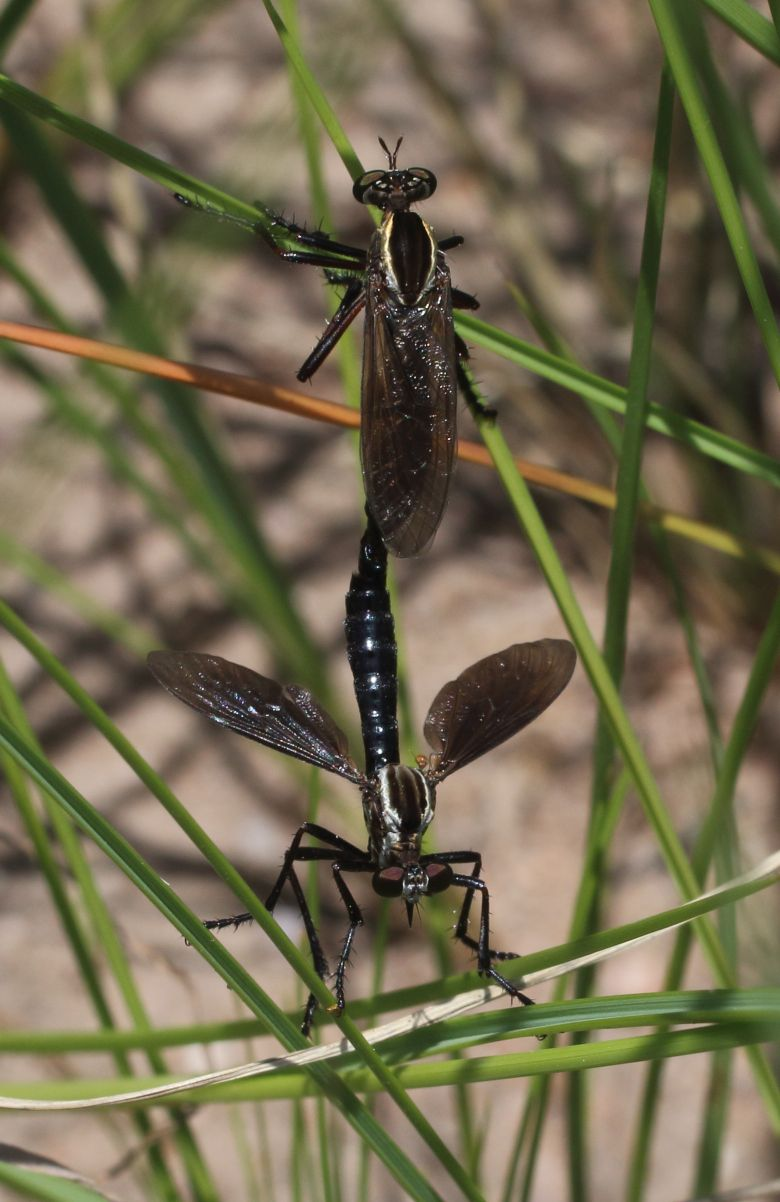
Mating pair

== Taxonomy ==
The classification of the species in this genus is difficult for two main reasons: Firstly, many are sexually dimorphic to the extent that females and males of the same species were, for some time, placed in different genera; and secondly, some of the species are so similar that they can only be separated by considering details of the male genitalia.

The genus has been placed in the tribe Megapodini of the subfamily Dasypogoninae. It contains about 54 species, including the following:

- Pegesimallus apicalis Bromley, 1947
- Pegesimallus brunneus Londt, 1980
- Pegesimallus bulbifrons Londt, 1980
- Pegesimallus calvifrons Londt, 1980
- Pegesimallus claelius Walker, 1849
- Pegesimallus fusticulus Londt, 1980
- Pegesimallus hermanni Londt, 1980
- Pegesimallus irwini Londt, 1980
- Pegesimallus isanicus Tomasovic, 2005
- Pegesimallus kenyensis Londt, 1980
- Pegesimallus mesasiatica Lehr, 1958
- Pegesimallus namibiensis Londt, 1980
- Pegesimallus oldroydi Londt, 1980
- Pegesimallus saegeri Oldroyd, 1970
- Pegesimallus srilankensis Londt, 1980
- Pegesimallus vansoni Londt, 1980
- Pegesimallus volcata Walker, 1849
- Pegesimallus yerburyi Londt, 1980
