= Eudioctria nitida =

Scientific classification
- Domain: Eukaryota
- Kingdom: Animalia
- Phylum: Arthropoda
- Class: Insecta
- Order: Diptera
- Family: Asilidae
- Genus: Eudioctria
- Species: E. nitida

Binomial name
- Eudioctria nitida (Williston, 1883)

Synonyms
- Dioctria nitida Williston, 1883

Species of fly

Eudioctria nitida is a species of robber flies in the family Asilidae.
