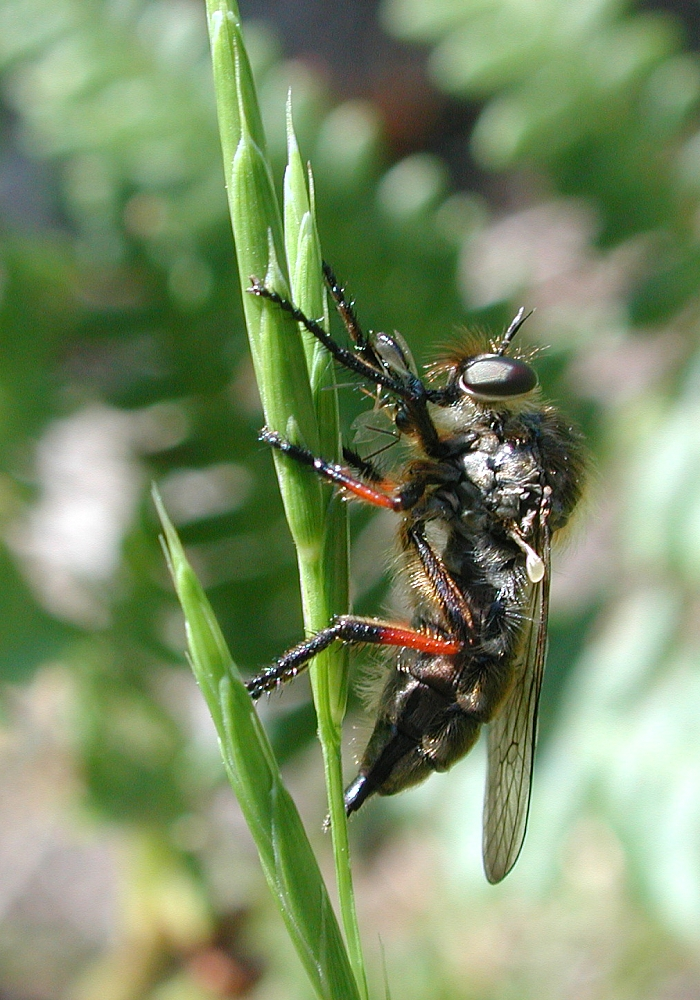
- Leptarthrus brevirostrisGarmisch, Bavaria, Germany

Scientific classification
- Kingdom: Animalia
- Phylum: Arthropoda
- Clade: Pancrustacea
- Class: Insecta
- Order: Diptera
- Family: Asilidae
- Genus: Leptarthrus
- Species: L. brevirostris

Binomial name
- Leptarthrus brevirostris Meigen, 1804

= Leptarthrus brevirostris =

Species of fly

Leptarthrus brevirostris is a Palearctic species of robber fly in the family Asilidae. It is a medium size (body length to 10 mm) greyish over black robberfly with black and red legs and a strongly humped, very hairy thorax. The males have very slender hind tarsi Difficult to distinguish from other Leptarthrus. Wolff, Gebel and Geller-Grimm (2021), ( Majer (1997), van den Broek (1979), Stubbs and Drake (2001) all provide keys, descriptions and illustrations. Older works are also useful eg. Seguy (1920) (Oldroyd (1969)
