= Eudioctria media =

Scientific classification
- Domain: Eukaryota
- Kingdom: Animalia
- Phylum: Arthropoda
- Class: Insecta
- Order: Diptera
- Family: Asilidae
- Genus: Eudioctria
- Species: E. media

Binomial name
- Eudioctria media (Banks, 1917)

Synonyms
- Dioctria media Banks, 1917

Species of fly

Eudioctria media is a species of robber flies in the family Asilidae.
