= Parataracticus =

Scientific classification
- Domain: Eukaryota
- Kingdom: Animalia
- Phylum: Arthropoda
- Class: Insecta
- Order: Diptera
- Family: Asilidae
- Subfamily: Dasypogoninae
- Genus: Parataracticus; Cole, 1924

Genus of flies

Parataracticus is a genus of robber flies (insects in the family Asilidae). There are about seven described species in Parataracticus.

== Species ==
These seven species belong to the genus Parataracticus:

- Parataracticus arenicolus Martin, 1968^{c g}
- Parataracticus cuyamus Wilcox, 1967^{i c g}
- Parataracticus melanderi Wilcox, 1967^{i c g}
- Parataracticus niger Martin, 1955^{i c g}
- Parataracticus rubens (Coquillett, 1904)^{i c g}
- Parataracticus rubidus Cole, 1924^{i c g}
- Parataracticus wyliei Martin, 1955^{i c g b}

Data sources: i = ITIS, c = Catalogue of Life, g = GBIF, b = Bugguide.net
