= Parataracticus wyliei =

Scientific classification
- Domain: Eukaryota
- Kingdom: Animalia
- Phylum: Arthropoda
- Class: Insecta
- Order: Diptera
- Family: Asilidae
- Genus: Parataracticus
- Species: P. wyliei

Binomial name
- Parataracticus wyliei Martin, 1955

Species of fly

Parataracticus wyliei is a species of robber flies (insects in the family Asilidae).
