= Taracticus ruficaudus =

Scientific classification
- Domain: Eukaryota
- Kingdom: Animalia
- Phylum: Arthropoda
- Class: Insecta
- Order: Diptera
- Family: Asilidae
- Genus: Taracticus
- Species: T. ruficaudus

Binomial name
- Taracticus ruficaudus Curran, 1930

Species of fly

Taracticus ruficaudus is a robber fly in the family Asilidae ("robber flies"), in the order Diptera ("flies").
