= Eudioctria brevis =

Scientific classification
- Domain: Eukaryota
- Kingdom: Animalia
- Phylum: Arthropoda
- Class: Insecta
- Order: Diptera
- Family: Asilidae
- Genus: Eudioctria
- Species: E. brevis

Binomial name
- Eudioctria brevis (Banks, 1917)

Synonyms
- Dioctria brevis Banks, 1917

Species of fly

Eudioctria brevis is a species of robber flies in the family Asilidae.
