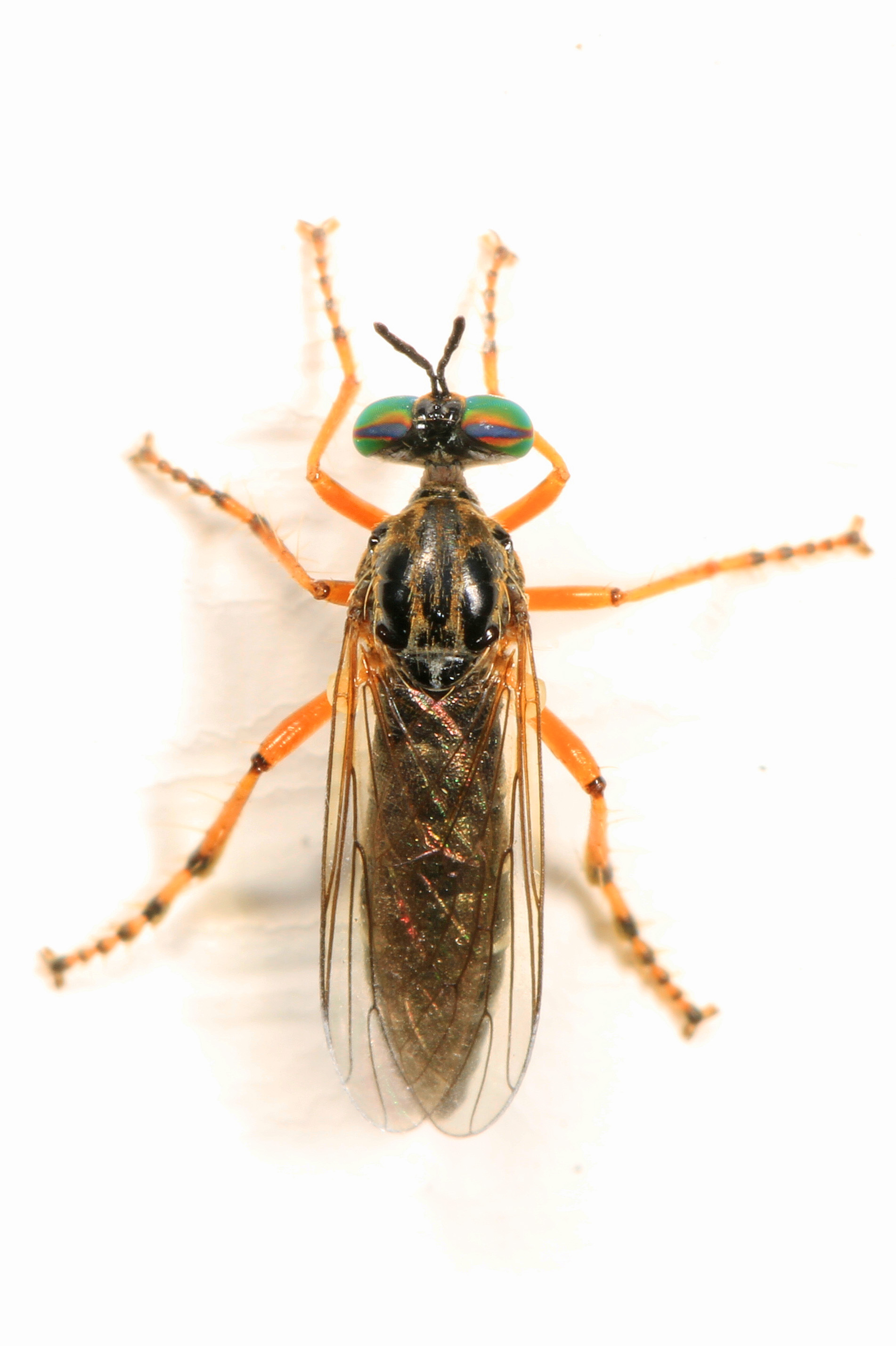
- Taracticus octopunctatus

Scientific classification
- Kingdom: Animalia
- Phylum: Arthropoda
- Class: Insecta
- Order: Diptera
- Family: Asilidae
- Subfamily: Dasypogoninae
- Genus: Taracticus; Loew, 1872

= Taracticus =

Genus of flies

Taracticus is a genus of robber flies in the family Asilidae. There are about 16 described species in Taracticus.

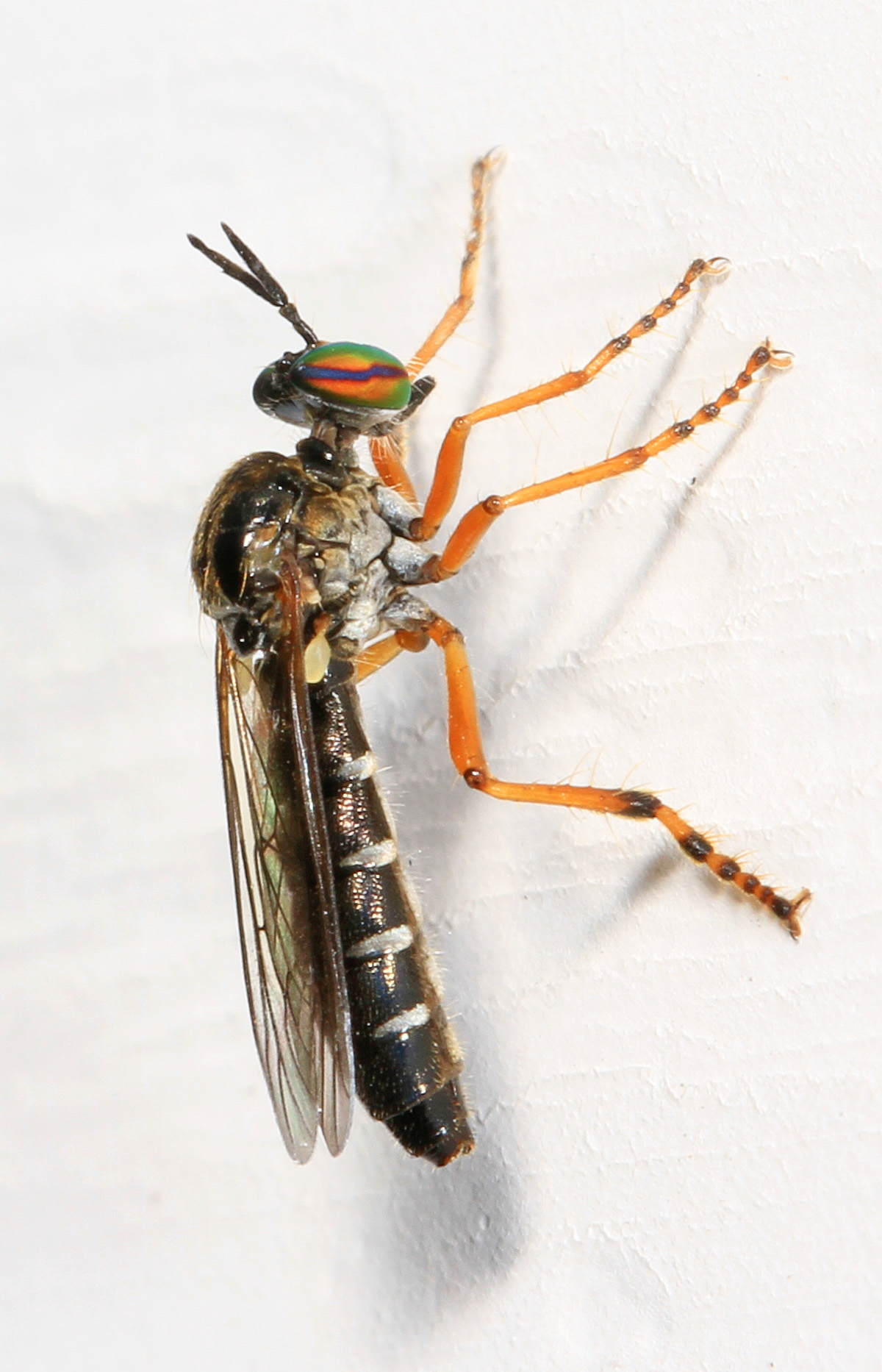
Taracticus octopunctatus

== Species ==
These 16 species belong to the genus Taracticus:

- Taracticus aciculatus Pritchard, 1938
- Taracticus argentifacies James, 1953
- Taracticus dimidiatus (Macquart, 1847)
- Taracticus geniculatus (Bigot, 1878)
- Taracticus guerrerensis Pritchard, 1938
- Taracticus nigrimystaceus Williston, 1901
- Taracticus nigripes Williston, 1901
- Taracticus octopunctatus (Say, 1823)
- Taracticus paulus Pritchard, 1938
- Taracticus ruficaudus Curran, 1930
- Taracticus rufipennis (Macquart, 1847)
- Taracticus similis Williston, 1901
- Taracticus vitripennis (Bellardi, 1861)
- † Psilocephala hypogaea (Cockerell, 1909)
- † Taracticus contusus Cockerell, 1910
- † Taracticus renovatus Cockerell, 1911
