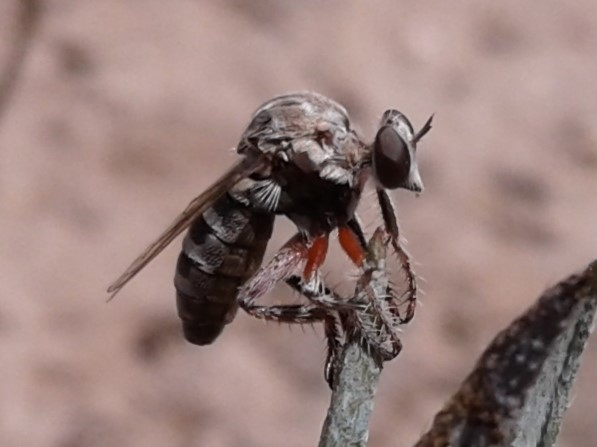

Scientific classification
- Domain: Eukaryota
- Kingdom: Animalia
- Phylum: Arthropoda
- Class: Insecta
- Order: Diptera
- Family: Asilidae
- Subfamily: Dasypogoninae
- Genus: Hodophylax; James, 1933

= Hodophylax =

Genus of flies

Hodophylax is a genus of robber flies in the family Asilidae. There are at least four described species in the genus Hodophylax.

== Species ==
These four species belong to the genus Hodophylax:

- Hodophylax aridus James, 1933^{i c g b}
- Hodophylax basingeri Pritchard, 1938^{i c g}
- Hodophylax halli Wilcox, 1961^{i c g}
- Hodophylax tolandi Wilcox, 1961^{i c g}

Data sources: i = ITIS, c = Catalogue of Life, g = GBIF, b = Bugguide.net
