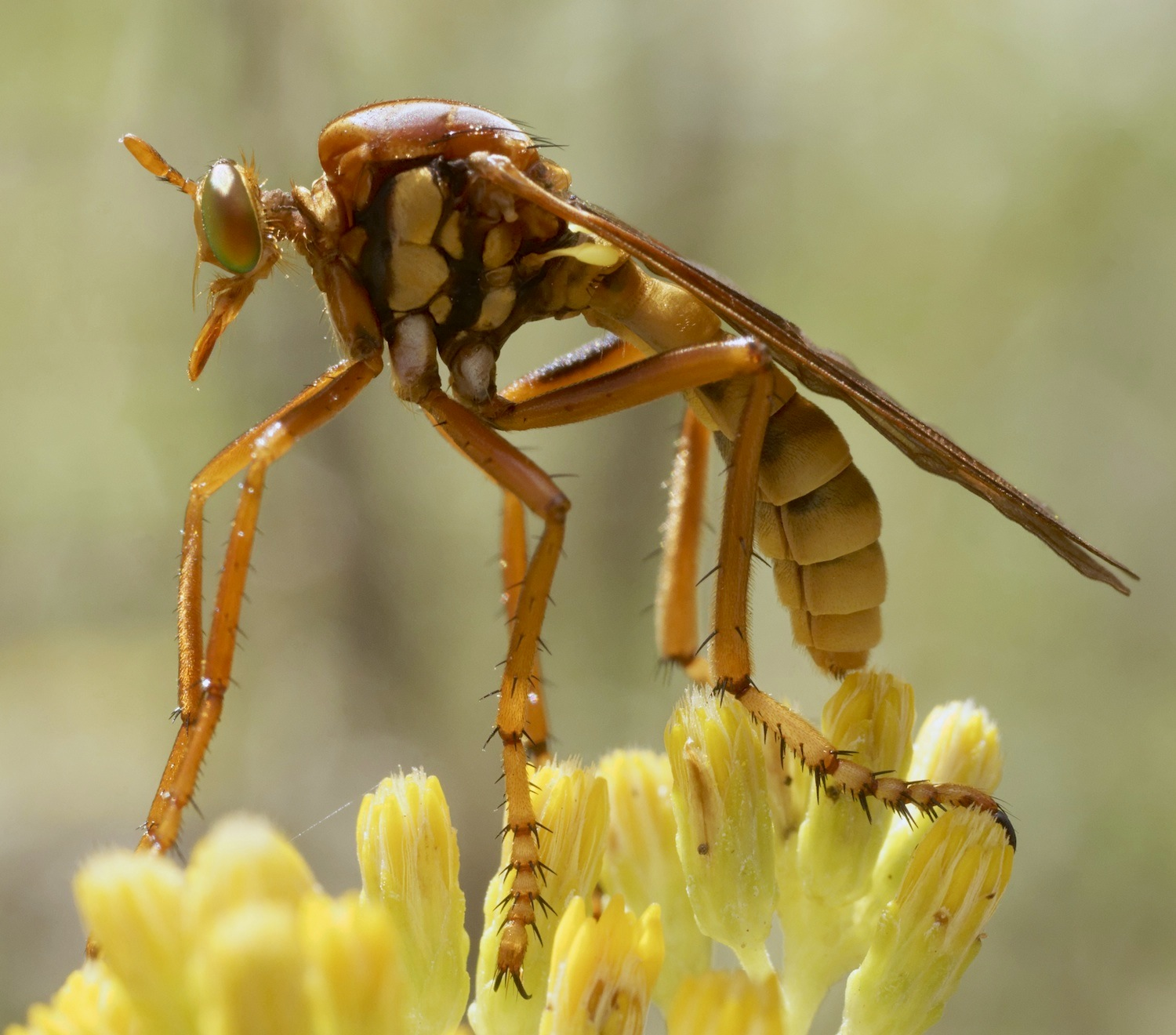
- Blepharepium sonorensis

Scientific classification
- Kingdom: Animalia
- Phylum: Arthropoda
- Clade: Pancrustacea
- Class: Insecta
- Order: Diptera
- Family: Asilidae
- Subfamily: Dasypogoninae
- Genus: Blepharepium; Rondani, 1848

= Blepharepium =

Genus of flies

Blepharepium is a genus of robber flies in the family Asilidae. There are about 15 described species in Blepharepium.

== Species ==
These following species belong to the genus Blepharepium:

- Blepharepium auricinctum (Schiner, 1867)
- Blepharepium cajennense (Fabricius, 1787)
  - Blepharepium cajennense cajennense (Fabricius, 1787)
  - Blepharepium cajennense coarctatum (Perty, 1833)
- Blepharepium cunctabundum Papavero & Bernardi, 1973
- Blepharepium inca Curran, 1942
- Blepharepium luridum Rondani, 1848
- Blepharepium lynchi Carrera, 1949
- Blepharepium maculipennis (Macquart, 1855)
- Blepharepium priapus Papavero and Bernardi, 1973
- Blepharepium secabile (Walker, 1860)
- Blepharepium sonorense Papavero & Bernardi, 1973
- Blepharepium subcontractum (Walker, 1856)
- Blepharepium surumu Papavero & Bernardi, 1973
- Blepharepium vorax Curran, 1942

Data sources: i = ITIS, c = Catalogue of Life, g = GBIF, b = Bugguide.net
