= Omninablautus arenosus =

Scientific classification
- Kingdom: Animalia
- Phylum: Arthropoda
- Class: Insecta
- Order: Diptera
- Family: Asilidae
- Genus: Omninablautus
- Species: O. arenosus

Binomial name
- Omninablautus arenosus Pritchard, 1935

Species of fly

Omninablautus arenosus is a species of robber flies in the family Asilidae.

== Distribution ==
United States.
