= Comantella =

Scientific classification
- Domain: Eukaryota
- Kingdom: Animalia
- Phylum: Arthropoda
- Class: Insecta
- Order: Diptera
- Family: Asilidae
- Subfamily: Dasypogoninae
- Genus: Comantella; Curran, 1923

Genus of flies

Comantella is a genus of robber flies in the family Asilidae. There are at least four described species in Comantella.

== Species ==
These four species belong to the genus Comantella:

- Comantella cristata (Coquillett, 1893)^{i c g}
- Comantella fallei (Back, 1909)^{i c g}
- Comantella pacifica Curran, 1926^{i c g b}
- Comantella rotgeri James, 1937^{i c g}

Data sources: i = ITIS, c = Catalogue of Life, g = GBIF, b = Bugguide.net
