= Eudioctria tibialis =

Scientific classification
- Domain: Eukaryota
- Kingdom: Animalia
- Phylum: Arthropoda
- Class: Insecta
- Order: Diptera
- Family: Asilidae
- Genus: Eudioctria
- Species: E. tibialis

Binomial name
- Eudioctria tibialis (Banks, 1917)

Synonyms
- Dioctria banski Johnson, 1918; Dioctria longicornis Banks, 1917; Dioctria tibialis Banks, 1917

Species of fly

Eudioctria tibialis is a species of robber flies in the family Asilidae.
