= Comantella pacifica =

Scientific classification
- Domain: Eukaryota
- Kingdom: Animalia
- Phylum: Arthropoda
- Class: Insecta
- Order: Diptera
- Family: Asilidae
- Genus: Comantella
- Species: C. pacifica

Binomial name
- Comantella pacifica Curran, 1926

Species of fly

Comantella pacifica is a species of robber flies in the family Asilidae.
