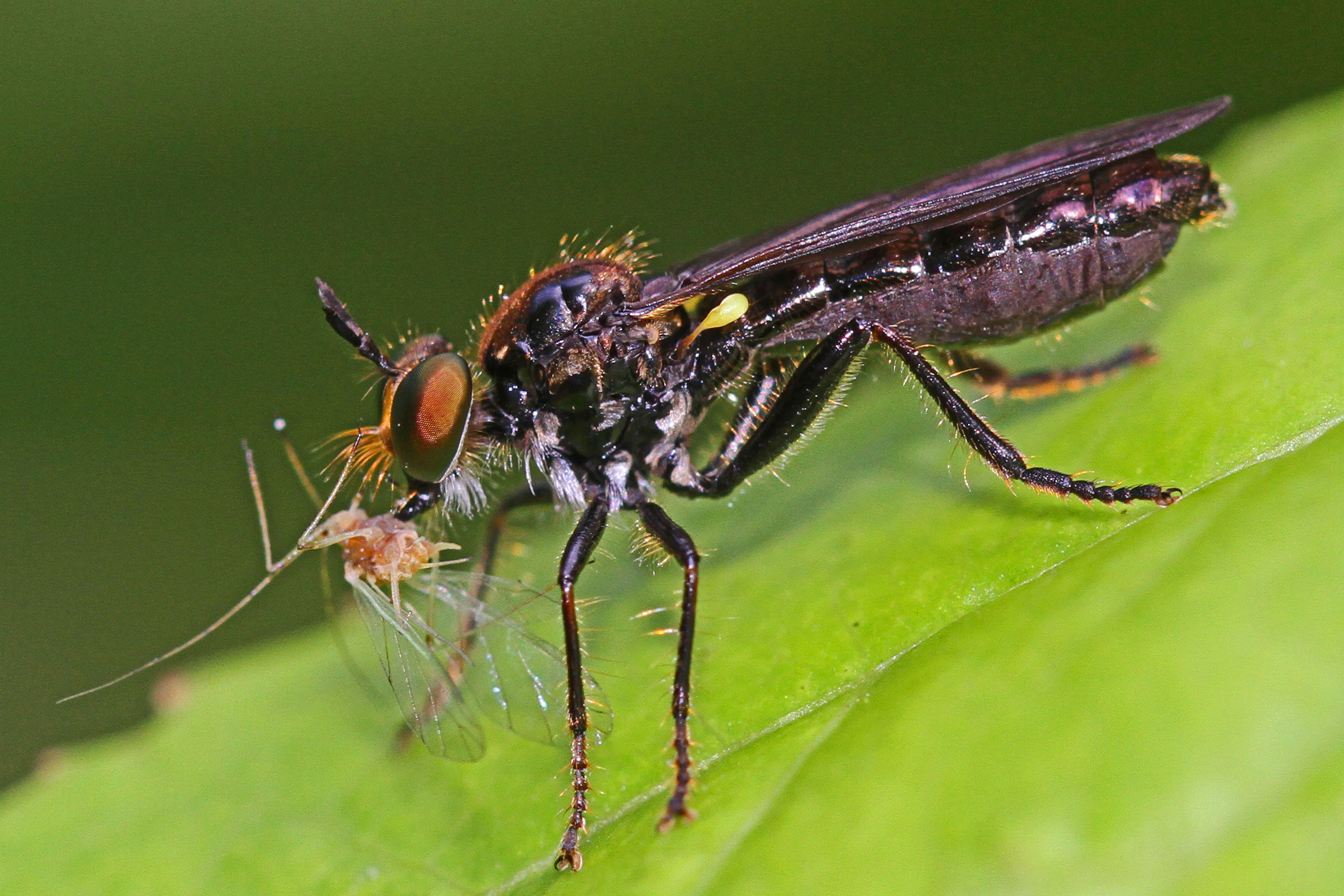

Scientific classification
- Kingdom: Animalia
- Phylum: Arthropoda
- Class: Insecta
- Order: Diptera
- Family: Asilidae
- Genus: Eudioctria
- Species: E. albius

Binomial name
- Eudioctria albius (Walker, 1849)

Synonyms
- Dioctria albius Walker, 1849; Dioctria aurifacies Wilcox and Martin, 1941; Dioctria xanthopennis Wilcox and Martin, 1941

= Eudioctria albius =

Species of fly

Eudioctria albius is a species of robber flies in the family Asilidae.

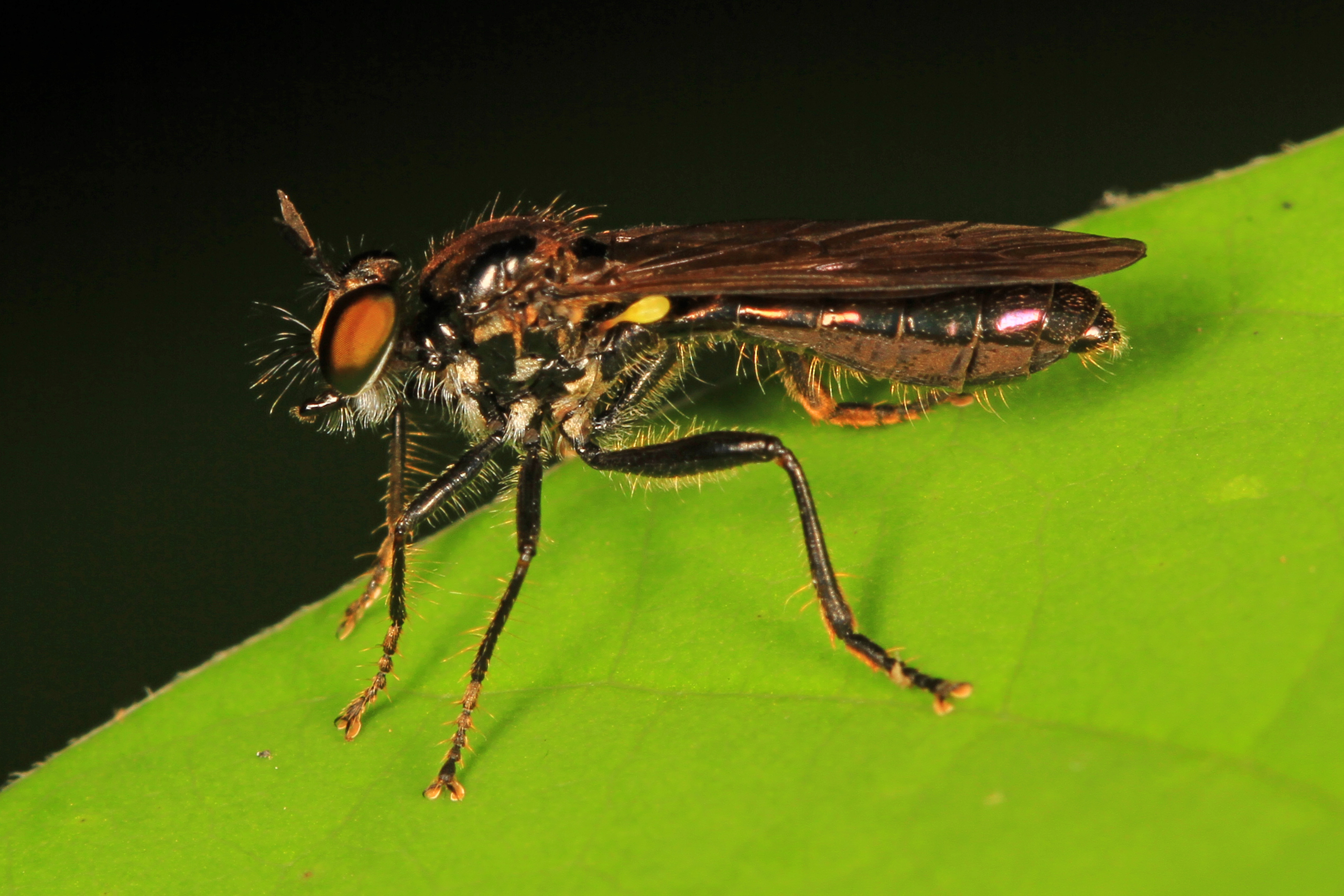
