= Eudioctria propinqua =

Scientific classification
- Domain: Eukaryota
- Kingdom: Animalia
- Phylum: Arthropoda
- Class: Insecta
- Order: Diptera
- Family: Asilidae
- Genus: Eudioctria
- Species: E. propinqua

Binomial name
- Eudioctria propinqua (Bromley, 1924)

Synonyms
- Dioctria propinqua Bromley, 1924

Species of fly

Eudioctria propinqua is a species of robber flies in the family Asilidae.
