= Allopogon =

Scientific classification
- Domain: Eukaryota
- Kingdom: Animalia
- Phylum: Arthropoda
- Class: Insecta
- Order: Diptera
- Family: Asilidae
- Subfamily: Dasypogoninae
- Genus: Allopogon; Schiner, 1886

Type species
- Dasypogon vittatus Wiedemann, 1828

Synonyms
- Caenarolia Thomson, 1869

Genus of flies

Allopogon is a genus of flies belonging to the family Asilidae.

== Species ==
- Allopogon anomalus (Carrera, 1947)
- Allopogon argyrocinctus (Schiner, 1867)
- Allopogon basalis Curran, 1935
- Allopogon castigans (Walker, 1851)
- Allopogon equestris (Wiedemann, 1828)
- Allopogon miles (Wiedemann, 1828)
- Allopogon necans (Wiedemann, 1828)
- Allopogon placidus (Wulp, 1882)
- Allopogon tesselatus (Wiedemann, 1828)
- Allopogon vittatus (Wiedemann, 1828)
