= Alvarenga (fly) =

Scientific classification
- Domain: Eukaryota
- Kingdom: Animalia
- Phylum: Arthropoda
- Class: Insecta
- Order: Diptera
- Family: Asilidae
- Subfamily: Dasypogoninae
- Genus: Alvarenga

Genus of robber flies in the family Asilidae

Alvarenga is a genus of robber flies in the family Asilidae. There are at least two described species in Alvarenga.

== Species ==
These two species belong to the genus Alvarenga:

- Alvarenga icarius Carrera, 1960^{c g}
- Alvarenga matilei Papavero, 1971^{c g}

Data sources: i = ITIS, c = Catalogue of Life, g = GBIF, b = Bugguide.net
