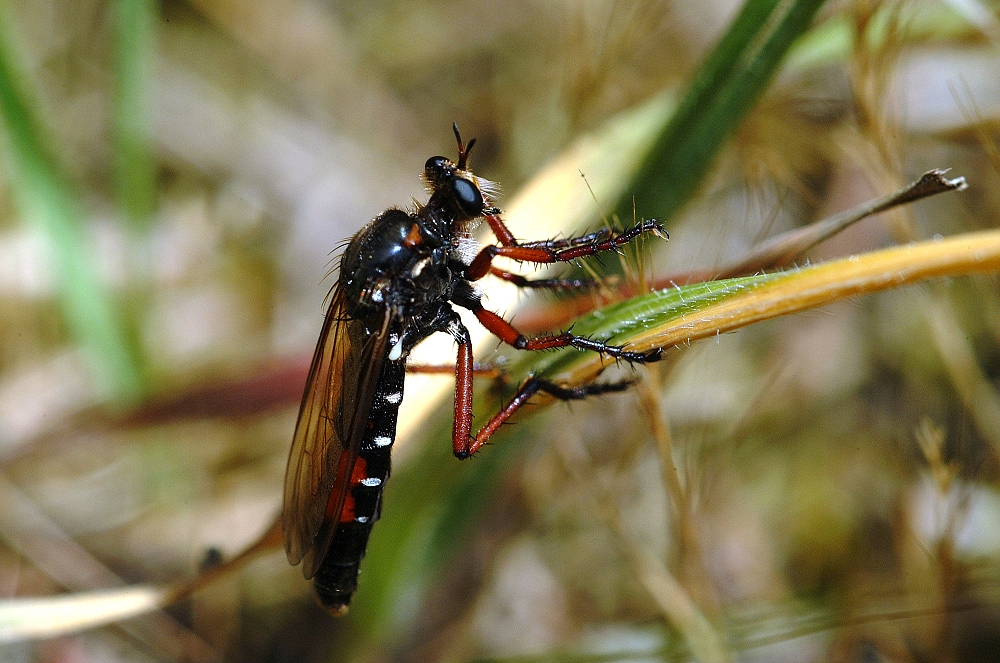
- Asilidae Dasypogon diadema

Scientific classification
- Domain: Eukaryota
- Kingdom: Animalia
- Phylum: Arthropoda
- Class: Insecta
- Order: Diptera
- Family: Asilidae
- Tribe: Dasypogonini
- Genus: Dasypogon; Meigen, 1803

= Dasypogon (fly) =

Genus of insects

Dasypogon is a genus of robber flies in the family Asilidae. There are at least 80 described species in Dasypogon.

== Species ==
These 84 species belong to the genus Dasypogon:

- Dasypogon acratus Walker, 1849^{c g}
- Dasypogon aegon Walker, 1848^{c g}
- Dasypogon aequalis (Walker, 1857)^{c}
- Dasypogon agathyllus Walker, 1848^{c g}
- Dasypogon analis Macquart, 1850^{c g}
- Dasypogon anemetus Walker, 1849^{c g}
- Dasypogon aphidas Walker, 1848^{c g}
- Dasypogon aphidnus Walker, 1849^{c g}
- Dasypogon arcuatus (Fabricius, 1794)^{c g}
- Dasypogon atratus (Fabricius, 1794)^{c g}
- Dasypogon atripennis (Macquart, 1834)^{c g}
- Dasypogon atripes Fabricius, 1805^{c g}
- Dasypogon aurarius Wiedemann, 1821^{c g}
- Dasypogon auripilus (Seguy, 1934)^{c g}
- Dasypogon australis Macquart, 1838^{c g}
- Dasypogon bacescui Weinberg, 1979^{c g}
- Dasypogon barrus Walker, 1849^{c g}
- Dasypogon bigoti Bellardi, 1861^{c g}
- Dasypogon bonariensis Macquart, 1838^{c g}
- Dasypogon brevipennis (Meigen, 1838)^{c g}
- Dasypogon caffer (Wiedemann, 1828)^{c g}
- Dasypogon carvilius Walker, 1849^{c g}
- Dasypogon castigans Walker, 1851^{c g}
- Dasypogon caudatus (Fabricius, 1805)^{c g}
- Dasypogon cephicus Say, 1829^{c g}
- Dasypogon cerretanus Walker, 1848^{c g}
- Dasypogon coon Walker, 1849^{c g}
- Dasypogon copreus Walker, 1849^{c g}
- Dasypogon costalis Lynch Arribalzaga, 1880^{c g}
- Dasypogon crassus Macquart, 1849^{c g}
- Dasypogon diadema (Fabricius, 1781)^{c g}
- Dasypogon dorsalis (Wiedemann, 1824)^{c g}
- Dasypogon equestris Wiedemann, 1828^{c g}
- Dasypogon fabricii Wiedemann, 1820^{c g}
- Dasypogon flavipennis Macquart, 1846^{c g}
- Dasypogon fossius (Walker, 1849)^{c g}
- Dasypogon fraternus Macquart, 1846^{c g}
- Dasypogon fuscipennis Macquart, 1834^{c g}
- Dasypogon geradi Weinberg, 1987^{g}
- Dasypogon gerardi Weinberg, 1988^{c g}
- Dasypogon gougeleti (Bigot, 1878)^{c g}
- Dasypogon grandis Macquart, 1846^{c g}
- Dasypogon iberus Tomasovic, 1999^{c g}
- Dasypogon insertus Walker, 1851^{c g}
- Dasypogon irinelae Weinberg, 1986^{c g}
- Dasypogon kugleri Weinberg, 1986^{c g}
- Dasypogon lebasii Macquart, 1838^{c g}
- Dasypogon lenticeps (Thomson, 1869)^{c g}
- Dasypogon longus Macquart, 1838^{c g}
- Dasypogon luctuosus Macquart, 1838^{c g}
- Dasypogon lugens Philippi, 1865^{c g}
- Dasypogon magisi Tomasovic, 1999^{c g}
- Dasypogon maricus Walker, 1849^{c g}
- Dasypogon melanogaster^{g}
- Dasypogon melanopterus Loew, 1869^{c g}
- Dasypogon mexicanus Macquart, 1846^{c g}
- Dasypogon nigriventris Dufour, 1833^{c g}
- Dasypogon occlusus Meijere, 1906^{c g}
- Dasypogon octonotatus Loew, 1869^{c g}
- Dasypogon olcesci (Bigot, 1878)^{c g}
- Dasypogon parvus Rondani, 1851^{c g}
- Dasypogon potitus Walker, 1849^{c g}
- Dasypogon pumilus Macquart, 1838^{c g}
- Dasypogon punctipennis Macquart, 1838^{c g}
- Dasypogon rapax Walker, 1851^{c g}
- Dasypogon regenstreifi Weinberg, 1986^{c g}
- Dasypogon reinhardi Wiedemann, 1824^{c g}
- Dasypogon rubiginipennis Macquart, 1838^{c g}
- Dasypogon rubiginosum (Bigot, 1878)^{c g}
- Dasypogon rubinipes (Becker & Stein, 1913)^{c g}
- Dasypogon rufescens (Macquart, 1834)^{c g}
- Dasypogon ruficauda (Fabricius, 1805)^{c g}
- Dasypogon rufipes Philippi, 1865^{c g}
- Dasypogon rufiventris Walker, 1854^{c g}
- Dasypogon sericeus Philippi, 1865^{c g}
- Dasypogon sicanus Costa, 1854^{c g}
- Dasypogon silanus Walker, 1849^{c g}
- Dasypogon tenuis Macquart, 1838^{c g}
- Dasypogon torridus (Walker, 1856)^{c g}
- Dasypogon tragicus (Wiedemann, 1828)^{c g}
- Dasypogon tripartitus Walker, 1854^{c g}
- Dasypogon tsacasi Weinberg, 1991^{c g}
- Dasypogon variabilis Brullé, 1833^{c g}
- Dasypogon volcatius Walker, 1849^{c g}

Data sources: c = Catalogue of Life, g = GBIF, b = Bugguide.net
