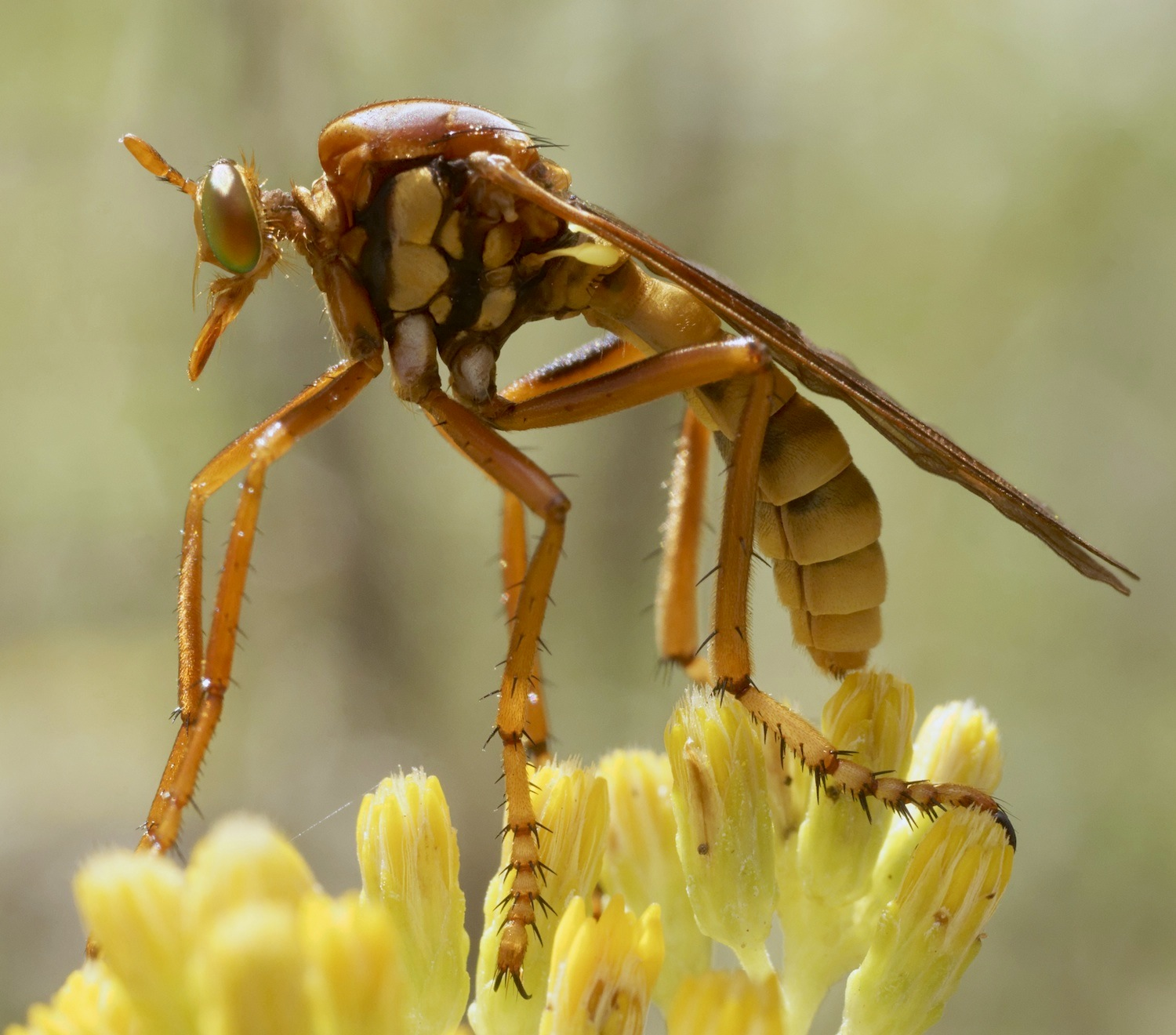

Scientific classification
- Kingdom: Animalia
- Phylum: Arthropoda
- Clade: Pancrustacea
- Class: Insecta
- Order: Diptera
- Family: Asilidae
- Genus: Blepharepium
- Species: B. sonorense

Binomial name
- Blepharepium sonorense Papavero & Bernardi, 1973

Synonyms
- Blepharepium sonorensis Papavero & Bernardi, 1973

= Blepharepium sonorense =

Species of fly

Blepharepium sonorense is a species of robber flies in the family Asilidae. The spelling of the suffix of the species name was originally given as sonorensis in Papavero & Bernardi, 1973 (p. 175) the genus is neuter, therefore per mandatory inflection, it is revised as sonorense.
