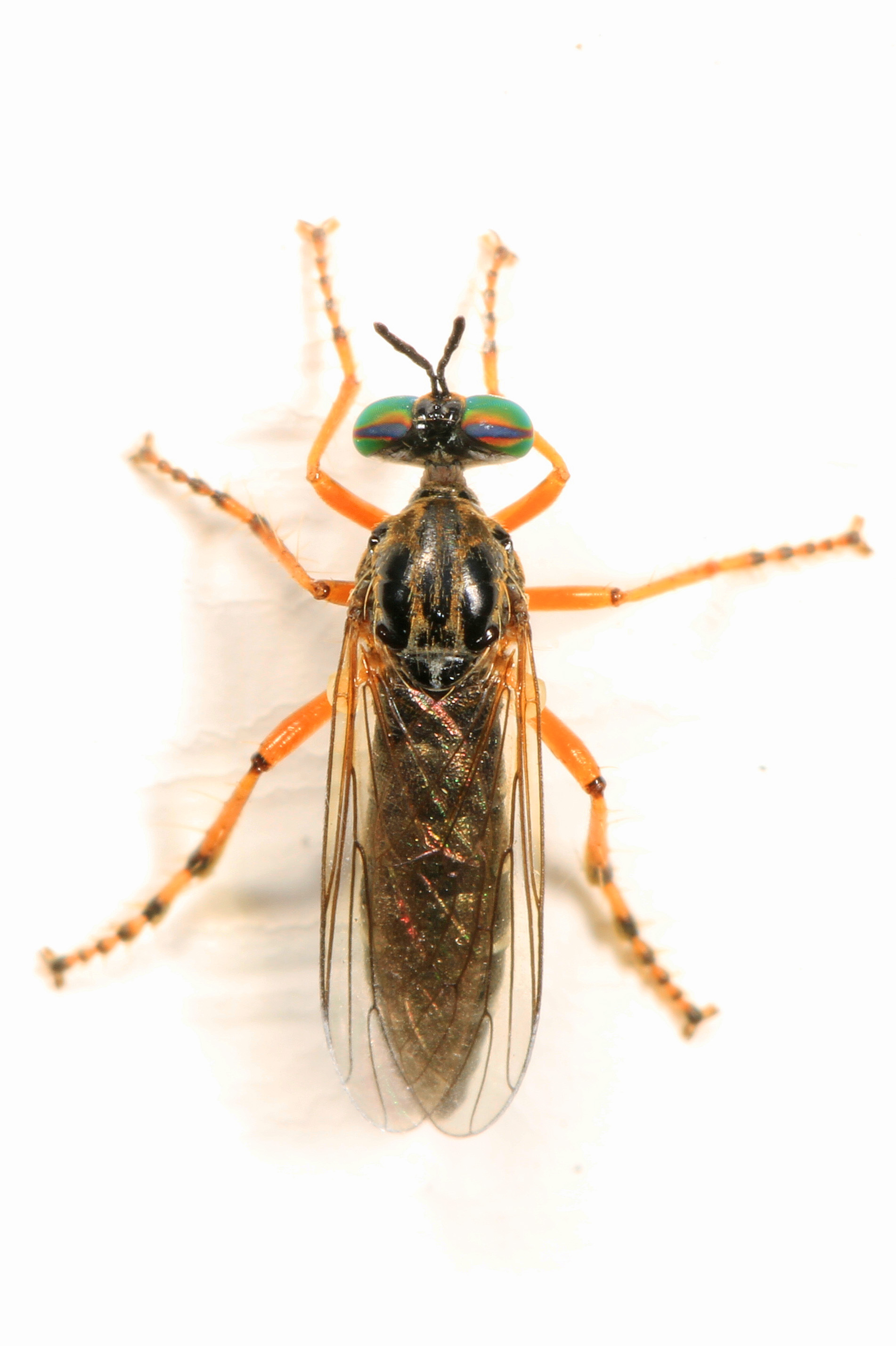

Scientific classification
- Kingdom: Animalia
- Phylum: Arthropoda
- Clade: Pancrustacea
- Class: Insecta
- Order: Diptera
- Family: Asilidae
- Genus: Taracticus
- Species: T. octopunctatus

Binomial name
- Taracticus octopunctatus (Say, 1823)

Synonyms
- Dioctria 8-punctata Say, 1823; Dioctria rufipes Jones, 1907; Dioctrodes flavipes Coquillett, 1904

= Taracticus octopunctatus =

Species of fly

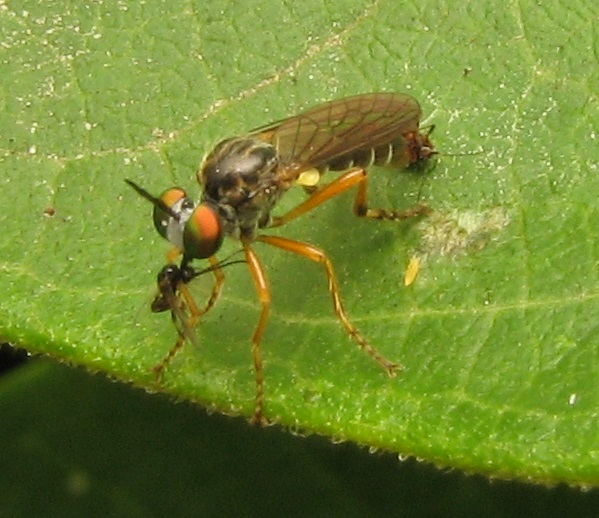
T. octopunctatus and prey

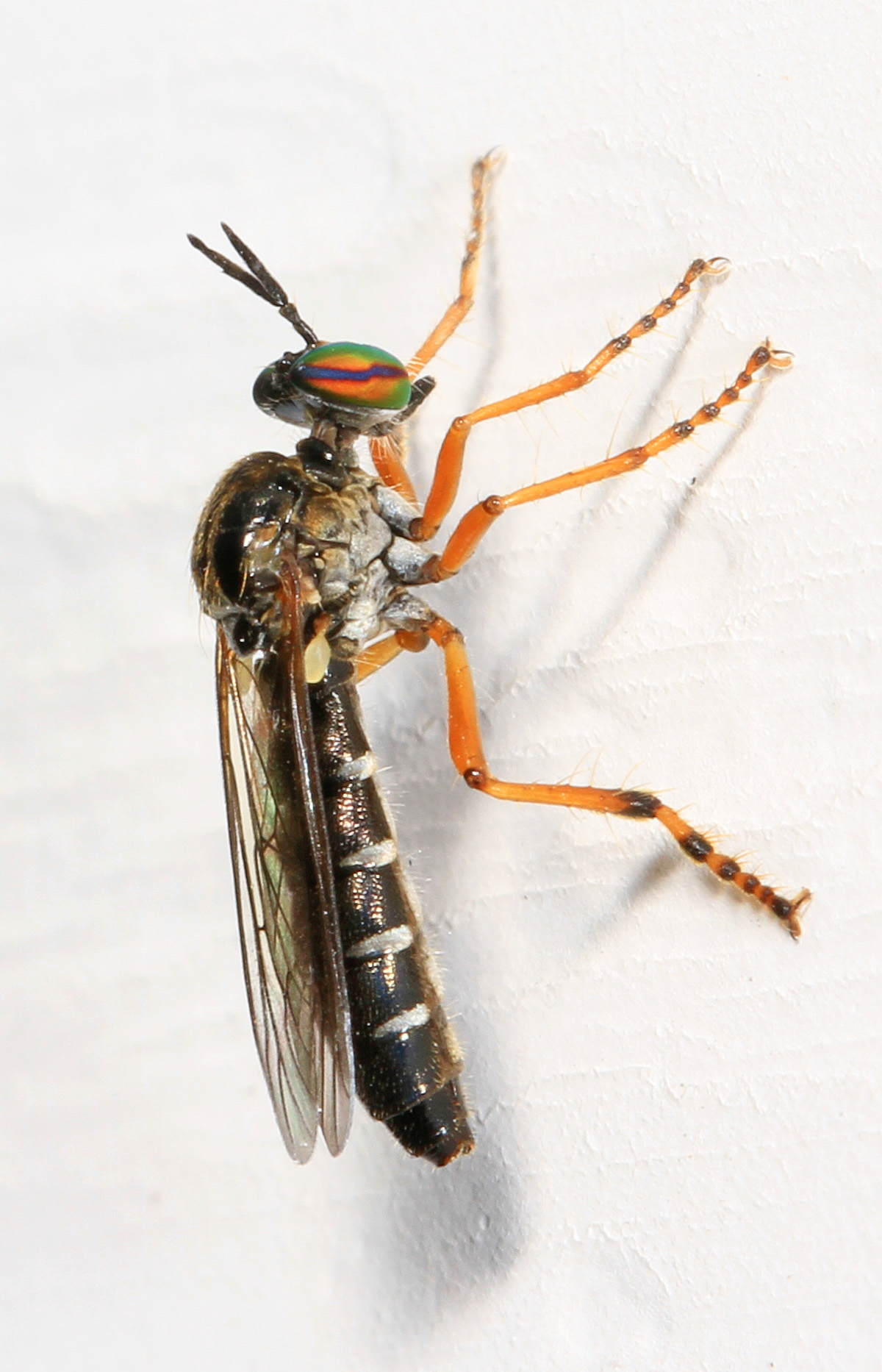
In Woodbridge, Virginia

Taracticus octopunctatus is a species of robber fly in the family Asilidae. It is found in the eastern United States.
