= Zosteria sydneensis =

Scientific classification
- Kingdom: Animalia
- Phylum: Arthropoda
- Class: Insecta
- Order: Diptera
- Family: Asilidae
- Genus: Zosteria
- Species: Z. sydneensis

Binomial name
- Zosteria sydneensis (Macquart, 1838)

Species of robberfly

Zosteria sydneensis is a species of robberfly found in Sydney, Australia.

== Description ==
First described by Macquart in 1838.

== Range ==
Sydney, Australia and nearby.

== Etymology ==
Sydneyeensis refers to Sydney.
