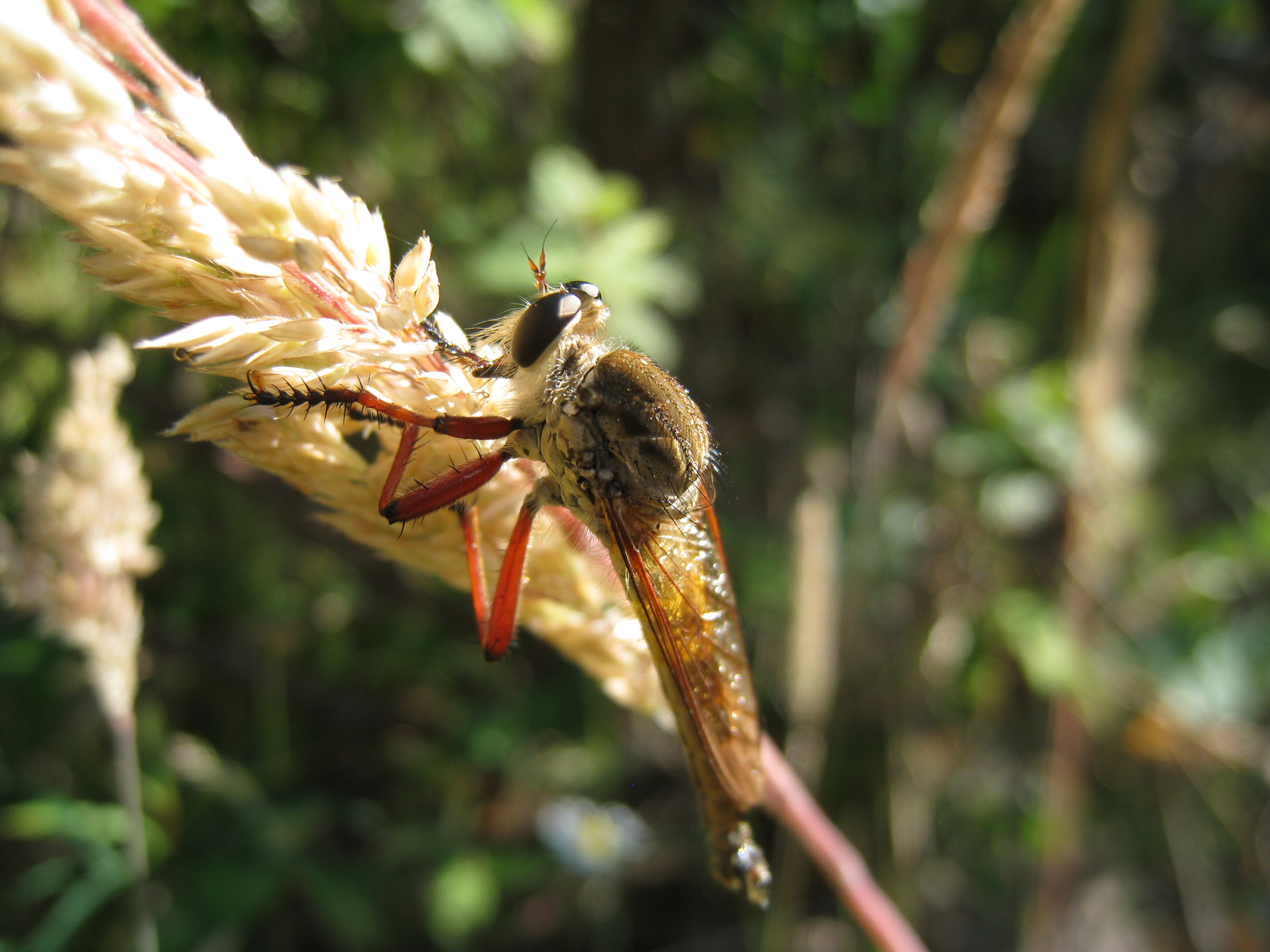

Scientific classification
- Domain: Eukaryota
- Kingdom: Animalia
- Phylum: Arthropoda
- Class: Insecta
- Order: Diptera
- Family: Asilidae
- Genus: Zosteria; Daniels, 1987

= Zosteria =

Genus of insects

Zosteria is a genus of insects in the robber fly family Aslidae.

== Taxonomy ==
The following species are recognised in the genus Zosteria:

- Zosteria affinis Daniels, 1987
- Zosteria alcetas (Walker, 1849)
- Zosteria alpina Daniels, 1987
- Zosteria caesariata Daniels, 1987
- Zosteria calignea Daniels, 1987
- Zosteria claudiana Daniels, 1987
- Zosteria clausum Daniels, 1987
- Zosteria clivosa Daniels, 1987
- Zosteria eastwoodi Daniels, 1987
- Zosteria fulvipubescens (Macquart, 1850)
- Zosteria hispida Daniels, 1987
- Zosteria illingworthi (Hardy, 1922)
- Zosteria lineata Daniels, 1987
- Zosteria longiceps Daniels, 1987
- Zosteria montana Daniels, 1987
- Zosteria murina (Macquart, 1838)
- Zosteria nigrifemorata Daniels, 1987
- Zosteria novazealandica Daniels, 1987
- Zosteria punicea Daniels, 1987
- Zosteria queenslandi Daniels, 1987
- Zosteria rosevillensis (Hardy, 1935)
- Zosteria rubens Daniels, 1987
- Zosteria ruspata Daniels, 1987
- Zosteria suda Daniels, 1987
- Zosteria sydneensis (Macquart, 1838)
- Zosteria varia Daniels, 1987
- Zosteria venator Daniels, 1987
- BOLD:AAU6664 (Zosteria sp.)
