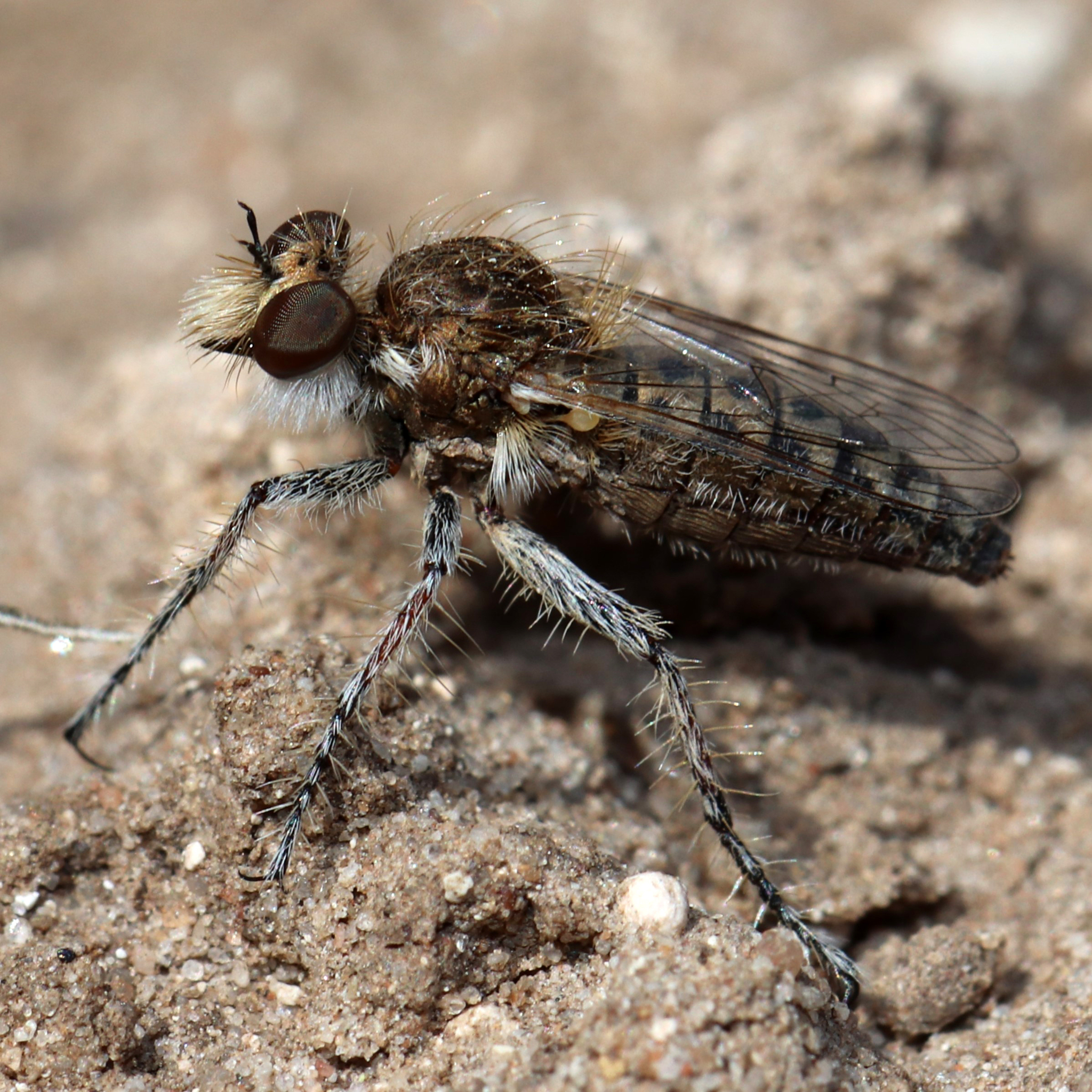
- Ablautus, Texas

Scientific classification
- Kingdom: Animalia
- Phylum: Arthropoda
- Class: Insecta
- Order: Diptera
- Family: Asilidae
- Subfamily: Willistonininae

Tribes
- Sisyrnodytini; Willistoninini

= Willistonininae =

Subfamily of flies

Willistonininae is a subfamily of robber flies in the family Asilidae. There are about 8 genera and more than 50 described species in Willistonininae, found in Africa, North America, and the Palearctic.

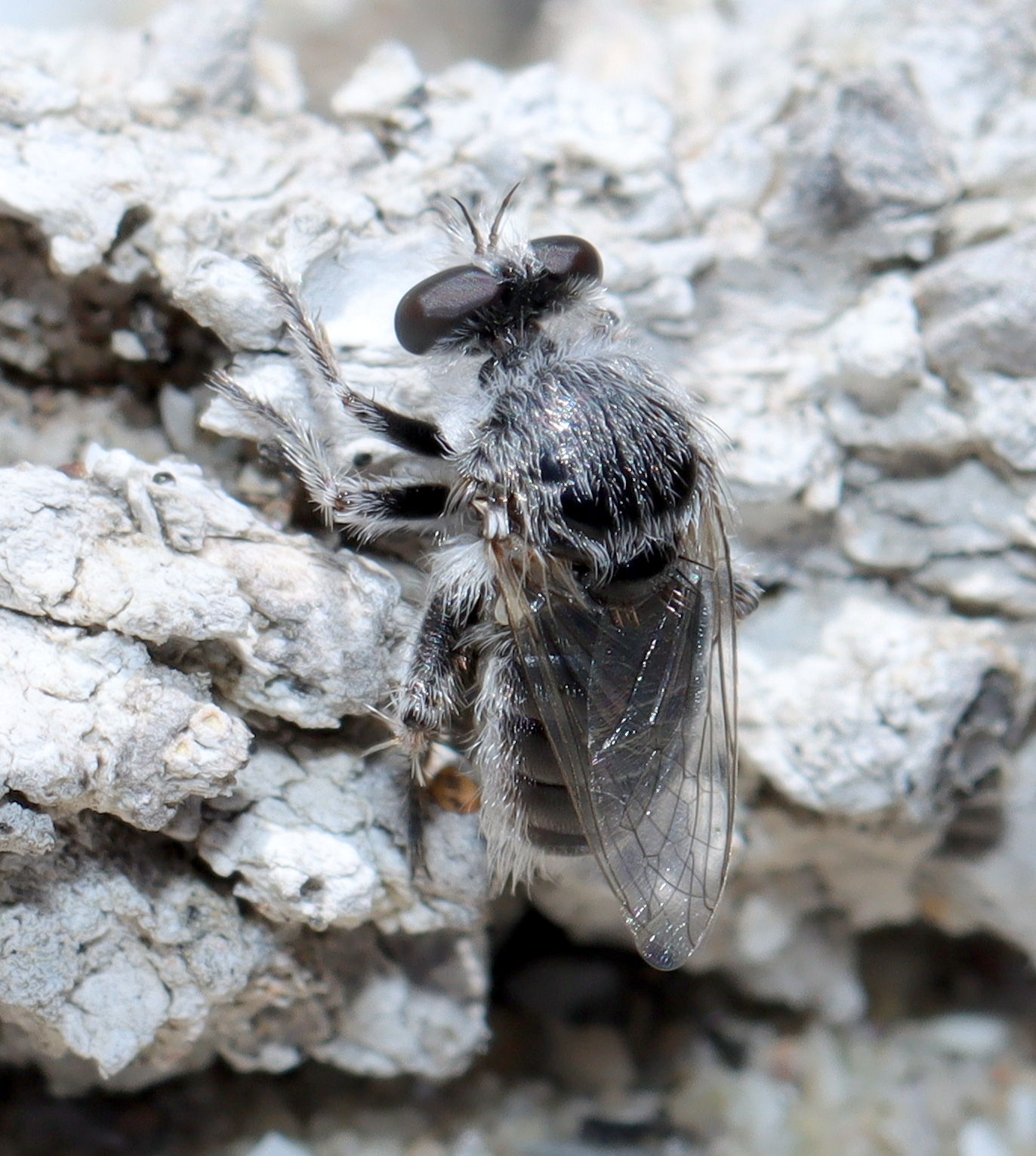
Sisyrnodytes, South Africa

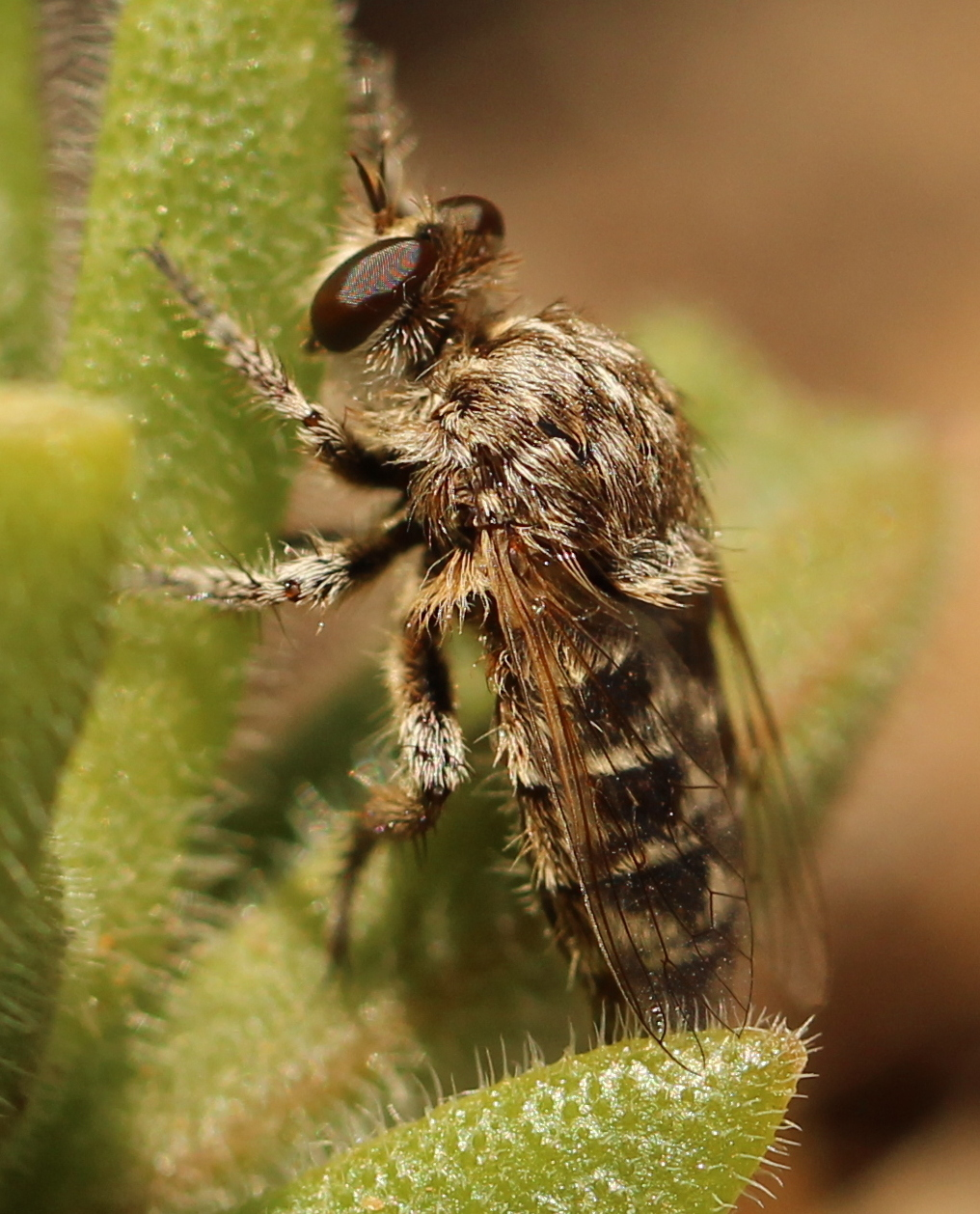
Acnephalomyia, South Africa

== Genera ==
These eight genera belong to the subfamily Willistonininae:

- Ablautus Loew, 1866 (western North America)
- Acnephalomyia Londt, 2010 (Afrotropical realm|Afrotropical)
- Ammodaimon Londt, 1985 (Afrotropical)
- Astiptomyia Londt, 2010 (Afrotropical)
- Sisyrnodytes Loew, 1856 (Palearctic)
- Sporadothrix Hermann, 1908 (Afrotropical)
- Trichoura Londt, 1994 (Afrotropical)
- Willistonina Back, 1909 (western North America)
