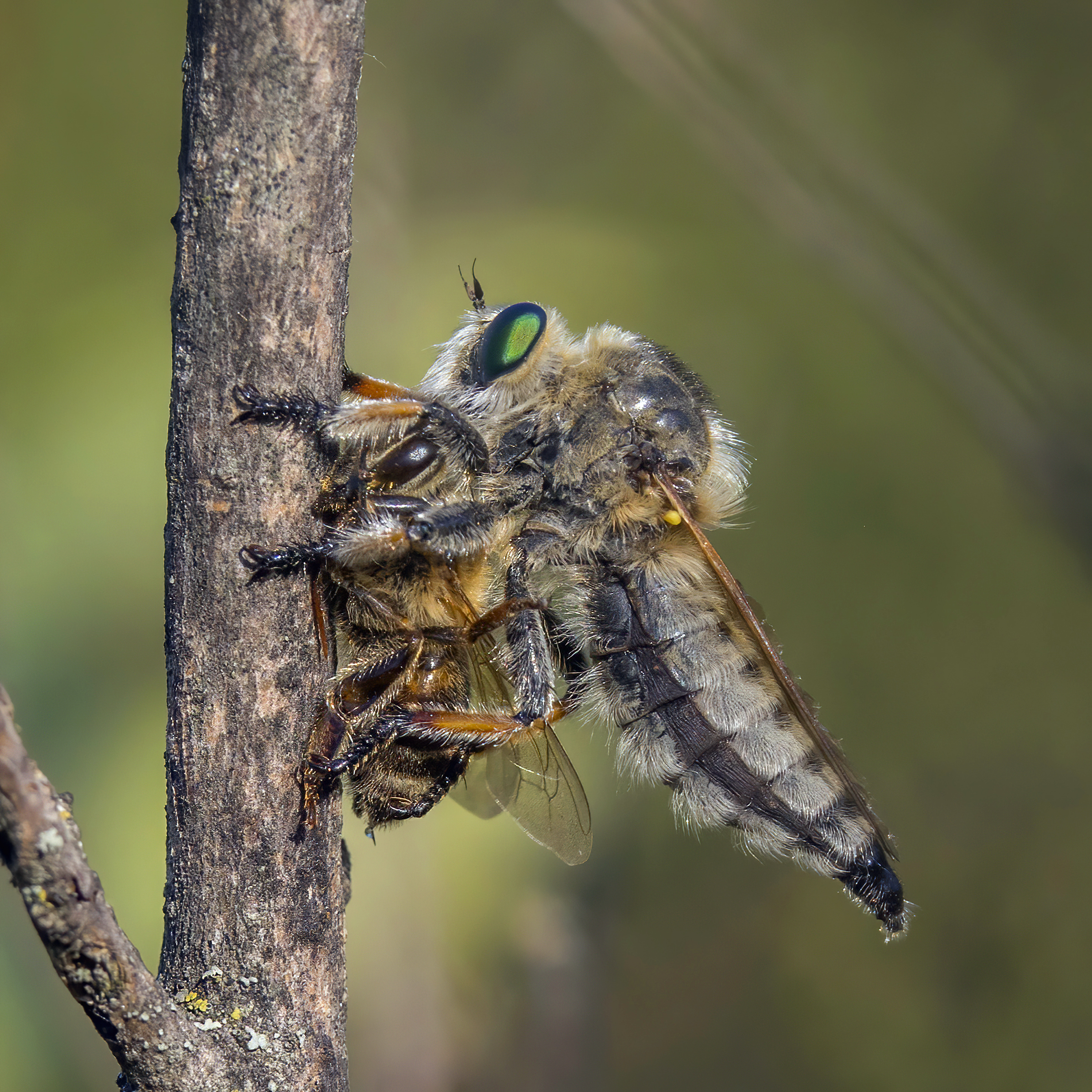
- Robber fly (Promachus leoninus) with honeybee prey

Scientific classification
- Kingdom: Animalia
- Phylum: Arthropoda
- Clade: Pancrustacea
- Class: Insecta
- Order: Diptera
- Suborder: Brachycera
- Infraorder: Asilomorpha
- Superfamily: Asiloidea
- Family: Asilidae; Latreille, 1802

Subfamilies
- Asilinae; Bathypogoninae; Brachyrhopalinae; Dasypogoninae; Dioctriinae; Laphriinae; Leptogastrinae; Phellinae; Stenopogoninae; Stichopogoninae; Tillobromatinae; Trigonomiminae; Willistonininae

= Asilidae =

Asilidae Temporal range: Aptian–Present

Family of flies

The Asilidae are the robber fly family, also called assassin flies. They are powerfully built, bristly flies with a short, stout proboscis enclosing the sharp, sucking hypopharynx. The name "robber flies" reflects their expert predatory habits; they feed mainly or exclusively on other insects and, as a rule, they wait in ambush and catch their prey in flight.

== Overview ==
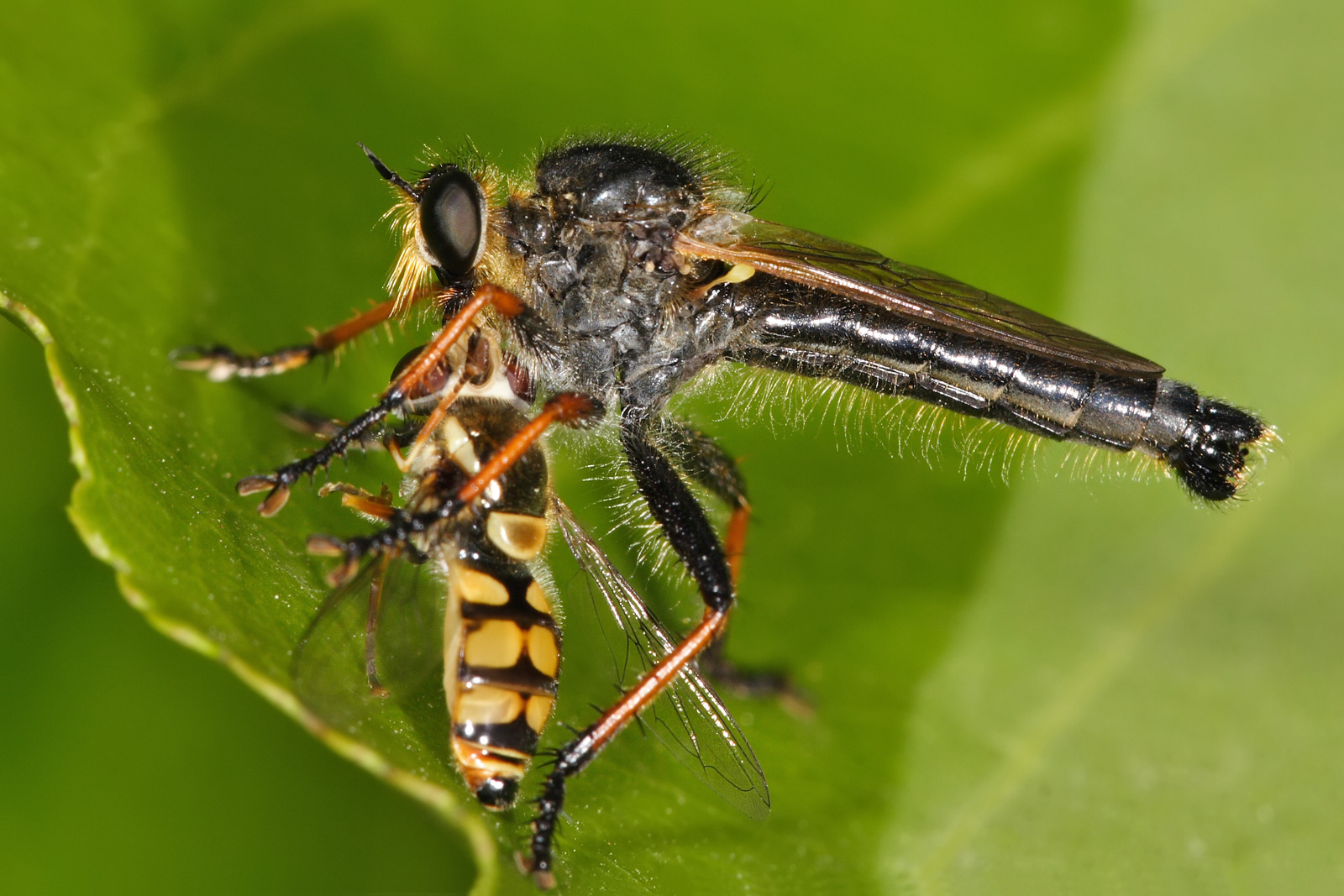
Zosteria sp.

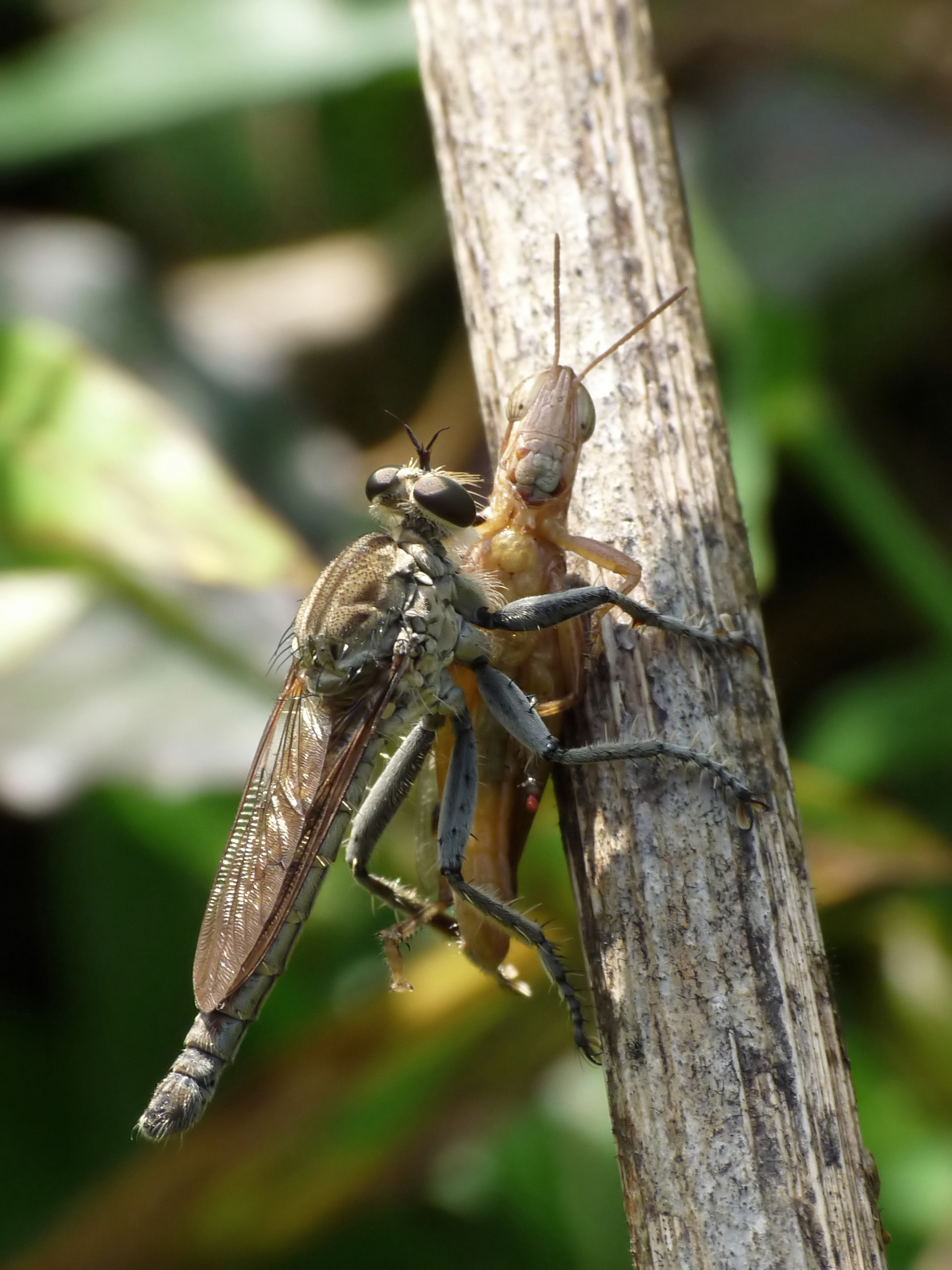
A member of the Asilidae feeding on a grasshopper. This asilid shows the mystax and ocular fringe typical of the Asilidae, with short, stout proboscis and spiny, powerful legs, adapted to the capture of prey in flight.

The Asilidae are a family in the order Diptera, the true flies. The common name for members of the family is robber flies, a name first suggested in 1869 by Alpheus Packard based on the German "Raubfliegen" (predatory flies—literally "robber flies," noting that robbery differs from thievery in the threat or use of force). The Asilidae are cosmopolitan, with over 7000 described species. Latreille was the authority for establishing the family in 1802. The Asilidae, together with Bombyliidae and Therevidae, are the most representative families of the superfamily of Asiloidea and they form one of the most characteristic groups of the lower Brachycera.

Robber flies have stout, spiny legs and three simple eyes (ocelli) in a characteristic depression on the tops of their head between their two large compound eyes. They also have a dense moustache of stiff bristles on the face; this is called the mystax, a term derived from the Greek mystakos meaning "moustache" or "upper lip". The mystax has been suggested to afford some protection for the head and face when the flies deal with struggling prey; various Asilidae prey on formidable species including stinging Hymenoptera, powerful grasshoppers, dragonflies and even other Asilidae – practically anything of a suitable size. Some Asilidae do, however, specialize in smaller prey, and this is reflected in their more gracile build.

In general, the family attacks a very wide range of prey, including other flies, beetles, butterflies and moths, various bees, ants, dragonflies and damselflies, ichneumon wasps, grasshoppers, and some spiders. They seem to do so irrespective of any repugnatorial chemicals the prey may have at their disposal. When attacked, many Asilidae do not hesitate to defend themselves in turn using their probosces and may deliver intensely painful bites to humans if handled incautiously.

The antennae are short, have three segments, and sometimes bear a bristle-like structure called an arista.

Though they are a very characteristic group for such a large family, the Asilidae may easily be confused with the related and less widely known family Therevidae. Some points of contrast between the families include that the labium in the Therevidae is not a piercing, predatory organ, but ends in two fleshy labella adapted to the sucking of liquid foods. Again, the Therevidae commonly have fluffy setae above the mouthparts, unlike the stiff chaetae comprising the mystax of the Asilidae. Furthermore, in the Asilidae the depression on the vertex between the eyes tends to be more obvious than in the Therevidae.

A male Laphria flava feeding on a Rhynocoris annulatus

The fly attacks its prey by stabbing it with its short, strong proboscis, injecting the victim with saliva containing neurotoxic and proteolytic enzymes which very rapidly paralyze the victim and soon digest the insides; the fly then sucks the liquefied material through the proboscis.

Many Asilidae have long, tapering abdomens, sometimes with a sword-like ovipositor. Others, for instance Laphria, are fat-bodied bumblebee mimics.

Female robber flies deposit whitish-colored eggs on low-lying plants and grasses, or in crevices within soil, bark, or wood. Egg-laying habits depend on the species and their specific habitat; most species lay their eggs in masses, which are then covered with a chalky protective coating.

After hatching, robber fly larvae generally live in soil, rotting wood, leaf mold, and similar materials, some being predatory and others detrivorous. Larvae are also predacious, feeding on eggs, larvae, or other soft-bodied insects. Robber flies overwinter as larvae and pupate in the soil. Pupae migrate to the soil surface and emerge as adults, often leaving behind their pupal casing. Complete development ranges from one to three years, depending on species and environmental conditions.

== Morphology ==
=== Adult ===
Adult robber flies have an average body width of 1 to 1.5 cm (0.39 to 0.59 in), and a range of 3 mm (0.12 in) to more than 5 cm (2.0 in) in length. They generally appear elongated due to the conformation of the long tapering abdomen, however there are also compact species with broad abdomens. The integument is covered with thick hair, especially on the head and thorax and liveries are often showy, with colors ranging from brown to black to grey, sometimes in contrast with other colors such as red and yellow. Frequently they are aposematic, imitating the livery of Hymenoptera.

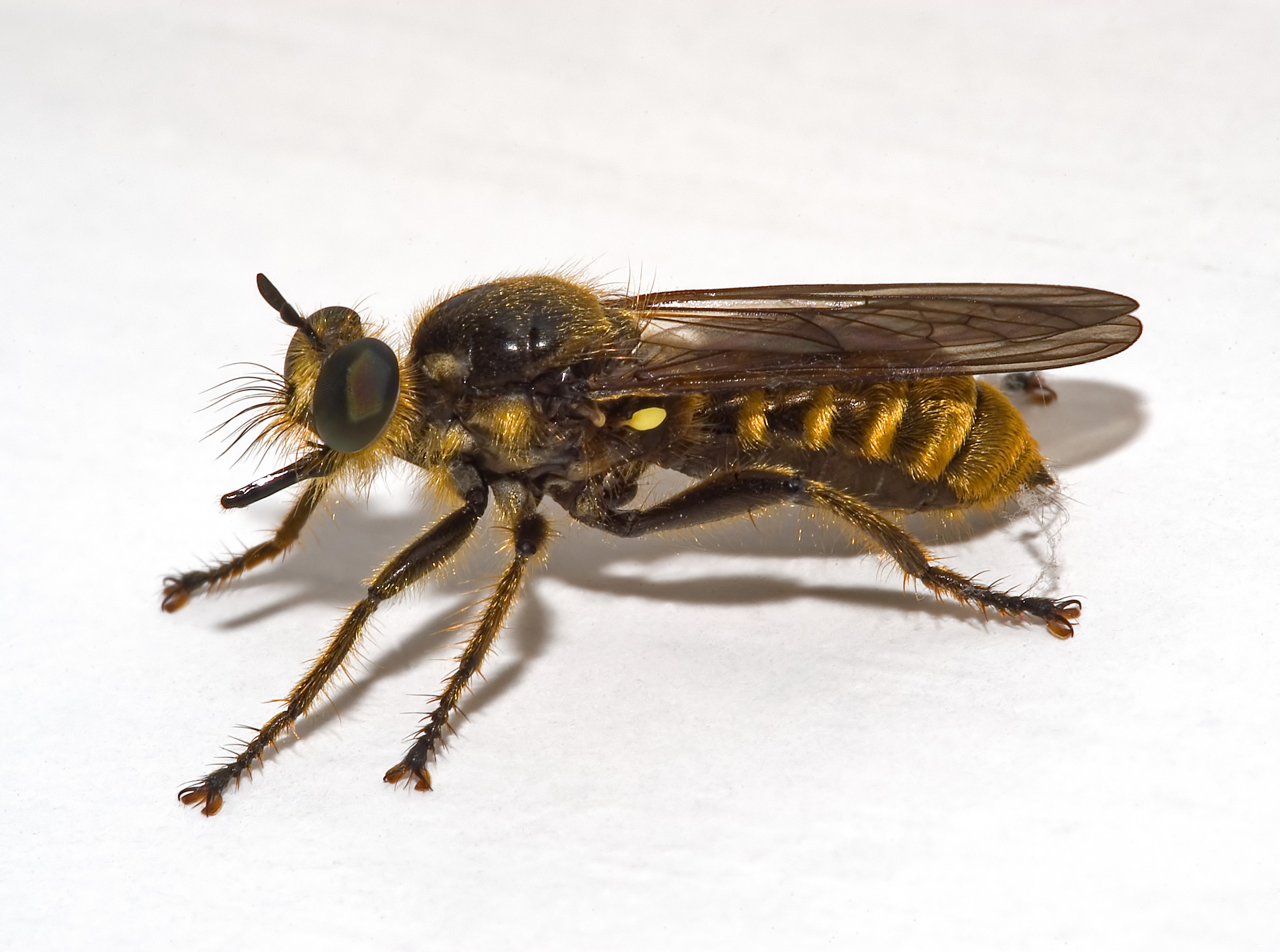
Choerades fimbriata: a powerful predator with body adapted to fast flight. Note the mystax, the proboscis and the depression between the eyes.

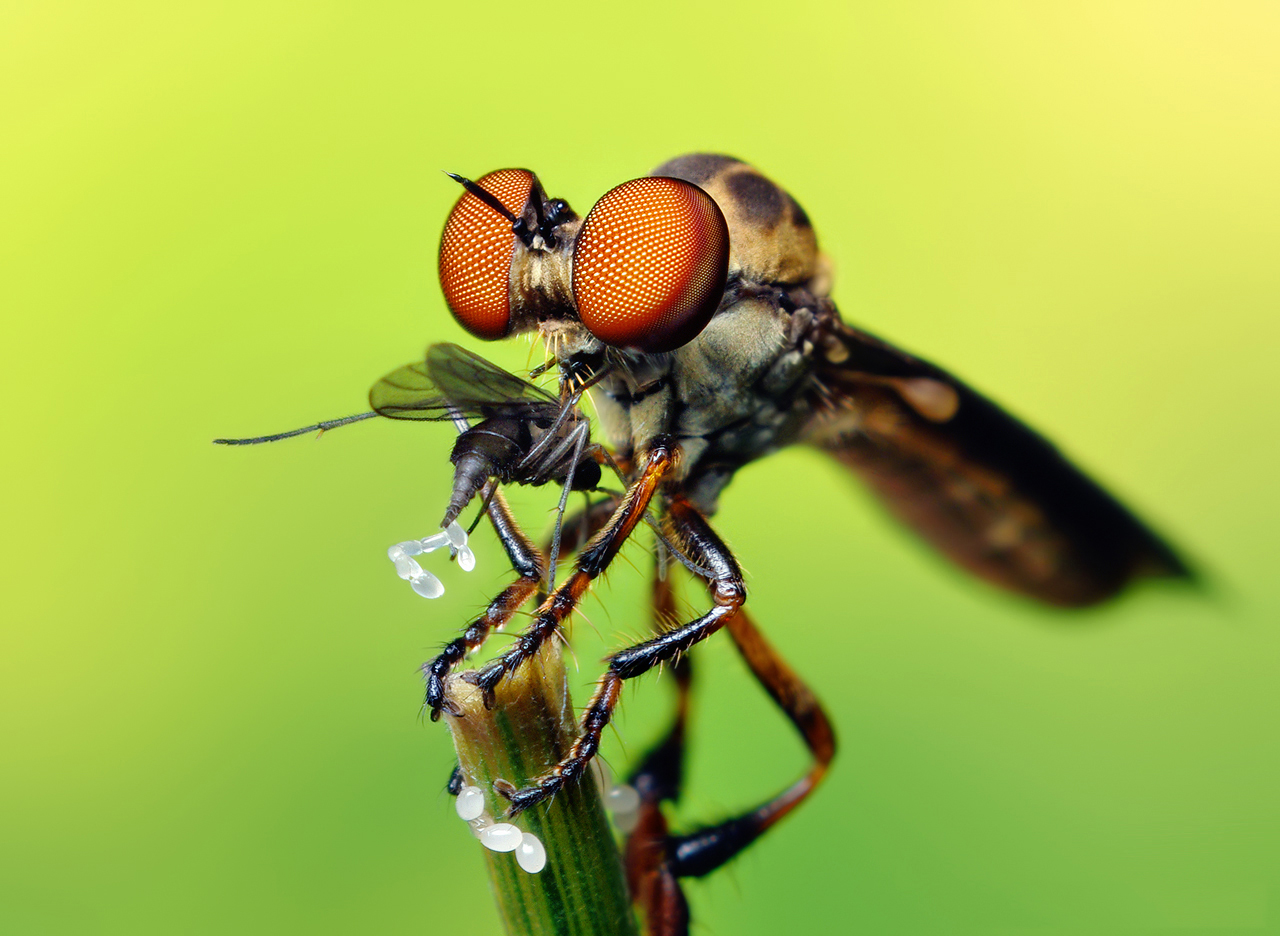
Head-on view showing the characteristic depression formed by the elevation of the compound eyes

The head is free and mobile and dichoptic in both sexes and has three ocelli arranged in a characteristic depression formed by the elevation of the compound eyes. This feature is clearly visible in the front view and is a morphological peculiarity of Asilidae. The occipital region has one or more rows of bristles aligned behind the posterior margin of the eye. The facial region has a convex profile with a characteristic dense bundle of bristles, called a mystax. The mystax helps protect the head and face when the fly encounters prey bent on defense. Other bristles are arranged on the ocellar tubercle.

The antennae are of the aristate type, composed typically of five segments but sometimes from three to four, depending on the structure of the stylus. The scape and pedicel are generally relatively short and hairy; the third segment (or first flagellomere) has an oval or oblong shape, is generally longer than the two basal segments, and bears a stylus generally composed of two segments, of which the basal is very short. In some asilids, the stylus can be monoarticolate or absent.

Section of Asilidae mouthparts a: labrum; b: hypopharynx; c: maxillary palp; d: maxillae; e: food canal; f: labium

The mouthparts are short, being modified for piercing and sucking. The strongly sclerotized proboscis is composed of the labium and maxillae which form a food canal, the labrum and a piercing organ, the hypopharynx. The proboscis is either rounded in cross section or compressed laterally or dorsoventrally; it is usually stout and straight and is sometimes able to penetrate through the hard integument of Coleoptera. The maxillary palpi are at the base beside the labium, two-segmented in all Dasypogoninae or single segmented in Asilinae and Leptogastrinae.

The thorax is robust and compact. Unlike in other lower Brachycera, it bears long bristles (macrochaeta) useful as taxonomic characters. Bristles of this type are always present on the notopleuron (notopleural bristles) and, in two series, on mesonotum (dorsocentral, supralar and postalar). Other bristles are present on the metanotum (dorsocentral), bristles on the ventral episternum and at the apex of the mesoscutellum.

Basal plan of the wing venation. Longitudinal veins: C: costa; Sc: subcosta; R: radius; M: media; Cu: cubitus; A: anal. Crossveins: h: humeral; r-m: radio-medial; m-m: medial; m-cu: medio-cubital Cells: d: discal; br: 1st basal; bm: 2nd basal; r1: marginal; r3: 1st submarginal; r5: 1st posterior; m3: 4th posterior; cup: cell cup

The legs are relatively long and strong, with many macrochaetes performing a raptorial function. The wings are well developed, often relatively narrow for speedy flight; the alula is generally well developed, with the exception of the Leptogastrinae and part of Dasypogoninae. The venation is much as in the Rhagionidae, Tabanidae, and Therevidae; the radial R is always four-branched, with R2+3 unbranched. Details of wing venation determine subfamilies and lower taxa. The wings are most often hyaline, but sometimes smoky or dark colored, or partly infuscated in many genera or completely darkened. The abdomen consists of six to eight visible segments preceding the genitalia in males, but the eighth segment is sometimes entirely or partially concealed, and terminal forming the ovipositor. It is long and narrow conical in most species, but wide, dorsoventrally flattened and short in bee mimics. In the Leptogastrinae, the abdomen is extremely long and slender. In some tribes, the male undergoes axial torsion of 180°.

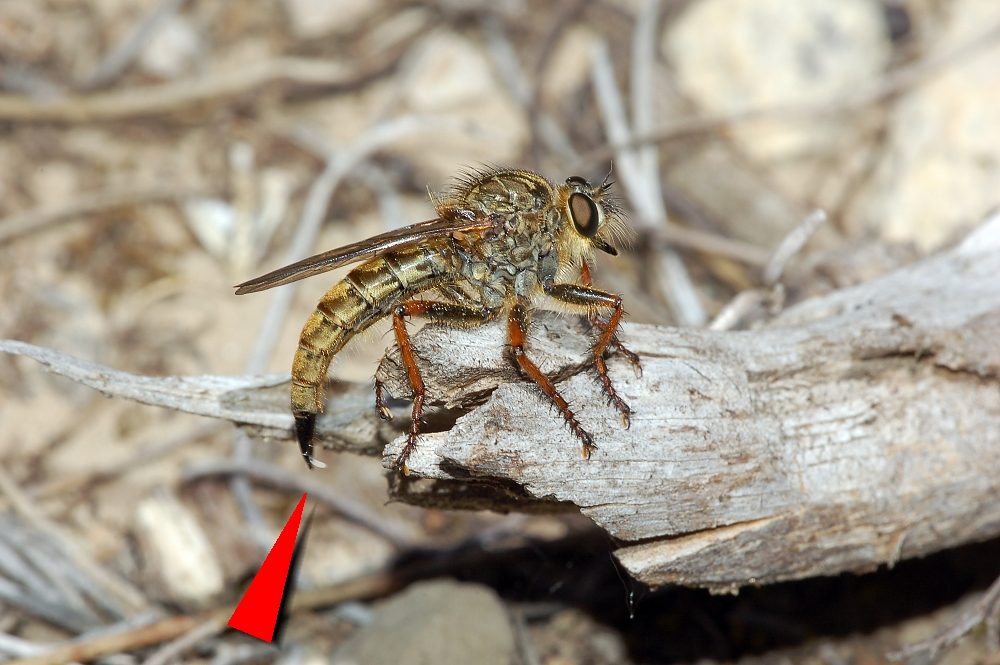
Egglaying

=== Egg ===
The egg is hyaline or pigmented, of variable shape from spherical to oval, and up to 2 mm in length. The surface can be smooth or bear microsculptures, which are generally polygonal and visible only in the electron microscope.

=== Larva ===
The larva is apodous, cylindrical, and elongated, more or less flattened dorsoventrally and tapered at the cephalic and caudal ends. The colour is white or yellowish. The head is small, rugged, dark-pigmented and hypognathous, while the abdomen is composed of eight apparent segments, with the last two often fused and more or less reduced. The respiratory system is amphineustic, with two pairs of spiracles, one thoracic and one abdominal. Also, rudimentary and nonfunctional spiracles occur in other abdominal segments.

=== Pupa ===
The pupa is naked, as in the majority of the Orthorrhapha, exarate and therefore able to move.

== Biology ==
The Asilidae are predators, in both the juvenile and the adult stages, and feed on small arthropods, mainly insects. Although predatory forms in the adult stage are present in other taxonomic groups of Diptera, the Asilidae are the most representative for the number of species and for uniformity of feeding behavior (>7000 species, all of which are predatory). The combination of high biodiversity and high predatory activity leads to this family playing an important role in the ecological stability of entomofauna.

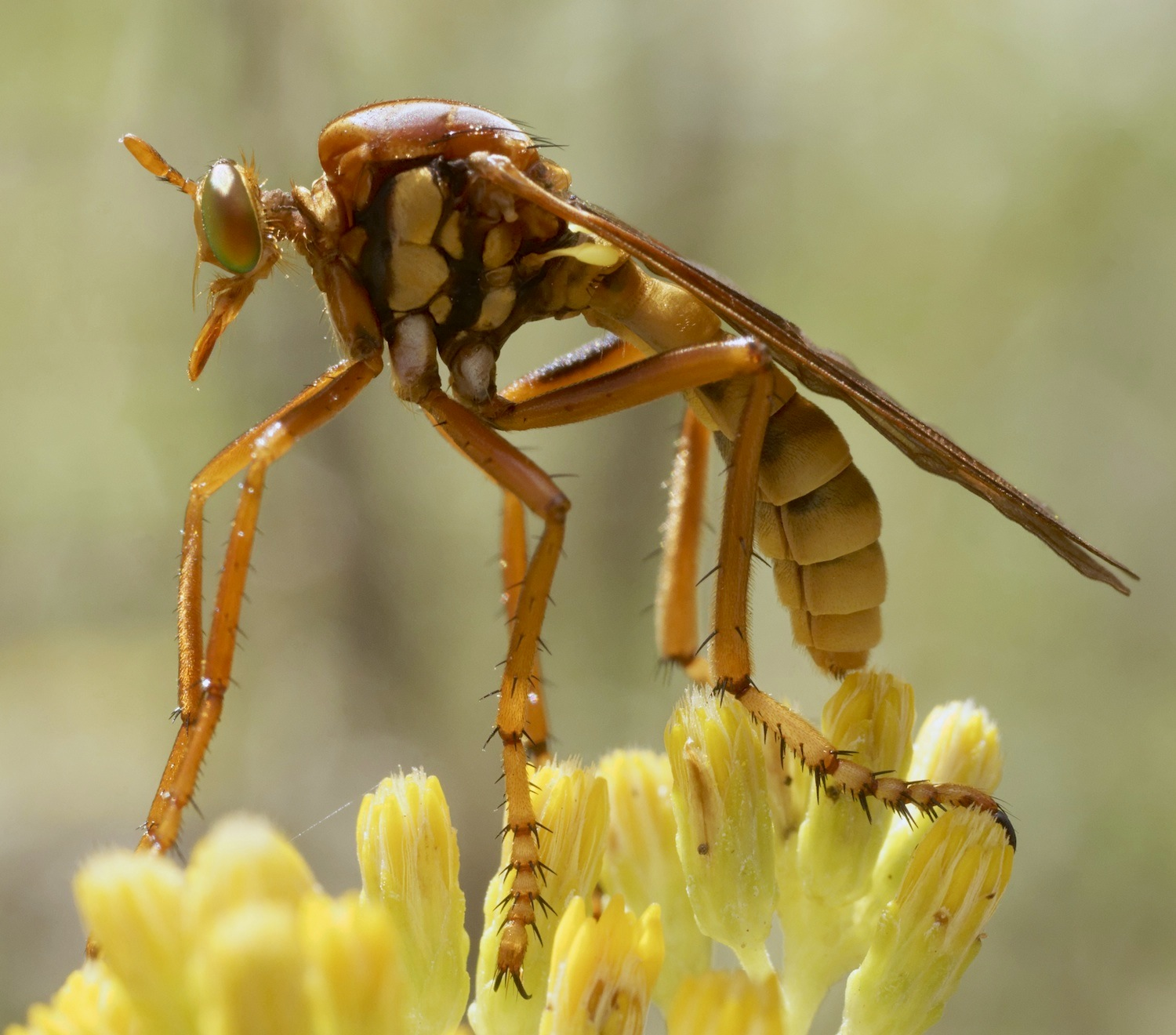
Blepharepium sonorensis, a robber fly that closely resembles Polistes paper wasp species such as P. apachus

The life cycle takes place in 1–3 years. The postembryonic development consists of four larval stages (instars) and one pupa. The larvae of the first instar differ from other stages in both ethology and trophic regime. The larvae of most known asilids live in the soil or in the case of some taxonomic groups, in rotting organic material, usually wood and the bark of dead trees.

With regard to feeding behavior, most of the literature describes Asilidae larvae as entomophagous, but doubts remain about the real nature of the trophic regime and its mechanisms. The entomophagy of some species had indeed been already hypothesized by some authors of the 19th century, based on the findings of larvae of asilids associated with larvae of other insects, but Melin (1923) asserted that, in reality, predation was occasional and secondary to the plant-based diet. More recent studies have confirmed the entomophagy of some asilids without extending this species' feeding behavior for the whole family. Less certain, however, is the mechanism of entomophagy: in general, the behavior is cited as predation, but for some species may be ectoparasitoids. Musso (1983) described the feeding behavior of the larvae of Machimus rusticus: the larvae of the first instar does not feed on insects, those of the second instar feed on secretions by larvae of beetles (and may cause death), while the larvae of the third and fourth instars actually behave like predators. In short, the feeding behavior of larval asilids can be intermediate between predation and ectoparasitism.

Much better known and described in detail is the behavior of adults. In general, predation in adults is concentrated in the hottest hours in open, sunny spaces, while at night, they take refuge in dense vegetation. The Asilidae are excellent flyers, and in most of the family, capture prey in flight. They are often seen stationed to ambush prey at strategic points. This behavior signifies that sight plays an essential role in the detection of prey and their capture.

A robber fly with a honey bee. Includes slow motion.

The prey is caught with the tarsi and injected with a paralyzing saliva. The asilid pierces the integument of the prey with the prepharynx (hypopharynx) in preferential points of least resistance such as the eyes, the membranous area of transition between the head and thorax (neck) or between thorax and abdomen, or between the last abdominal tergites. Puncture is followed by the injection of saliva, whose active components perform two functions: neurotoxins cause paralysis of the victim, while proteolytic enzymes lead to the breakup and liquefaction of internal tissues. In a short time, the predator is able to feed by sucking the internal fluids through the alimentary canal.

With regard to interspecific trophic relationships, a large number of reports exists on the prey captured by the Asilidae. Lavigne (2003) has developed a database comprising over 13,000 reports. The prey of Asilidae are predominantly represented by other insects, mostly winged, but several cases in which they have attacked spiders have also been reported. Within the insects, orders that include the most frequent prey of asilids include a wide range of families within the Coleoptera, Hymenoptera, other Diptera, Hemiptera, and Lepidoptera; prey belonging to various other orders (Odonata, Neuroptera, Isoptera, Thysanoptera, Blattodea, etc.) are also mentioned.

With regard to the specificity of the trophic relationship, Wood (1981) mentions some studies in the literature on the subject. Some genera have been found to be monophagic, but more generally Asilidae are polyphagic, with behaviors that vary from narrow specialization to broad prey choice.

Other studies have shown that the ratio between the size of the prey and the asilid varies from 1.8:1 to 3.7:1, with an average of 2.6:1. The ratio tends to increase with decreasing size of the predator.

Didysmachus picipes lays eggs on an ear of grass

Egg-laying takes place, according to the species, with three different behaviors that relate to the structure and the morphology of the abdomen. Females with an undifferentiated ovipositor release eggs randomly and independently from the substrate. In other cases, however, the abdomen bears a differentiated, specialized ovipositor to lay eggs in the soil or sand, or lay them in cavities within plant tissues.

== Venom ==
Robber flies possess a specialized venom system used in prey capture, delivered through modified salivary glands that open into the proboscis. Modern transcriptomic and proteomic studies have shown that their venom is a complex secretion containing both neuroactive peptides and enzymatic components involved in extra-oral digestion, with a particular emphasis on the former in an atypical fashion for other venomous insects which feed on the liquids of their prey.

These venoms include a set of lineage-specific protein and peptide families collectively termed asilidins, many of which appear to have arisen through repeated recruitment and diversification of non-toxin gene families. Functional assays of crude venom demonstrate rapid paralysis of insect prey, supporting a primarily predatory role for the secretion. Research over the last decade has revealed significant interspecific variation in venom composition among robber flies and highlights Asilidae as one of the most recently characterized venomous insect lineages.

One of the classes of compounds identified within robber fly venom is the asilidins, a diverse set of peptides that includes members with clear structural and functional parallels to other arthropod neurotoxins. Among them, Asilidin-1 is notable for possessing the inhibitory cystine knot (ICK) fold, a densely cross-linked motif that imparts high stability and enables precise interaction with neuronal ion channels. This ICK-based architecture is closely tied to the peptide's neurotoxic effects and likely contributes to the rapid prey immobilization that characterizes asilid predation. The presence of such ICK neurotoxins mirrors similar adaptations seen in unrelated predatory taxa, including spiders (e.g., ω-agatoxins and δ-atracotoxins), scorpions (e.g., calcins), cone snails (e.g., conotoxins), and certain centipedes (e.g., Ssm Spooky Toxin) thus highlighting a broader pattern of convergent evolution toward compact, durable, and highly active venom peptides across the animal kingdom.

== Habitat and ecology ==
Asilidae generally occur in habitats that are open, sunny, and dry, even arid. They favor open or scattered vegetation, and some species even frequent bare ground. Typical habitats include savannah, forest steppe, open steppe, semidesert, maquis shrubland, and related shrubland types such as fynbos and chaparral. Their biodiversity is lower in forested ecosystems, and where asilids do occur in such environments, they tend to concentrate in the glades and margins. In those conditions, the interrupted canopy leaves space for various species of shrubs and herbaceous plants suited to asilid styles of predation.

In general, the biology of the Asilidae is still poorly known, but various authors have studied the population distribution in particular regions and ecosystems. They have classified the behavioral patterns in terms of microenvironments, ecological, and trophic factors, showing how different species of Asilidae favor particular habitats suited to particular patterns of reproduction and predation. Specific studies show correlations between the floristic composition and predatory behavior.

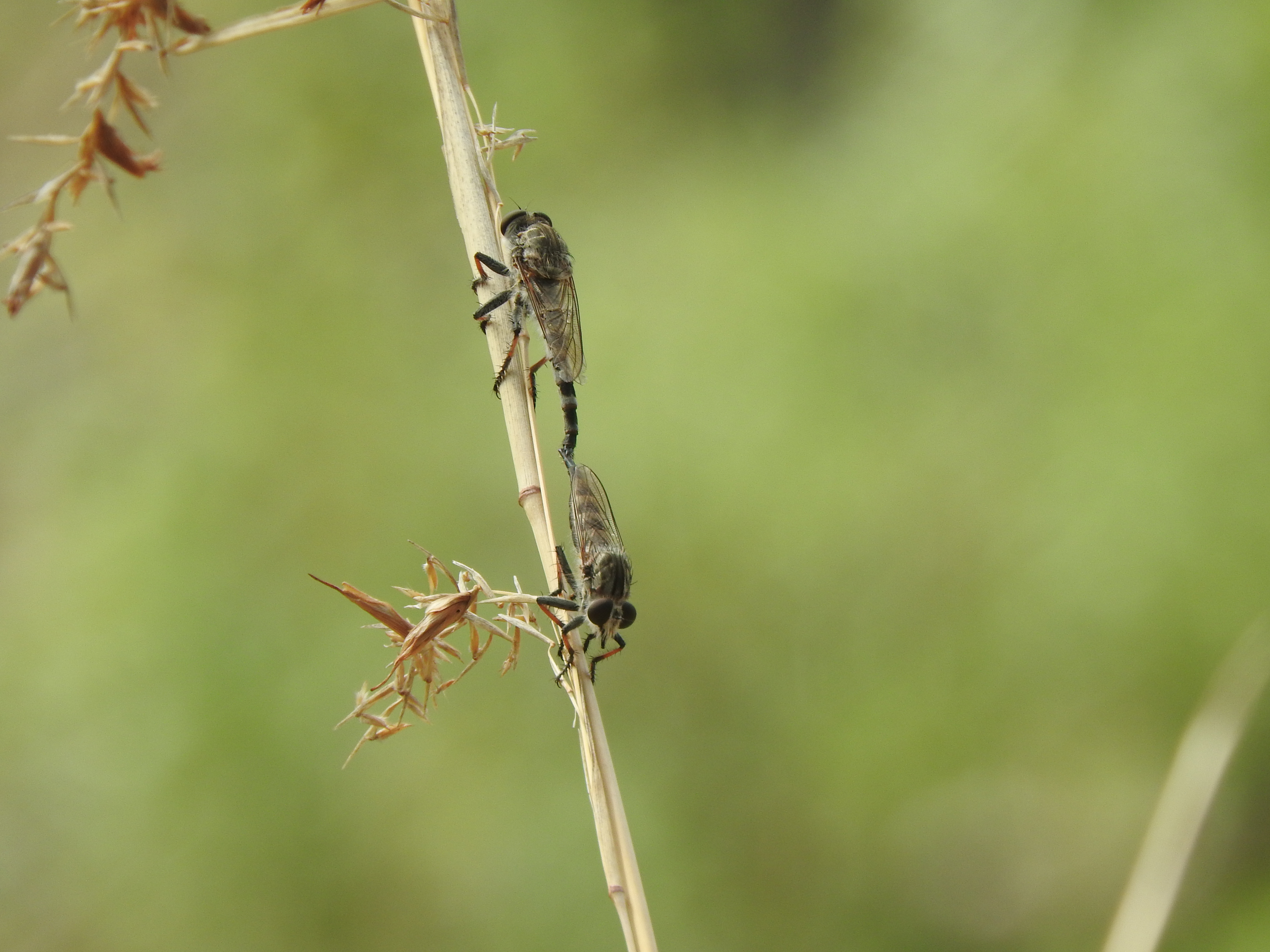
Robber flies (Asilidae) mating in a blade of lemon grass, in Western Ghats India

== Distribution ==
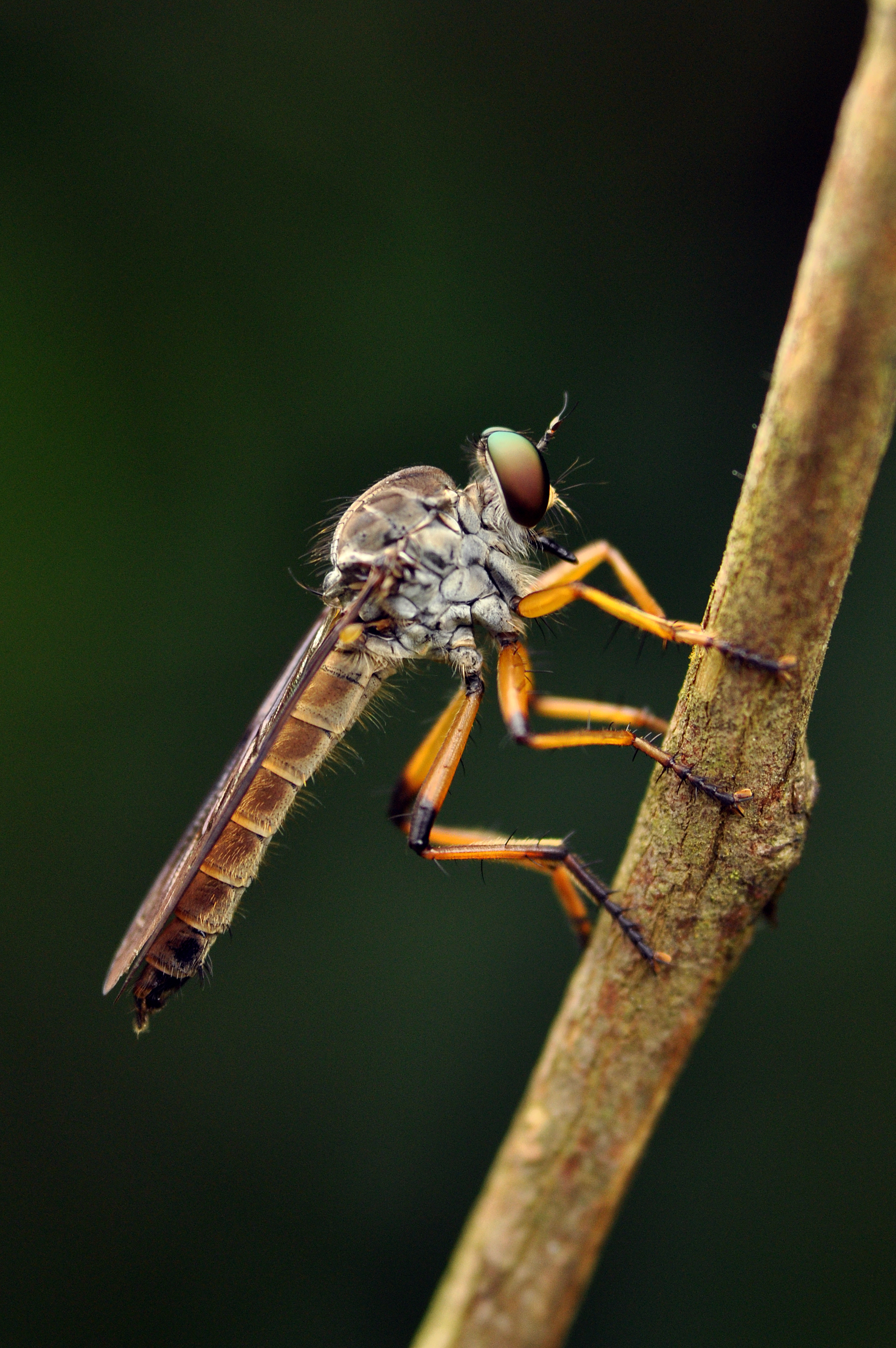
Asilidae Robber fly from the Anaimalai hills, Western Ghats, India

Asilidae occur in all zoogeographical regions except Antarctica. In the Northern Hemisphere, some species are even adapted to tundra. Alpine species occur at altitudes exceeding 4000 meters. However, the highest levels of biodiversity are in warm climates; tropical or subtropical and arid or semi-arid regions tend to have the greatest variety of species, followed by areas where rainfall is highly seasonal.

== Systematics ==
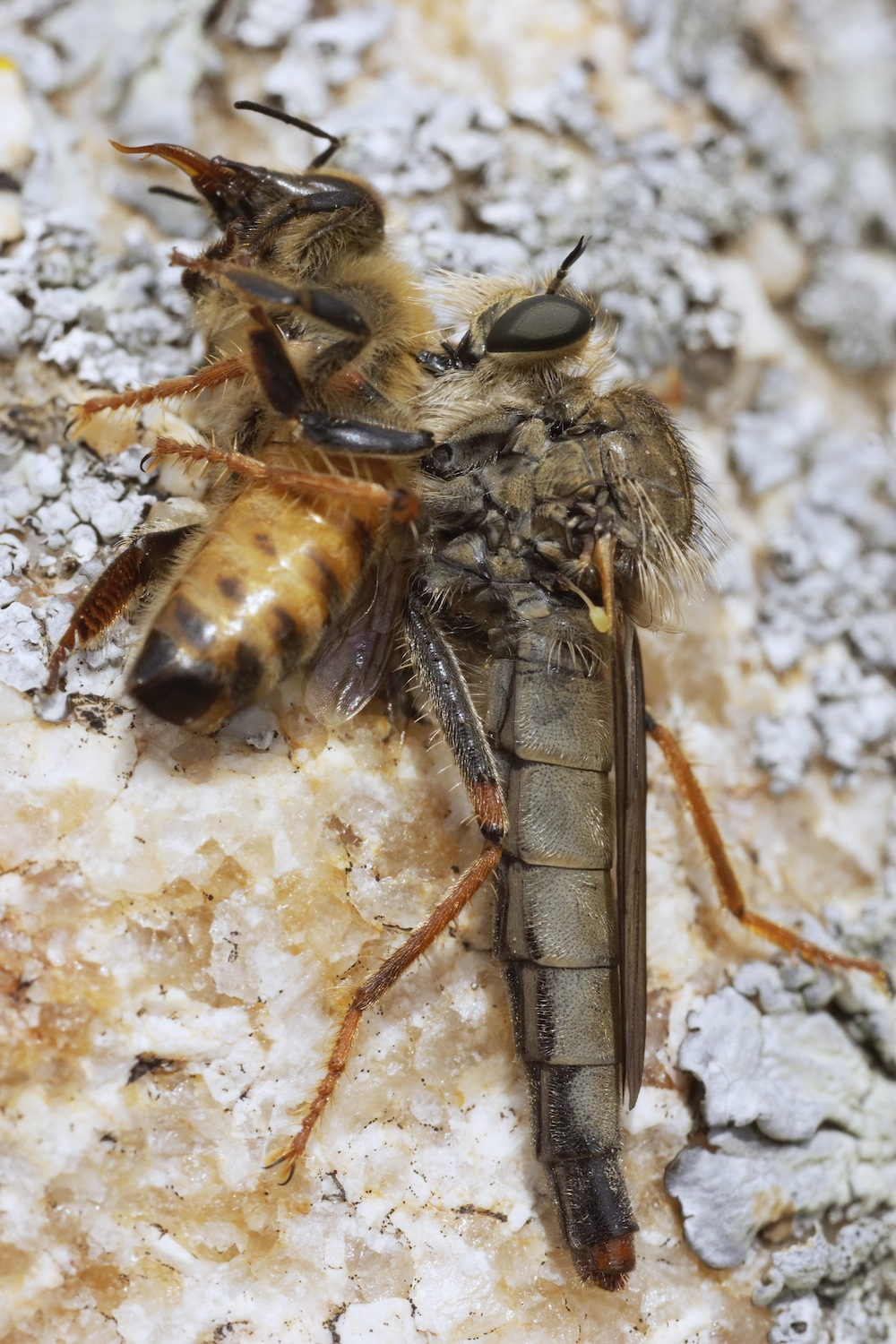
Female Stenopogon martini feeding on a honeybee

The Asilidae currently include over 7500 described species in about 556 genera. Their taxonomy is still under study in the light of new specimens and cladistic analysis. The 14 accepted subfamilies are:

- Asilinae
- Bathypogoninae
- Brachyrhopalinae
- Dasypogoninae
- Dioctriinae
- Laphriinae
- Leptogastrinae
- Phellinae
- Stenopogoninae
- Stichopogoninae
- Tillobromatinae
- Trigonomiminae
- Willistonininae

The oldest known member of the family is Araripogon from the Early Cretaceous (Aptian) Crato Formation of Brazil.

== Phylogeny ==
- Asiloidea
  - N.N.
    - ? Scenopinidae and Therevidae
    - ? Mydidae and Apioceridae
    - ? Asilidae
  - Bombyliidae

Clade showing relationship of Asiloidea

== Notable researchers ==
Carl Linnaeus (Linné; 1758), in the 10th edition of Systema Naturae, erected the genus Asilus, including 11 species, and added four others in the 12th edition (1767). Asilus crabroniformis (1758) is the type of the genus. The rank of family is credited to Leach in Samouelle (1819). Johan Christian Fabricius in five publications dated from 1775 to 1805, erected the genus Damalis and described 76 exotic and European species. Wiedemann, in publications appearing between 1817 and 1830, described 235 species, many exotic. Johann Wilhelm Meigen in an early work of 1803 erected four genera, three of which now represent subfamilies. He also described many species in Systematische Beschreibung der bekannten europäischen zweiflügeligen Insekten (1800 to 1838). During the rest of the 19th century, significant contributions were made by Hermann Loew in particular. Other prominent authors dealing with the Asilidae during the 19th century included Pierre-Justin-Marie Macquart, Francis Walker, Camillo Rondani, and Jacques Marie François Bigot.

== See also ==
- List of soldierflies and allies of Great Britain
- List of Asilidae species
- List of Asilidae genera
