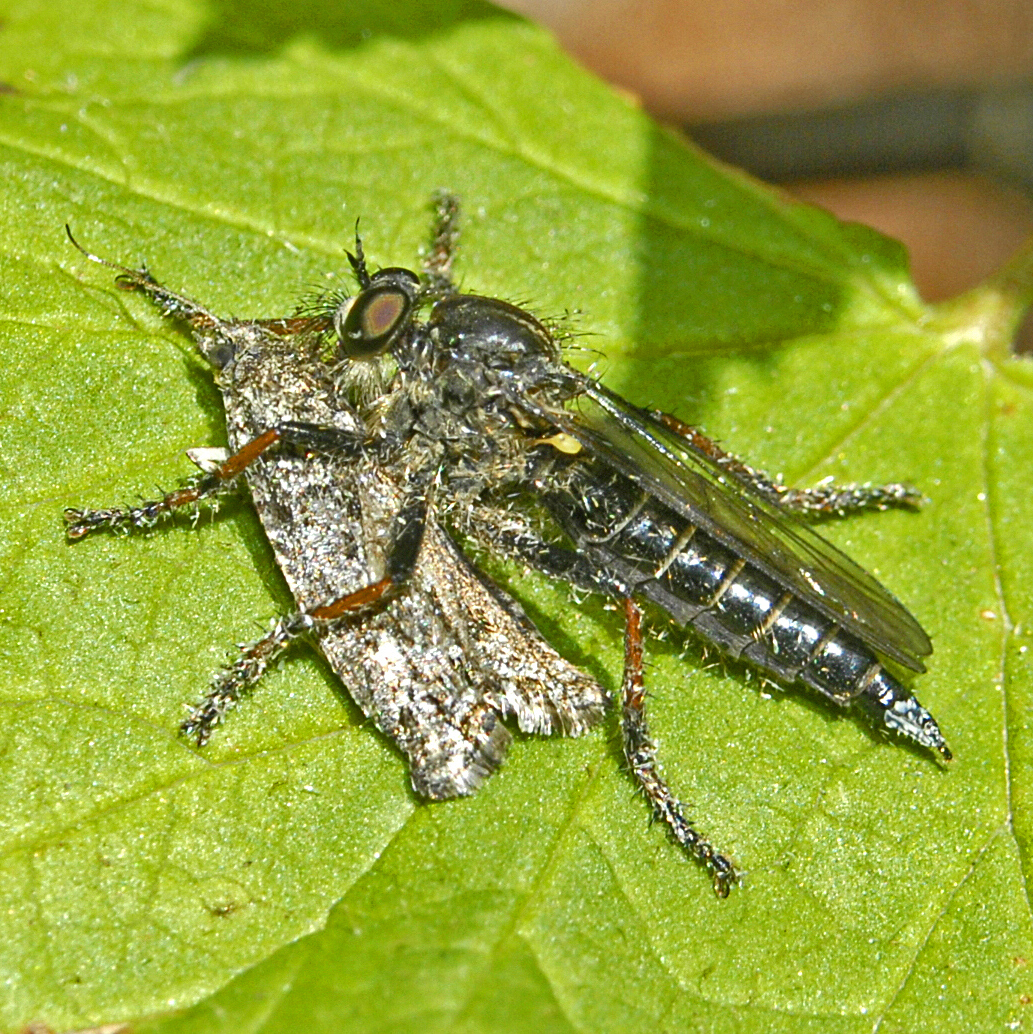
- Stilpnogaster aemula preys a micromoth. Female

Scientific classification
- Domain: Eukaryota
- Kingdom: Animalia
- Phylum: Arthropoda
- Class: Insecta
- Order: Diptera
- Family: Asilidae
- Genus: Stilpnogaster
- Species: S. aemula

Binomial name
- Stilpnogaster aemula (Meigen, 1820)

Synonyms
- Asilus fasciata Megerle, 1820; Asilus incerta Wiedemann, 1820; Asilus nigricans Macquart, 1834

= Stilpnogaster aemula =

Species of fly

Stilpnogaster aemula is a species of 'stiletto flies' belonging to the family Asilidae.

== Subspecies ==
Subspecies include:

- Stilpnogaster aemula aemula (Meigen, 1820)
- Stilpnogaster aemula setiventris (Zetterstedt, 1860)

== Distribution ==
This species is present in part of Europe (Austria, Czech Republic, France, Germany, Italy, Poland, Romania, Slovakia, Sweden, former Yugoslavia and Switzerland).

== Description ==
Stilpnogaster aemula can reach a body length of about 14–16 millimetres (0.55–0.63 in). Face is covered with pubescence and shows a narrow shiny longitudinal marking. Tergites and sternites are shiny black, with tomentose hind margins of each segment. Discal bristles on tergites are well-developed. Metatarsus of mid leg is of usual length.

== Gallery ==
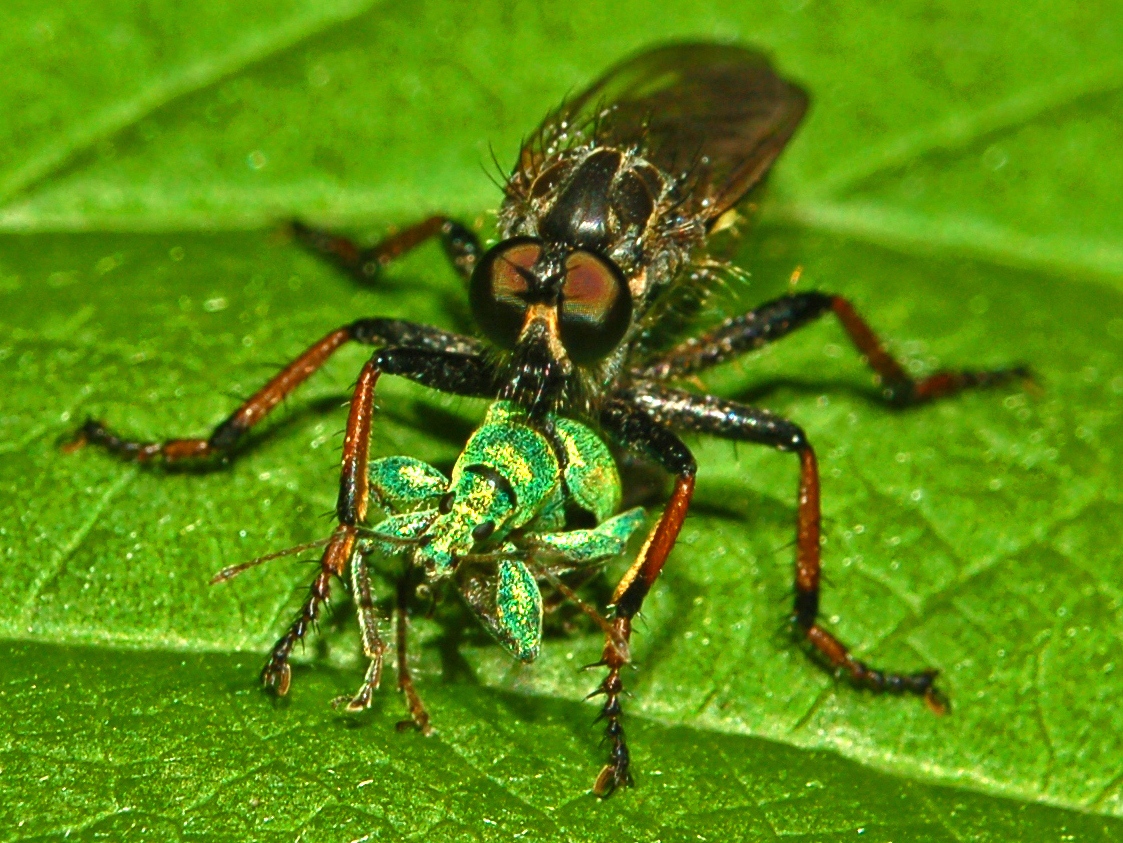
Stilpnogaster aemula preys a Polydrusus species

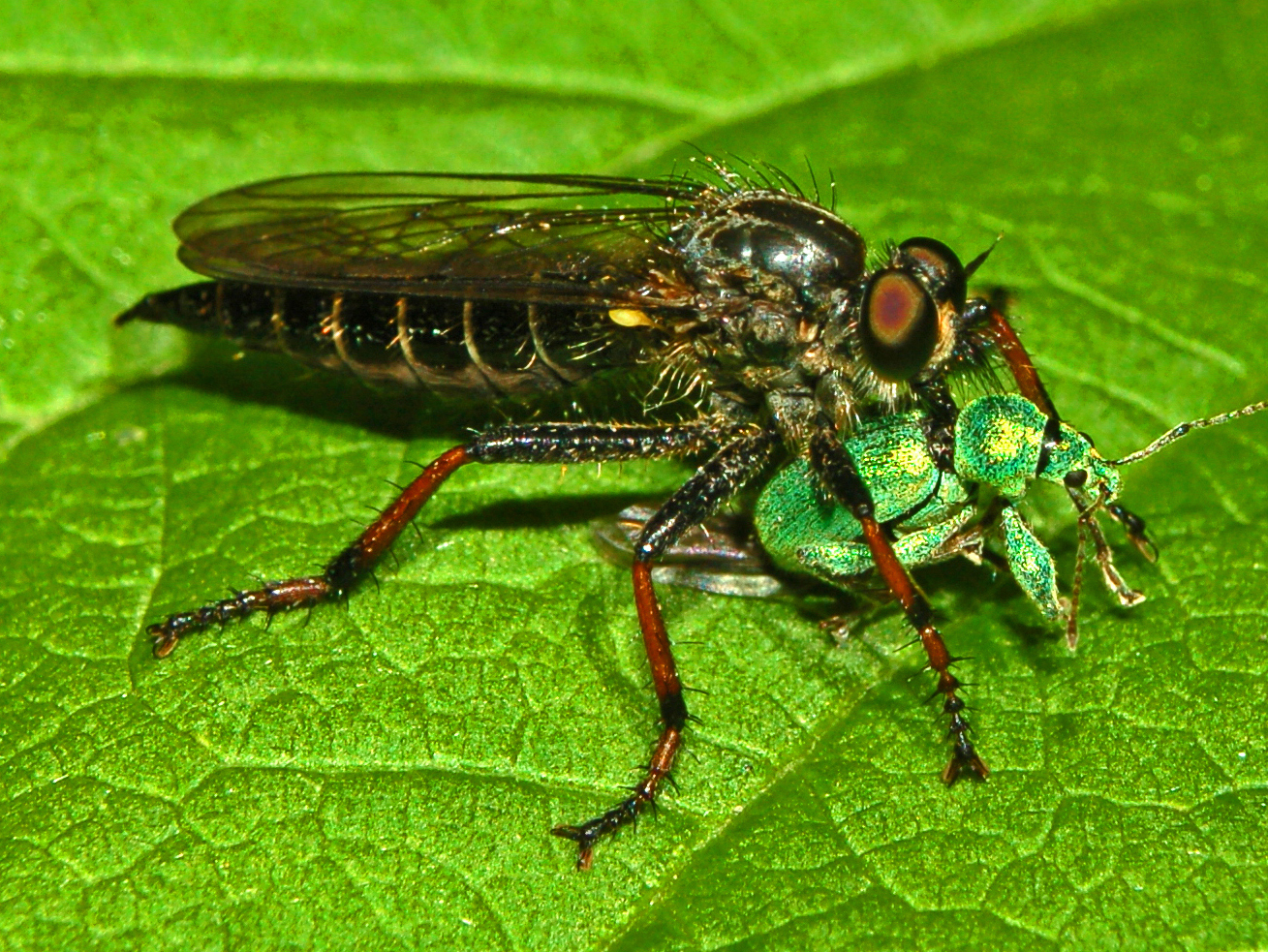
S. aemula with prey. Side view

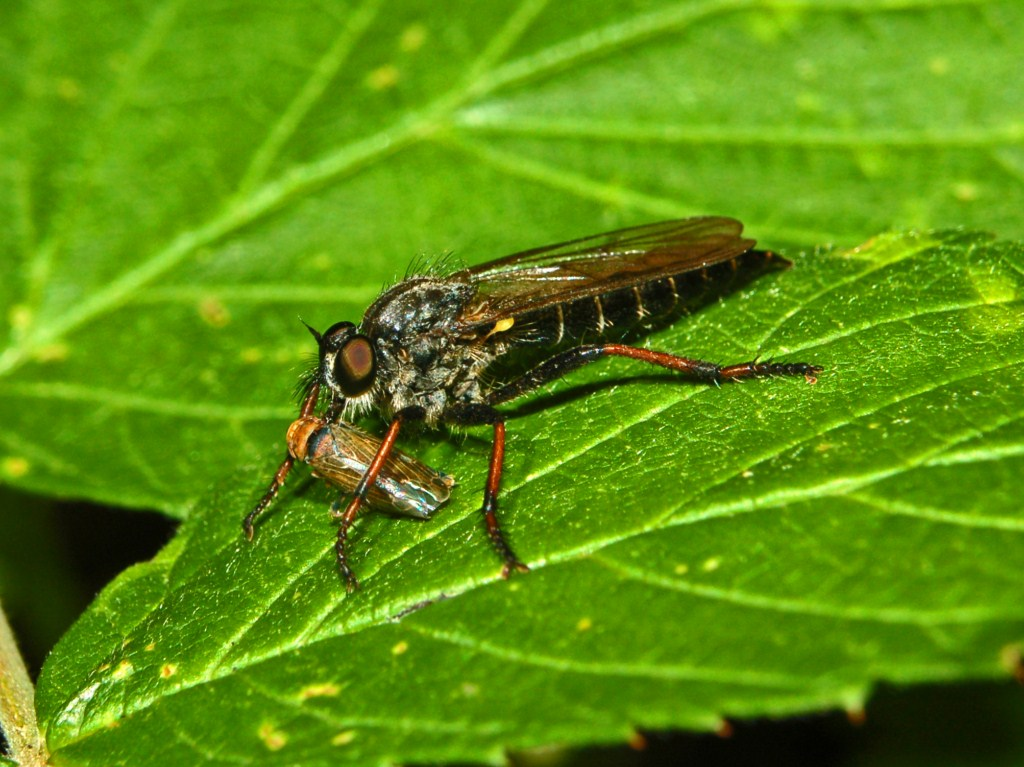
S. aemula with prey. Female
