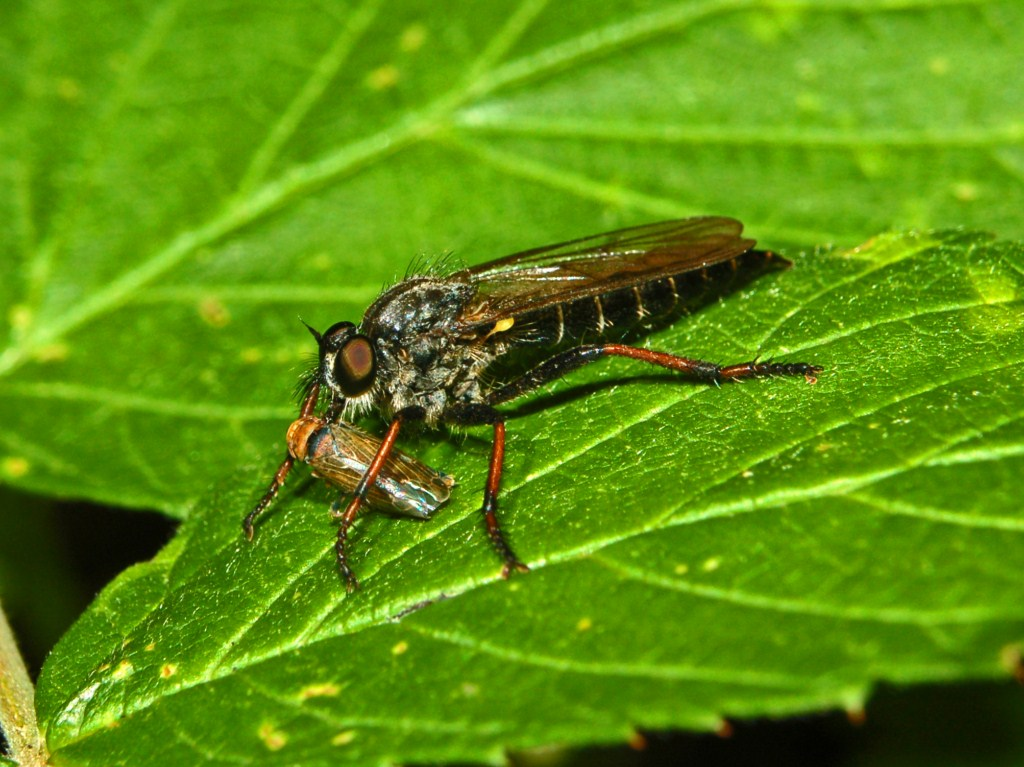
- Stilpnogaster aemula

Scientific classification
- Domain: Eukaryota
- Kingdom: Animalia
- Phylum: Arthropoda
- Class: Insecta
- Order: Diptera
- Family: Asilidae
- Subfamily: Asilinae
- Genus: Stilpnogaster; Loew, 1849

= Stilpnogaster =

Genus of flies

Stilpnogaster is a genus of flies belonging to the family Asilidae.

== Species ==
Species within this genus include:

- Stilpnogaster aemula (Meigen, 1820)
- Stilpnogaster argonautica Janssens, 1955
- Stilpnogaster setiventris (Zetterstedt, 1860)
- Stilpnogaster stabilis (Zeller, 1840)
