= Polacantha grossa =

Scientific classification
- Domain: Eukaryota
- Kingdom: Animalia
- Phylum: Arthropoda
- Class: Insecta
- Order: Diptera
- Family: Asilidae
- Genus: Polacantha
- Species: P. grossa

Binomial name
- Polacantha grossa Martin, 1975

Species of fly

Polacantha grossa is a species of robber flies in the family Asilidae.
