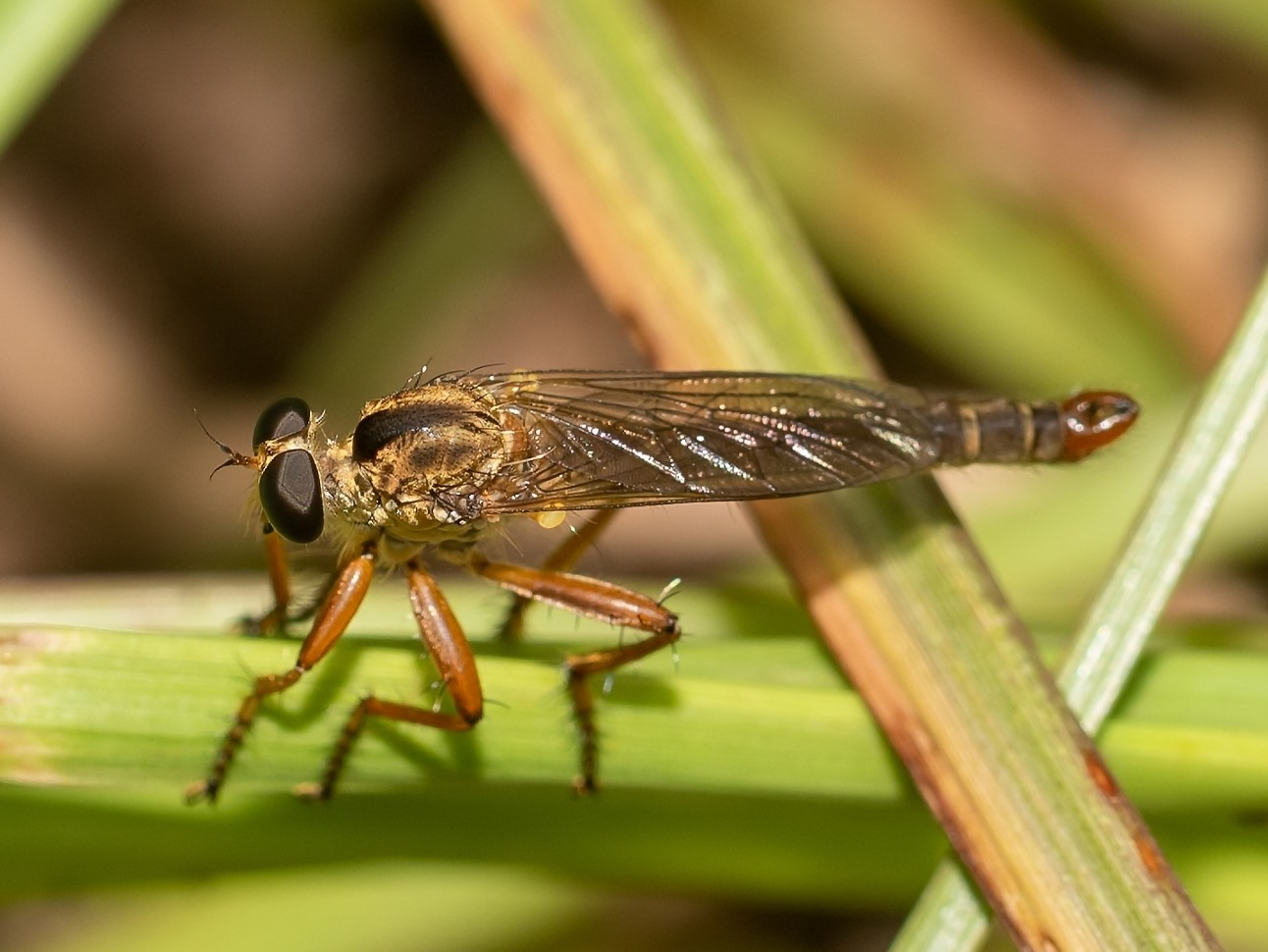
- Polacantha gracilis

Scientific classification
- Domain: Eukaryota
- Kingdom: Animalia
- Phylum: Arthropoda
- Class: Insecta
- Order: Diptera
- Family: Asilidae
- Subfamily: Asilinae
- Genus: Polacantha; Martin, 1975

= Polacantha =

Genus of flies

Polacantha is a genus of robber flies in the family Asilidae. There are about 10 described species in Polacantha.

== Species ==
These 10 species belong to the genus Polacantha:

- Polacantha arcuata Martin, 1975^{i c g b}
- Polacantha badia Martin, 1975^{c g}
- Polacantha brevis Martin, 1975^{c g}
- Polacantha composita (Hine, 1918)^{i c g b}
- Polacantha gracilis (Wiedemann, 1828)^{i c g b}
- Polacantha grossa Martin, 1975^{i c g b}
- Polacantha pegma Martin, 1975^{i c g}
- Polacantha petila Martin, 1975^{c g}
- Polacantha sinuosa Martin, 1975^{i c g}
- Polacantha tridens Martin, 1975^{c g}

Data sources: i = ITIS, c = Catalogue of Life, g = GBIF, b = Bugguide.net
