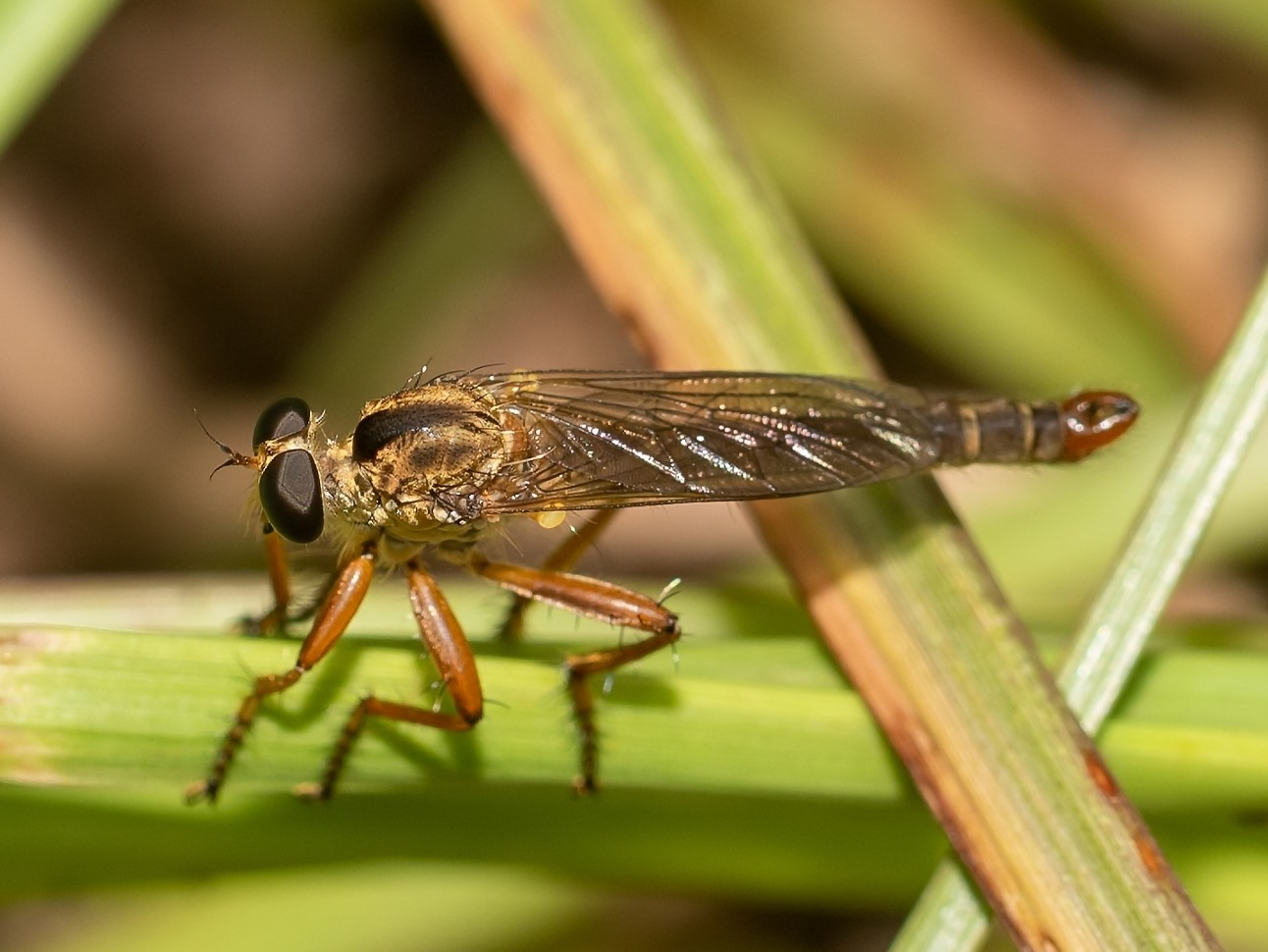

Scientific classification
- Domain: Eukaryota
- Kingdom: Animalia
- Phylum: Arthropoda
- Class: Insecta
- Order: Diptera
- Family: Asilidae
- Genus: Polacantha
- Species: P. gracilis

Binomial name
- Polacantha gracilis (Wiedemann, 1828)

Synonyms
- Asilus auratus Johnson, 1895; Asilus gracilis Wiedemann, 1828

= Polacantha gracilis =

Species of fly

Polacantha gracilis is a species of robber fly in the family Asilidae.
