= Polacantha arcuata =

Scientific classification
- Domain: Eukaryota
- Kingdom: Animalia
- Phylum: Arthropoda
- Class: Insecta
- Order: Diptera
- Family: Asilidae
- Genus: Polacantha
- Species: P. arcuata

Binomial name
- Polacantha arcuata Martin, 1975

Species of fly

Polacantha arcuata is a species of robber flies in the family Asilidae.
