= Polacantha composita =

Scientific classification
- Domain: Eukaryota
- Kingdom: Animalia
- Phylum: Arthropoda
- Class: Insecta
- Order: Diptera
- Family: Asilidae
- Genus: Polacantha
- Species: P. composita

Binomial name
- Polacantha composita (Hine, 1918)

Synonyms
- Asilus compositus Hine, 1918

Species of fly

Polacantha composita is a species of robber flies in the family Asilidae.
