= Polacantha sinuosa =

Scientific classification
- Kingdom: Animalia
- Phylum: Arthropoda
- Clade: Pancrustacea
- Class: Insecta
- Order: Diptera
- Family: Asilidae
- Genus: Polacantha
- Species: P. sinuosa

Binomial name
- Polacantha sinuosa Martin, 1975

Species of fly

Polacantha sinuosa is a species of robber fly in the family Asilidae.
