= Eccritosia zamon =

Scientific classification
- Domain: Eukaryota
- Kingdom: Animalia
- Phylum: Arthropoda
- Class: Insecta
- Order: Diptera
- Family: Asilidae
- Genus: Eccritosia
- Species: E. zamon

Binomial name
- Eccritosia zamon (Townsend, 1895)

Synonyms
- Proctacanthus zamon Townsend, 1895

Species of fly

Eccritosia zamon is a species of robber flies in the family Asilidae.
