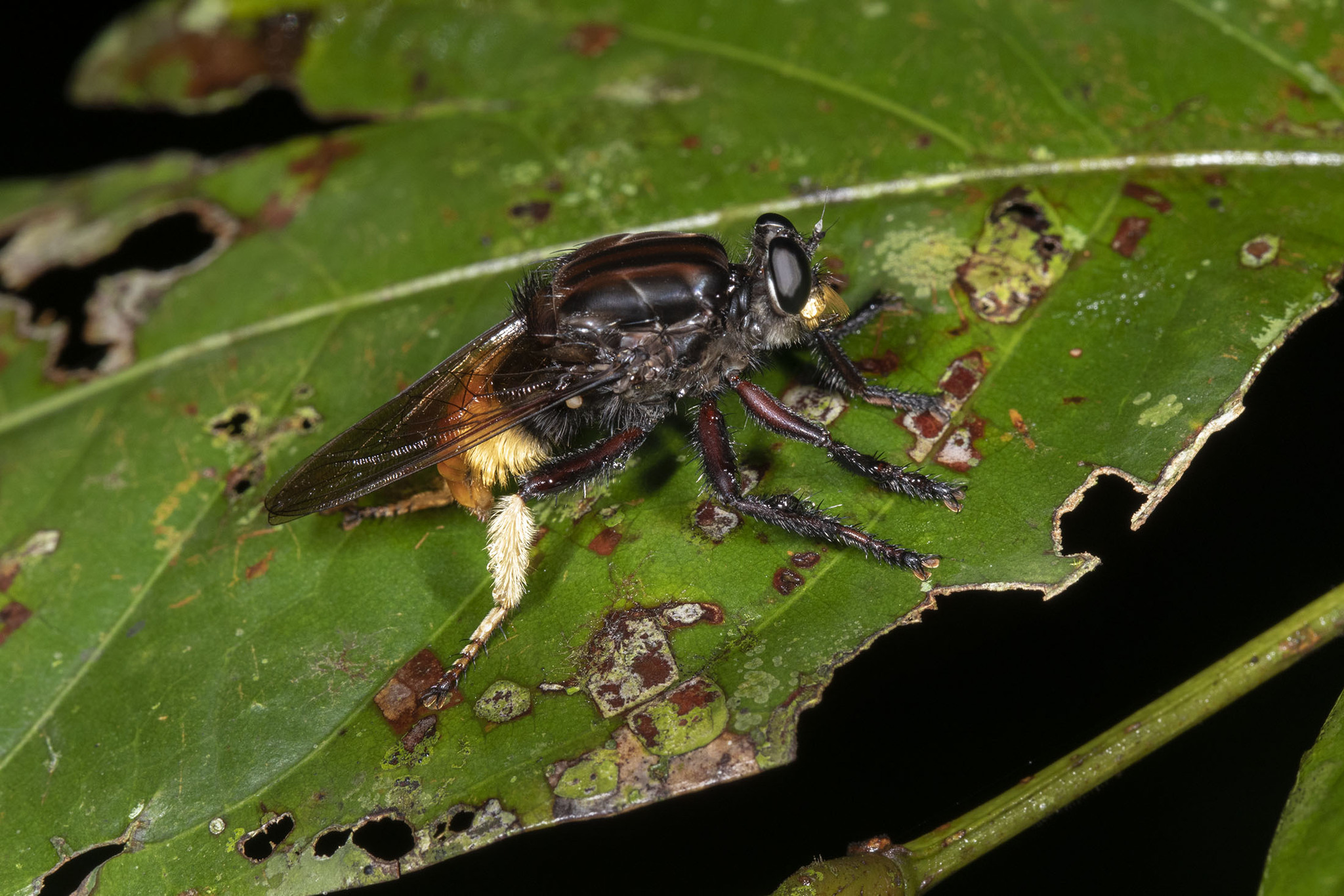
- Eccritosia barbata

Scientific classification
- Domain: Eukaryota
- Kingdom: Animalia
- Phylum: Arthropoda
- Class: Insecta
- Order: Diptera
- Family: Asilidae
- Subfamily: Asilinae
- Genus: Eccritosia; Schiner, 1866

= Eccritosia =

Genus of flies

Eccritosia is a genus of robber flies in the family Asilidae. There are about seven described species in Eccritosia.

== Species ==
These seven species belong to the genus Eccritosia:

- Eccritosia amphinome (Walker, 1849)^{c g}
- Eccritosia antidomus (Walker, 1849)^{c g}
- Eccritosia barbata (Fabricius, 1787)^{c}
- Eccritosia plinthopyga (Wiedemann, 1821)^{c g}
- Eccritosia rubriventris (Macquart, 1850)^{c g}
- Eccritosia wirthi Paramonov, 1964^{c g}
- Eccritosia zamon (Townsend, 1895)^{i c g b}

Data sources: i = ITIS, c = Catalogue of Life, g = GBIF, b = Bugguide.net
