= Proctacanthella =

Scientific classification
- Domain: Eukaryota
- Kingdom: Animalia
- Phylum: Arthropoda
- Class: Insecta
- Order: Diptera
- Family: Asilidae
- Subfamily: Asilinae
- Genus: Proctacanthella; Bromley, 1934

Genus of flies

Proctacanthella is a genus of robber flies in the family Asilidae. There are about eight described species in Proctacanthella.

== Species ==
These eight species belong to the genus Proctacanthella:

- Proctacanthella cacopiloga (Hine, 1909)^{i c g b}
- Proctacanthella exquisita (Osten Sacken, 1887)^{i c g b}
- Proctacanthella leucopogon^{g}
- Proctacanthella robusta Bromley, 1951^{i c g b}
- Proctacanthella taina Scarbrough & Perez-Gelabert, 2006^{c g}
- Proctacanthella tolandi Wilcox, 1965^{i c g}
- Proctacanthella wilcoxi Bromley, 1935^{i c g}
- Proctacanthella willistoni Fisher & Wilcox, 1987^{i g b}

Data sources: i = ITIS, c = Catalogue of Life, g = GBIF, b = Bugguide.net
