= Proctacanthella robusta =

Scientific classification
- Domain: Eukaryota
- Kingdom: Animalia
- Phylum: Arthropoda
- Class: Insecta
- Order: Diptera
- Family: Asilidae
- Genus: Proctacanthella
- Species: P. robusta

Binomial name
- Proctacanthella robusta Bromley, 1951

Species of fly

Proctacanthella robusta is a species of robber flies in the family Asilidae.
