= Proctacanthella exquisita =

Scientific classification
- Domain: Eukaryota
- Kingdom: Animalia
- Phylum: Arthropoda
- Class: Insecta
- Order: Diptera
- Family: Asilidae
- Genus: Proctacanthella
- Species: P. exquisita

Binomial name
- Proctacanthella exquisita (Osten Sacken, 1887)

Synonyms
- Proctacanthella jamesi Pritchard, 1935; Proctacanthus exquisitus Osten Sacken, 1887; Stenopogon mexicanus Cole, 1923

Species of fly

Proctacanthella exquisita is a species of robber flies in the family Asilidae.
