= Proctacanthella cacopiloga =

Scientific classification
- Domain: Eukaryota
- Kingdom: Animalia
- Phylum: Arthropoda
- Class: Insecta
- Order: Diptera
- Family: Asilidae
- Genus: Proctacanthella
- Species: P. cacopiloga

Binomial name
- Proctacanthella cacopiloga (Hine, 1909)

Synonyms
- Asilus cacopilogus Hine, 1909

Species of fly

Proctacanthella cacopiloga is a species of robber flies in the family Asilidae.
