= Proctacanthella willistoni =

Scientific classification
- Domain: Eukaryota
- Kingdom: Animalia
- Phylum: Arthropoda
- Class: Insecta
- Order: Diptera
- Family: Asilidae
- Genus: Proctacanthella
- Species: P. willistoni

Binomial name
- Proctacanthella willistoni Fisher & Wilcox, 1987

Synonyms
- Asilus leucopogon Williston, 1893

Species of robber flies

Proctacanthella willistoni is a species of robber flies in the family Asilidae.
