= Myelaphus =

Scientific classification
- Domain: Eukaryota
- Kingdom: Animalia
- Phylum: Arthropoda
- Class: Insecta
- Order: Diptera
- Family: Asilidae
- Subfamily: Stenopogoninae
- Genus: Myelaphus; Bigot, 1882

Genus of flies

Myelaphus is a genus of robber flies in the family Asilidae. There are about six described species in Myelaphus.

== Species ==
These six species belong to the genus Myelaphus:

- Myelaphus bokhai Lehr, 1999^{c g}
- Myelaphus dispar (Loew, 1873)^{c g}
- Myelaphus jozanus Matsumura, 1916^{c g}
- Myelaphus lobicornis (Osten Sacken, 1877)^{i c g}
- Myelaphus melas Bigot, 1882^{i c g b}
- Myelaphus ussuriensis Lehr, 1999^{c g}

Data sources: i = ITIS, c = Catalogue of Life, g = GBIF, b = Bugguide.net
