= Myelaphus melas =

Scientific classification
- Domain: Eukaryota
- Kingdom: Animalia
- Phylum: Arthropoda
- Class: Insecta
- Order: Diptera
- Family: Asilidae
- Genus: Myelaphus
- Species: M. melas

Binomial name
- Myelaphus melas Bigot, 1882

Synonyms
- Myelaphus rufus Williston, 1883

Species of fly

Myelaphus melas is a species of robber flies in the family Asilidae.
