= Negasilus astutus =

Scientific classification
- Domain: Eukaryota
- Kingdom: Animalia
- Phylum: Arthropoda
- Class: Insecta
- Order: Diptera
- Family: Asilidae
- Genus: Negasilus
- Species: N. astutus

Binomial name
- Negasilus astutus (Williston, 1893)

Synonyms
- Asilus astutus Williston, 1893

Species of fly

Negasilus astutus is a species of robber flies in the family Asilidae.
