= Negasilus =

Scientific classification
- Domain: Eukaryota
- Kingdom: Animalia
- Phylum: Arthropoda
- Class: Insecta
- Order: Diptera
- Family: Asilidae
- Subfamily: Asilinae
- Genus: Negasilus; Curran, 1934

Genus of flies

Negasilus is a genus of robber flies in the family Asilidae. There are about five described species in Negasilus.

== Species ==
These five species belong to the genus Negasilus:

- Negasilus astutus (Williston, 1893)^{i c g b}
- Negasilus belli Curran, 1934^{i c g}
- Negasilus cumbipilosus Adisoemarto, 1967^{g}
- Negasilus gramalis (Adisoemarto, 1967)^{i c g}
- Negasilus platyceras (Hine, 1922)^{i c g}

Data sources: i = ITIS, c = Catalogue of Life, g = GBIF, b = Bugguide.net
